= Type 100 =

Type 100 can refer to:

== Weaponry ==
- Type 100 tank, a new Chinese 4th generation medium tank which debuted at the 2025 China Victory Day Parade.
- Type 100 support vehicle, a new Chinese fire support vehicle that debuted at the 2025 China Victory Day Parade.
- Mitsubishi Ki-21, medium bomber, some 100 converted to Army Type 100 Transport Model 1
- Mitsubishi Ki-46, also known as the Army Type 100 Command Reconnaissance Aircraft
- Mitsubishi Ki-57, also known as the Army Type 100 Transport Model 1
- Mitsubishi Type 100 air-cooled diesel V-12 engine used in a number of Japanese tanks including the Type 1 Chi-He
- Mitsubishi Type 100 air-cooled six-cylinder diesel engine used in the Type 98 Ke-Ni light tank
- Nakajima Ki-49, a medium bomber also known as the Army Type 100 Heavy Bomber Model 1
- Type 100 incendiary bomb, a 50 kg bomb, one of many Japanese World War II army bombs
- Type 100 smoke bomb, a 50 kg bomb, one of many Japanese World War II army bombs
- Type 100 submachine gun, Japanese weapon
- Type 100 rifle, one of three TERA rifles used by paratroopers
- Type 100 machine gun, Japanese weapon
- Type 100 flamethrower, Japanese weapon
- Type 100 armor-piercing tracer round, fired by the Type 98 20 mm AA Machine Cannon
- Type 100 high-explosive tracer round, fired by the Type 98 20 mm AA Machine Cannon
- Type 100 37 mm gun used on the Type 98 Ke-Ni light tank

== Technology ==
- Type 100 tram as used in Adelaide, Australia, also known as Bombardier Flexity Classic
- Type 100 pack film, an instant film used in Land cameras

== Fictional ==
- Type 100, a fictional weapon from the Mobile Suit Zeta Gundam series, Hyaku Shiki
- Yuria Type 100, a sex robot, the main character of the manga series Yuria 100 Shiki
