= Type 69 tank =

Type 69
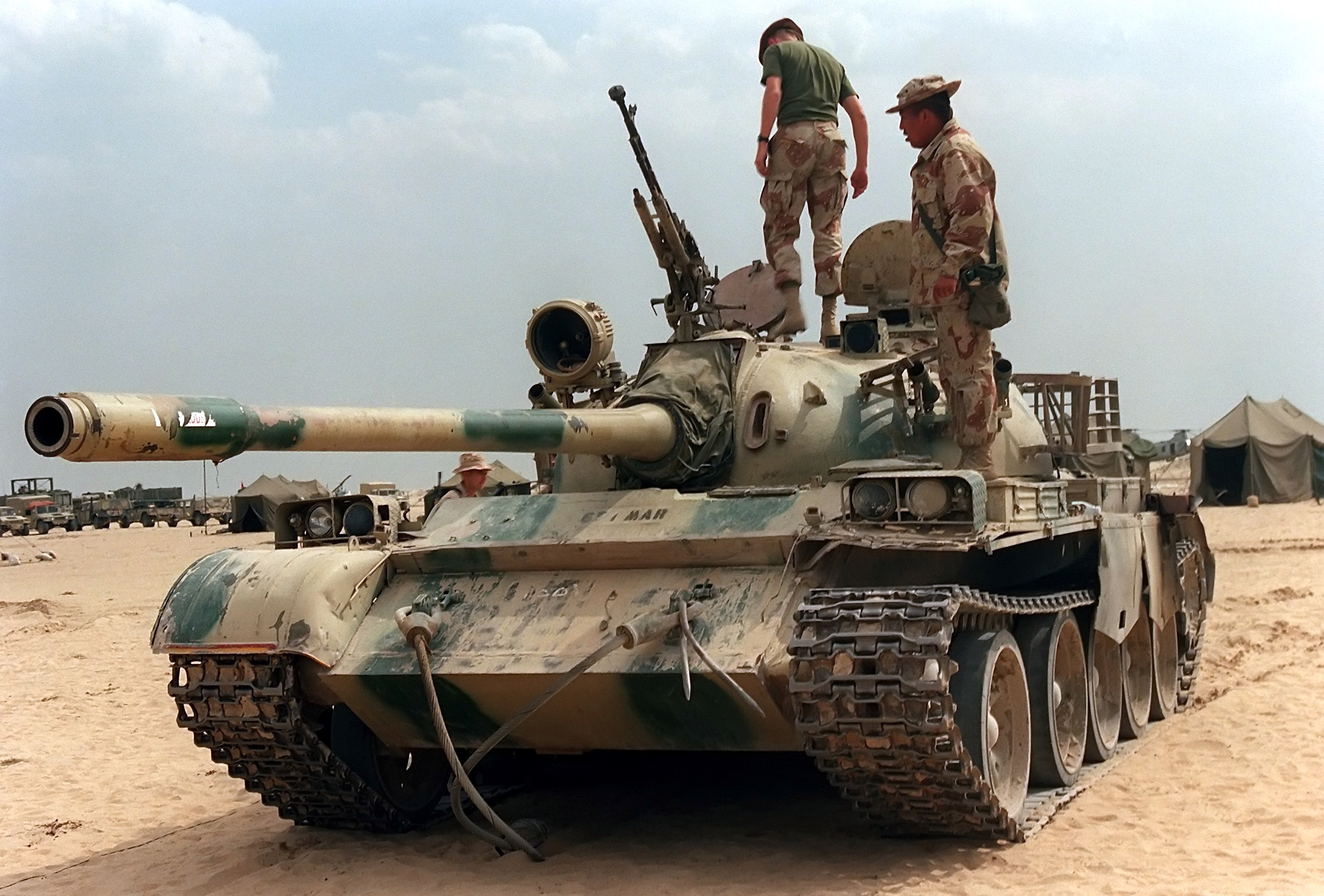
- Iraqi Type 69-II captured during the Gulf War.
- Type: Main battle tank
- Place of origin: China

Service history
- In service: 1972–present (Type 69); 1982–present (Type 69-II); 1984–present (Type 79)
- Used by: See Operators
- Wars: Iran–Iraq War; Gulf War; Iraq War; Syrian civil war War in Iraq (2013–2017)

Production history
- Designer: No. 60 Research Institute
- Designed: 1963–1972
- Manufacturer: First Inner Mongolia Machinery Factory (Inner Mongolia First Machinery Group Corporation)

Specifications
- Mass: 36.7 tonnes
- Length: 6.24 m (Hull)
- Width: 3.3 m
- Height: 2.80 m
- Crew: 4
- Armor: 203 mm
- Main armament: 100mm smoothbore/105 mm rifled tank gun
- Secondary armament: 7.62 mm coaxial and bow machine guns, 12.7 mm antiaircraft machine gun
- Engine: 12150L-7 V-12 diesel engine 580 hp (430 kW)
- Power/weight: 15.8 hp/tonne
- Suspension: torsion-bar
- Operational range: 440 km
- Maximum speed: 50 km/h

The Type 69 (Chinese: 69式; pinyin: Liùjiǔ shì) and Type 79 (Chinese: 79式; pinyin: Qījiǔ shì) are Chinese first generation main battle tanks. Both were developments of the Type 59 medium tank (a locally produced Soviet T-54A) with technologies derived from the T-62. They were the first indigenously developed main battle tanks by China, although also classified as medium tanks while in development and service. Their lineage from the T-54A can be seen through the distinct gap between the first and second road wheels. Other improvements included a new engine, ballistic computers, and laser rangefinders. The more advanced Type 79 variant was equipped with a 105 mm rifled gun which was also found on the Type 80 tank.

== History ==
=== Development of the Type 69 ===
After the Sino-Soviet split, the Soviet Union withdrew its technical staff and support to China's arms industry. This caused China's domestic tank development to stagnate significantly. Sometime after 1960, the PLA tank corps and Fifth Ministry of Machine Building embarked on the development of China's first domestically developed tank. In 1965, development objectives were finalized and the product was named "WZ121" internally. In 1966, the first prototype rolled off the factory. However, the Cultural Revolution and its resulting chaos further impeded tank development.

During the 1969 Sino-Soviet border conflict, the PLA was able to capture a Soviet T-62 MBT. The captured tank was examined and some of its components such as the Soviet Luna IR (infrared) searchlight system, were copied and integrated into the Type 69 prototype. After around a decade of development, the first domestically developed and produced Chinese tank was inducted into the PLA ground forces as the Type 1969 Medium Tank or Type 69 Tank for short.

The Type 69's appearance did not differ much from that of the Type 59. The fume extractor on the 100mm gun was moved back slightly and there was a large IR light attached to the turret. There was a laser rangefinder on the gun mantlet and a smaller IR light on the commander's hatch, making it the first Chinese tank capable of fighting in the dark. The main upgrade in the Type 69 was in its firepower. The Type 69 was the first Chinese tank to be outfitted with a 100mm smoothbore gun capable of firing APFSDS rounds. It also had two-plane gun stabilization. With these upgrades the Type 69 was a much more battle-capable MBT than the Type 59, especially at night. It was also faster thanks to an upgraded engine. The Type 69's protection, however, was essentially the same as the Type 59. Like the Type 59, it also did not have any NBC protection.

The Type 69 was incorporated into service in 1974. As it was fundamentally an improved variant of the Type 59, however, the Chinese military decided to develop another second-generation main battle tank based on new technologies. The new tank program, also known as the Type 80, began development in 1978, built upon the foundation that was laid during the development of the Type 69 tank.

==== Deployment and teething problems ====
Despite these improvements, due to the large number of technical problems when operating the tanks, the initial batch of Type 69 tanks were returned to the factory. By March 1974, only 100 Type 69 tanks had been produced. The relevant departments in tank development did not have sufficient experience or knowledge, and the overly ambitious design requirements meant that a large amount of time was wasted. Compounding to this immaturity in the tank manufacturing industry was the on-going Cultural Revolution. The Type 69 took almost a decade of development but resulted in a tank that looked only marginally different from the original Type 59 and was only significantly different in its firepower. By the time the Type 69 went into production, other countries had already developed much more advanced tanks such as the American M60 MBTs or what would eventually become the Russian T-72.

==== Development of the Type 79 ====
Relations between China and the West warmed in the 1980s, and China was able to import some Western technologies to improve its weapon systems. The Type 69 was upgraded with Western systems such as the British Marconi FCS, and the L7 105 mm gun. The new version received the designation Type 79, which represented the conclusion of China's first-generation tank development.

Both the Type 69 and Type 79 tanks share almost identical hulls and turrets with the older Type 59. The only difference is that the two more recent tank models have been upgraded with better technologies that were either captured or bought from more advanced countries. (Gelbart 1996:17-19) The Chinese Type 59, 69 and 79 tanks can therefore be viewed as part of the same, evolutionary tank family in the same way that the Soviet T-54, T-55 and T-62 tanks share a common lineage.

Today only a couple of hundred Type 69/Type 79s remain in PLA inventory, mostly deployed with training or reserve units. The Type 69/Type 79 are being replaced by the newer Type 96 and Type 99 MBTs.

=== Foreign service ===
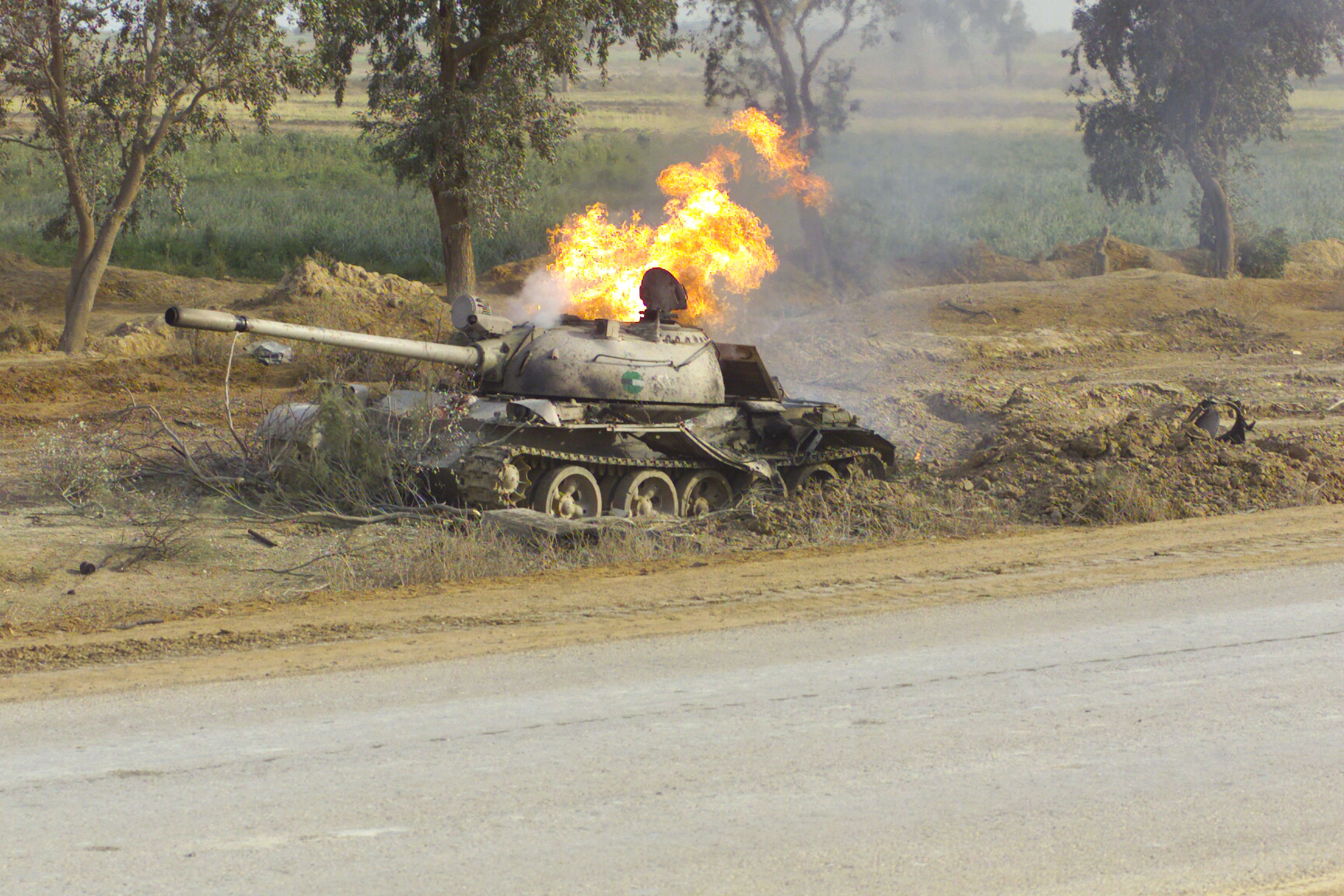
Type 69 Main Battle Tank (MBT) north of the An Nu'maniyah Bridge on Highway 27 destroyed during the US Invasion of Iraq in April 2003.

The PLA was dissatisfied with the Type 69's performance, but it still became one of China's most successful armored vehicle exports. These export versions were called Type 69-II (in contrast to the domestic Type 69-I) and had incorporated improvements which were not found in the original Type 69-I. Over 2,000 were sold worldwide in the 1980s. The simplicity, robustness and low cost of the tanks made them attractive on the export market, and China sold hundreds to both sides during the Iran–Iraq War. (Gelbart 1996:18) Many of the vehicles were later used by Saddam Hussein during the Gulf War and the 2003 Iraq War.

During the 1980s, China sold hundreds of Type 69 MBTs to Iraq. By the Persian Gulf War of 1990 and 1991, western analysts claim that Iraq had upgraded some Type 69s with a 105 mm gun, a 60 mm mortar, and a 125 mm gun with an auto-loader. All of them were reinforced with frontal layer armor welded on the glacis plate. All these versions were known as Type 69-QMs. It was reported during the 1991 Gulf War that the Iraqi Type 69 units fought harder than the elite Republican Guard units, equipped with T-72 MBTs. One possible explanation is that Saddam ordered his Republican Guard units to preserve their strength, while sending the rest of the army, equipped with inferior Type 69 tanks, to the frontline.

According to battle reports from the 2003 invasion of Iraq, Type 69-QMs were used by the Iraqi Army units defending Nasiriyah in March 2003, most of them being employed as artillery pillboxes. They played an important role in the ambushes mounted against the US Army 507th Maintenance Company and Charlie Company of the 1st Battalion, 2nd Marines, before AH-1 Cobra helicopters wiped out the Iraqi tanks. Two Type 69s destroyed at least four vehicles of the 507th, among them a heavy truck rammed by one of the tanks. There is also a first hand account of about four Type 69s hidden behind some buildings pounding the Marines' Charlie Company with indirect fire and likely disabling several AAVs. Some combat useless Type 59/69s were emplaced as decoys or mere obstacles.

Myanmar Army Type 69 tanks also reportedly engaged Royal Thai Army M60A3 tanks in 2001 during the battle for Border Post 9631, although it is unclear if either side lost any vehicles.

== Variants ==
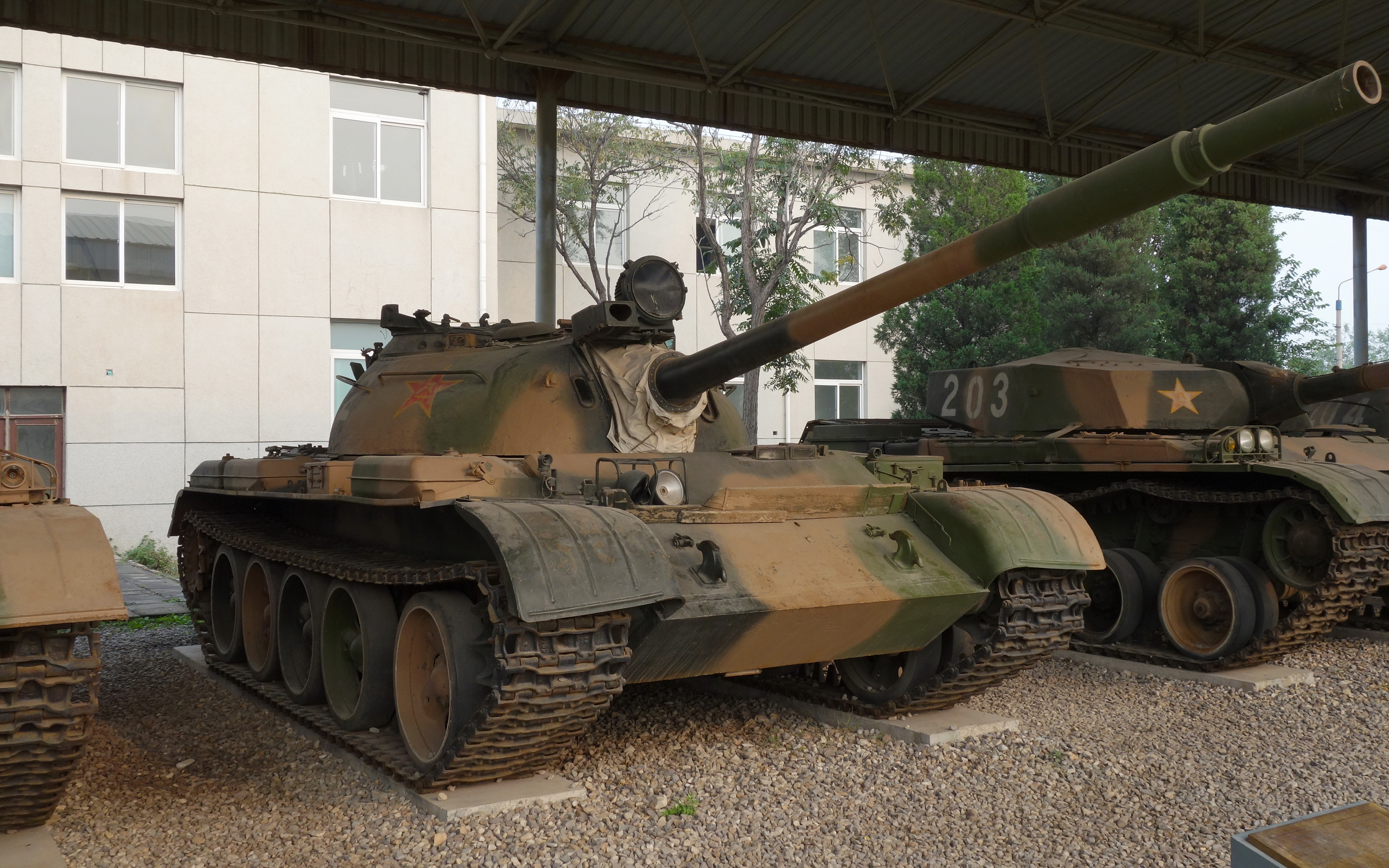
Type 69.

=== Prototypes ===
- Type 69 – Prototype based on the Type 59 hull, fitted with a new 580 hp diesel engine, Type 69 100 mm smoothbore gun, IR searchlight, and laser rangefinder.
- Type 69-I – Domestic variant incorporating some technologies from captured Soviet T-62 MBT, such as the Luna IR searchlight system, and improved NBC protection. The -I designation (such as Type 59-I, Type 69-I) denotes a domestic variant. A -2 designation denotes an variant designed for export. Similarly a "M" suffix also denoted a foreign export variant.

=== Production variants ===
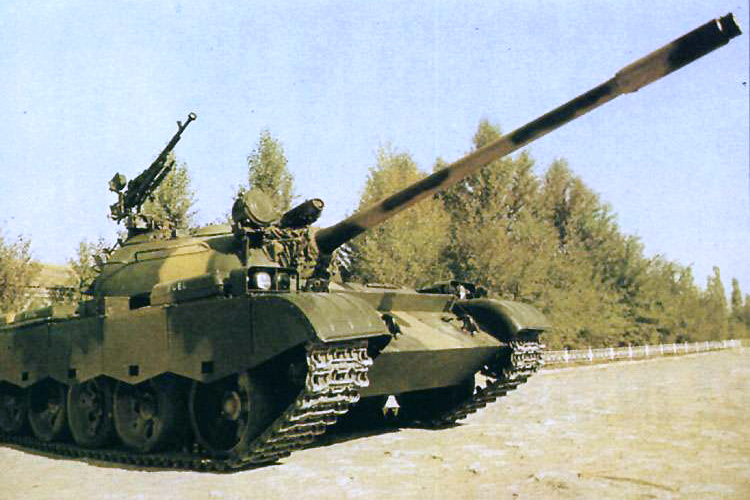
Type 69-II

==== Type 69 ====
- Type 69-IIA – First production version released in 1982, fitted with:
  - Type 69-II 100 mm rifled gun instead of the type 69 smoothbore cannon found on the Type 69, which had proven inferior in performance
  - New FCS system with:
    - TSFC 2-axis gun stabilization
    - Type 70 gunner sight
    - TCRLA Laser rangefinder
    - BCLA Ballistic computer
  - Type 889 radio
  - Armored track skirts
  - Storage racks on turret
  - Smoke grenade launchers
  - 2 diamond shaped oil cap on angled plate behind engine deck

This version was widely exported and produced under license in Pakistan by Heavy Industries Taxila (HIT). The Type 69-II is referred to as the Type 30 in the Royal Thai Army.

- Type 69-IIB/C – Command version of the Type 69-II with additional communications equipment and auxiliary power pack. Features a long radio aerial and two storage boxes on the rear, containing cables and field phone.
- Type 653 ARV – Armored recovery vehicle based on the chassis of Type 69 MBT. The Type 653 ARV is fielded with no turret but instead features a powered structure controlling a dozer blade at the front of the hull and a hydraulically powered crane. The crane is capable of lifting up to 70 tons.

==== Type 79 ====
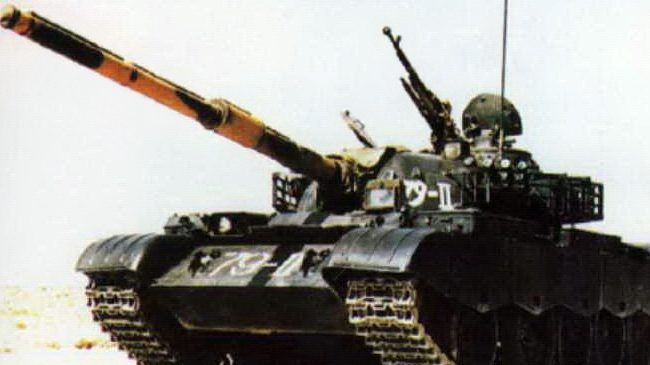
Chinese Type 79 (Type 69-III, WZ-121D).

- Type 79 (Type 69-III) – Also designated WZ-121D, an improved Type 69-II incorporating Western technologies. In service with the PLA as the Type 79 MBT. In 1981, the first prototype was modified as per specification as Type 69-III. Two formal prototypes were built in 1983, equipped with key components such as a laser rangefinder. The Type 79 entered production in 1984, and was shown in public at the PRC's 35th anniversary parade in 1984. Improvements include:
  - Rubber-padded tracks
  - NBC protection. Hatches that automatically close on detection of NBC agents
  - ZPL-83 (Type 83) 105 mm gun (improved L7 variant) with replaceable indigenous thermal sleeve (Type 79-II).
  - Passive IR sights or thermal imaging system for gunner and commander
  - British Marconi FCS with:
    - TLRLA laser rangefinder
    - BCLA ballistic computer
    - TGSA gunner sight
  - Type 12150L-7BW liquid-cooled 730 hp Diesel engine.
  - Hydraulic assist steering
  - Automatic fire suppression system
  - Side-skirt armor
- Type 79-II
  - Fitted with improved ZPL-83A (Type 83A) 105 mm gun.
  - Can be fitted with Explosive Reactive Armor (ERA)
- GCZ-110: armored engineering vehicle

=== Foreign variants ===
==== Iraq ====
Iraqi Type 69 tank in Baghdad in 2013

- Type 69-QM – Also known as T-55B inside the Iraqi Army. Type 69-II with standard 100 mm rifled main gun, armour reinforced with layer armour on the front glacis, an observation mast and, on some units, a 60 mm mortar. Command vehicles often fitted with blocks of appliqué spaced armour, similar to the so-called Enigma T-55s. Produced 1986–1988.
- Type 69-QM1 – Type 69-II upgraded with NATO standard 105 mm rifled gun and laser range-finder. Produced in 1984–1988.
- Type 69-QM2 – Type 69-II upgraded with Warsaw Pact standard 125 mm (L80) smoothbore main gun and laser range-finder. Produced 1986–1991.

==== Bangladesh ====
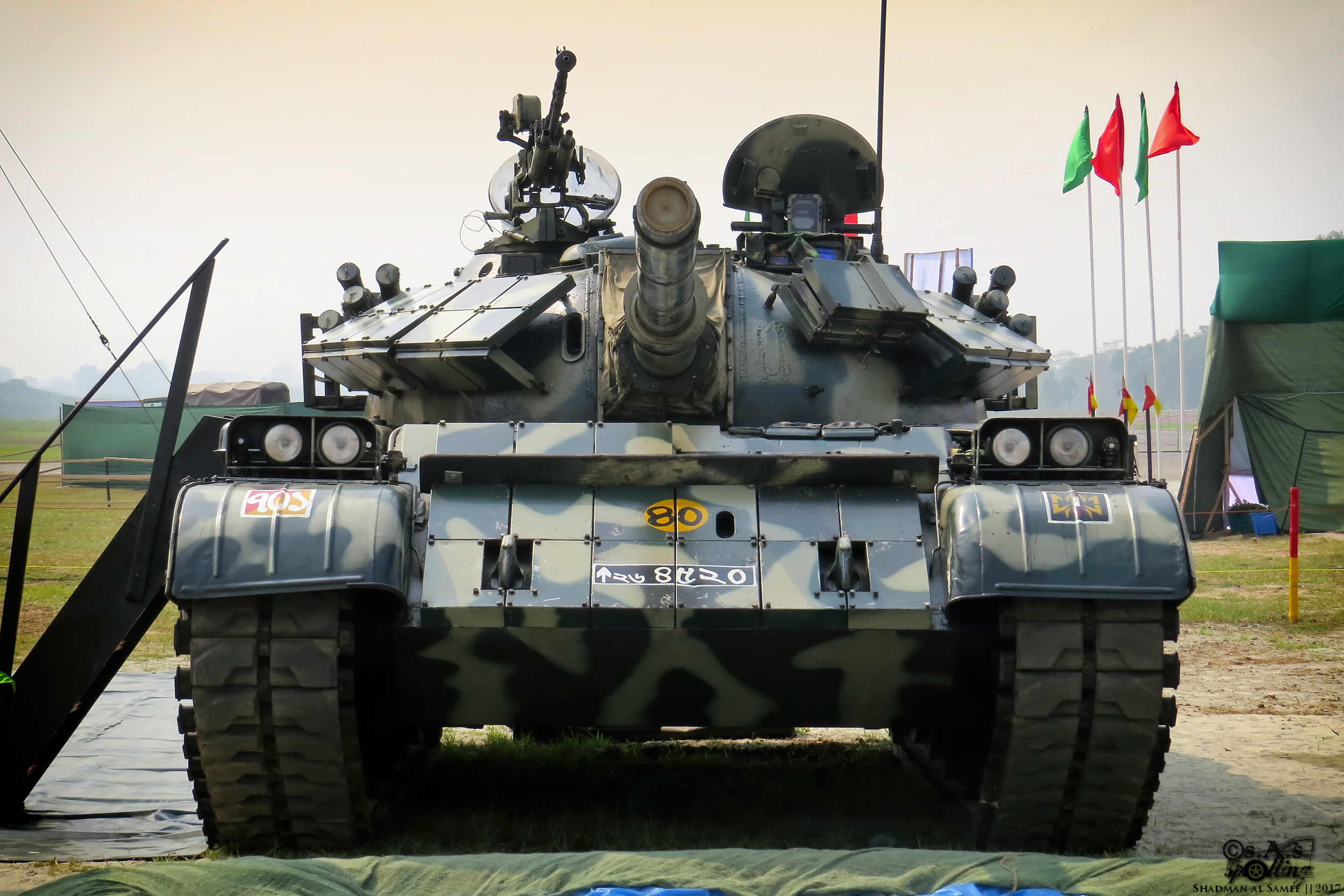
Bangladesh Army T-69IIG MBT with reactive armour.

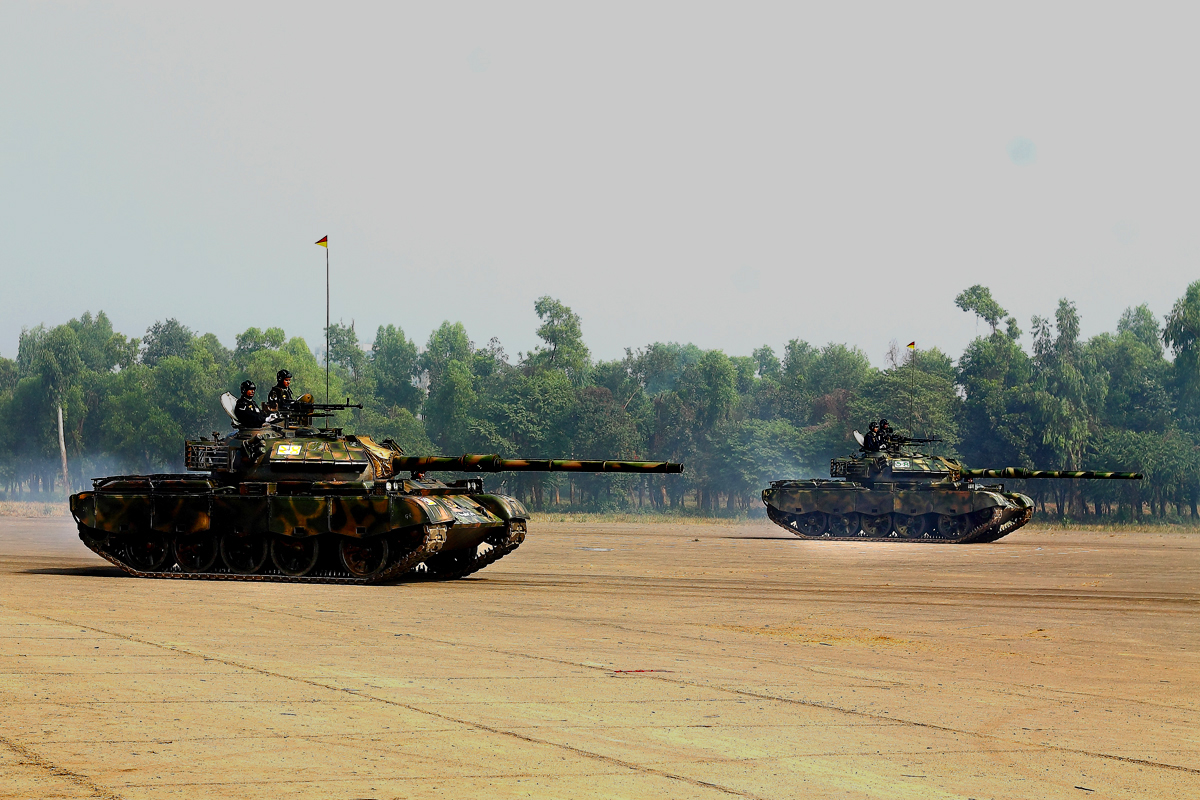
T-69IIG MBT of Bangladesh Army

Bangladesh Army Engineers improved its weaponry and armor system to make it more effective.

- T-69IIG – An upgraded Bangladeshi model with the following modifications:
  - Bi-axis stabilised Type-83A (improved L-7 with bigger bore and longer barrel) 105mm rifled gun (NATO compatible), with semi-automatic loader.
  - New fire control system (FCS), laser range-finder, Night vision sights & combat data link
  - 850 hp (630 kW) diesel engine
  - Chinese 3rd generation explosive reactive armour (ERA) protection, automatic collective fire suppression system, Laser warning receiver, NBC suite.
  - New communications and navigation equipment (including GPS receiver)
  - Rubber padded track

==== Myanmar ====
- Myanmar Army have Type-69 MBT 50 and Type-69-2 MBT 80. All were upgraded locally with Ukrainian equipment in 2019 May into Type-69II(Mod) standard.

=== Non-military applications ===
A civilian variant of the Type 69/79 was used to develop the Chinese firefighting tank. Currently only three fire brigades in China have purchased such a vehicle.

== Operators ==
=== Current ===
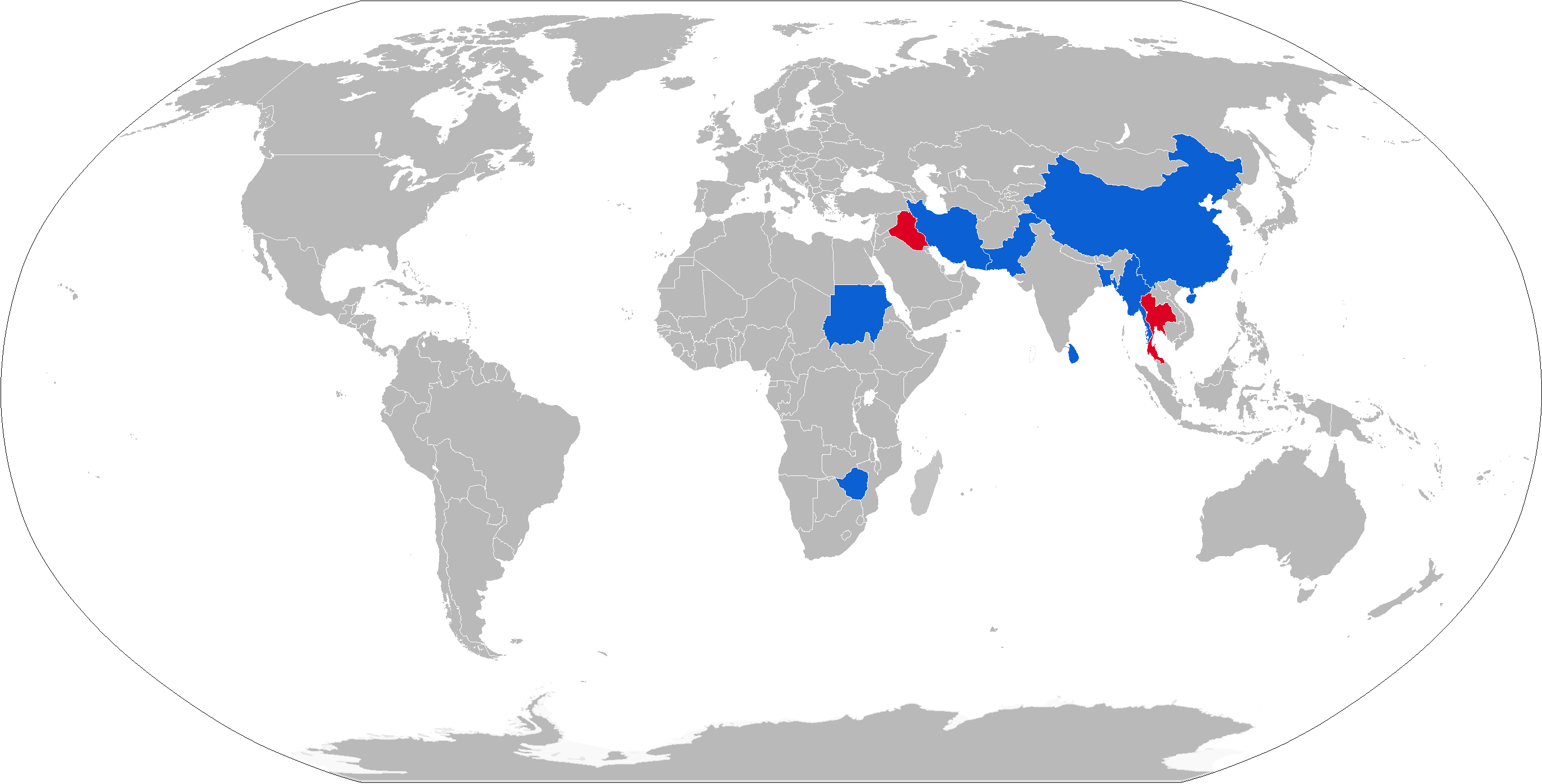
Operators Current Former

- Bangladesh − 58 Type 69 and Type 69G as of 2024.
- Kurdistan − Used by the Peshmerga.
- Pakistan − 400 as of 2024.
- Myanmar − 100 Type 69-II as of 2024.
- Zimbabwe − 10 as of 2024, serviceability doubtful.
- Sri Lanka - Unknown numbers in service.

=== Former ===
- Iran − Estimated to have 200 in 2011.
- Iraq − Approximately 1,500 Type 69-I and Type 69-II tanks received between 1983 and 1988 from China.
- Thailand − 50 in storage as of 2024.

=== Non-State Actors ===
- People's Mojahedin Organization of Iran
- Islamic State

== See also ==
- Type 59/62
- Type 80/85/88
- Type 96
- Type 90/MBT-2000
- Type 99
- T-54/55
- T-62
