= Type 59 tank =

Chinese main battle tank

Type 59
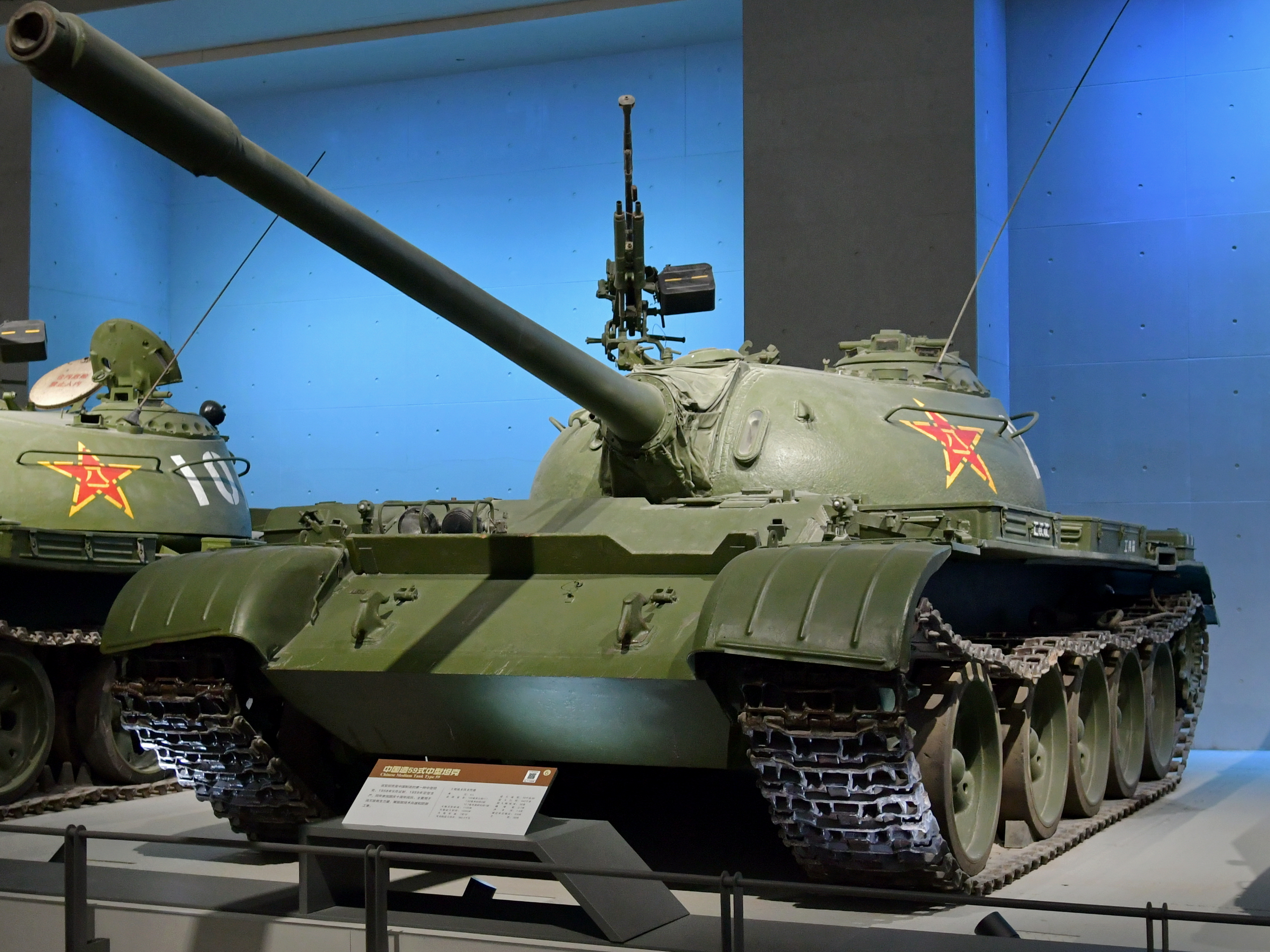
- A Type 59 tank in Military Museum of the Chinese People's Revolution
- Type: Main battle tank
- Place of origin: China

Service history
- In service: 1959–present
- Wars: Vietnam War; Cambodian Civil War; Laotian Civil War; Sino-Indian War; Indo-Pakistani War of 1971; Sino-Vietnamese War; Iran–Iraq War; Second Sudanese Civil War; Sri Lankan Civil War; Gulf War; First Congo War; Kosovo War; Albania–Yugoslav border incident (April 1999); Sudanese civil war (2023–present)

Production history
- Manufacturer: First Inner Mongolia Machinery Factory, Norinco
- Produced: 1958–1985
- No. built: 9,500

Specifications
- Mass: 36 tonnes (35 long tons; 40 short tons)
- Length: 6.04 metres (19.8 ft) (hull)
- Width: 3.27 metres (10.7 ft)
- Height: 2.59 metres (8 ft 6 in)
- Crew: 4
- Armor: 20–203 mm
- Main armament: 100 mm rifled gun
- Secondary armament: 2 x Type 59T 7.62 mm machine gun, Type 54 12.7 mm air-defence machine gun
- Engine: Model 12150L V-12 liquid-cooled diesel 520 hp (390 kW)
- Power/weight: 14.44 hp/tonne
- Suspension: torsion bar
- Operational range: 450 km, 600 km with external tanks
- Maximum speed: 50 kilometres per hour (31 mph)

The Type 59 (Chinese: 59式; pinyin: Wǔ jiǔ shì; industrial designation: WZ-120) is a Chinese version of the Soviet T-54A main battle tank, an early model of the ubiquitous T-54/55 series. The first vehicles were produced in 1958 and were accepted into service in 1959, with serial production beginning in 1963. Over 9,500 of the tanks were produced by the time production ended in 1985 with approximately 5,500 serving with the Chinese armed forces. The tank formed the backbone of the People's Liberation Army's armoured units until the early 2000s, with an estimated 5,000 of the later Type 59-I and Type 59-II variants in service in 2002.

The Type 59 was modified several times during its service. It was also the basis of several later Chinese tank designs including the Type 69 and Type 79 tanks.

== Description ==
The Type 59 is almost identical to the early production Soviet T-54As, but there are some key differences. The Type 59 was not originally fitted with the infrared searchlight or main gun stabilization of the T-54.

The Type 59 has a conventional post-war layout with an engine compartment at the rear and a cast dome-shaped gun turret in the centre of the hull. The hull is welded steel varying in thickness between 99 mm on the front lower glacis to 20 mm on the hull floor. The turret varies in thickness from 39–100 mm.

The driver sits in the front left of the hull, and is provided with a hatch immediately above his seat, which opens to the left. The driver has two pop-up vision blocks which give coverage ahead and slightly to the right when buttoned up. The commander sits in the turret along with the gunner and loader. The commander's hatch is on the turret left, with the gunner sitting forward and below him. The loader sits on the right of the turret and has a hatch above him. The turret has a non-rotating floor, which complicated the crew's operations as they would not rotate with the turret.

The turret mounts a rifled 100 mm Type 59 cannon, for which 34 rounds are typically carried. A Type 59T 7.62 mm machine gun is mounted coaxially with the main gun. A Type 54 12.7 mm anti-aircraft machine gun (the Chinese copy of the Russian 12.7 mm M1938/46 DShKM heavy machine gun) is provided above the gunner's hatch for which 200 rounds are carried. 3,500 rounds of 7.62 mm ammunition are normally carried.

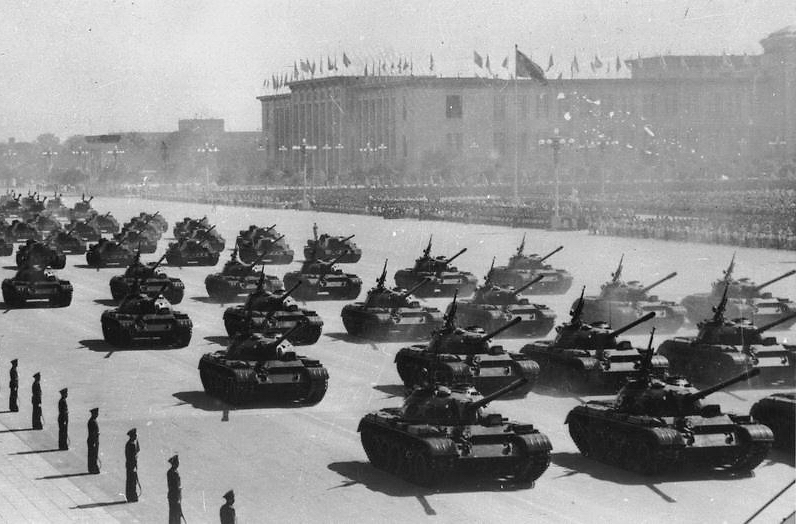
Type 59 tanks participating in the PRC's 10th National Day parade in 1959

The turret has a powered traverse mechanism that is probably comparable to the T-54 traverse mechanism which can rotate the turret through 360 degrees in 21 seconds. Very early models of the Type 59 gun had manual elevation gear, later replaced with a powered system which allowed the gun to be aimed at between +17 and −4 degrees (the average depression for Western tanks is -10, which allows for better usage of hull-down tactics). Later models added vertical stabilization to make firing on the move practical. An infrared searchlight-based night vision system was retrofitted to the tank with an infrared periscope for the commander gunner and driver.

The tank is powered by a Model 12150L V-12 liquid-cooled diesel engine, which develops 390 kilowatts (520 hp) at 2,000 rpm. The engine feeds a manual gearbox with five forward and one reverse gear. A total of 815 litres of diesel can be carried internally in the tank, with a further 400 litres carried externally giving a maximum road range of 600 kilometers, or approximately 430 km using only internal fuel. The tank has five road wheels on each side with a prominent gap between the first and second road wheel. The track is driven by a drive sprocket at the rear, with an idler at the front. It is notable that there are no return rollers. The suspension is a torsion bar system. Engine exhaust is on the left fender.

Ammunition is stored inside the turret, which increases the odds of a catastrophic secondary explosion should the tank's interior be penetrated by enemy fire. Crew survivability is hence low.

== History ==
After the signing of the Sino-Soviet Treaty of Friendship, Alliance, and Mutual Assistance, the Soviets agreed to assist China in building a tank manufacturing facility to manufacture the T-54A in 1956. Initially, the tanks were assembled with Soviet-supplied parts, which were gradually replaced by Chinese-made components. The tank was accepted into service by the PLA in 1959, and given the designation Type 59. It became the first domestic Chinese tank to reach serial production.

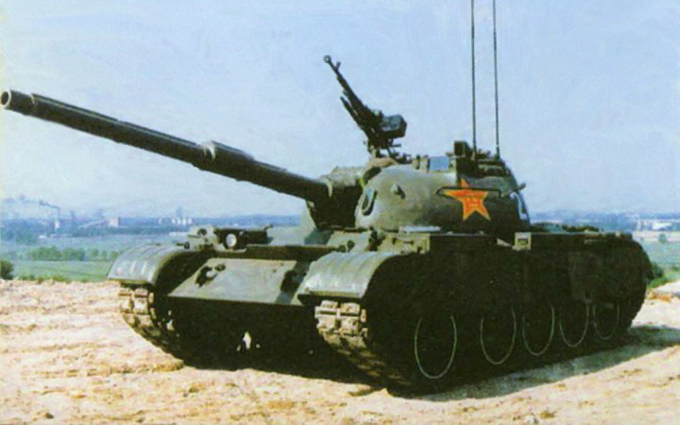
Type 59-IIA tank

Over the years, the Type 59 design was enhanced with various domestically developed and western technologies; when the PLA captured a Soviet T-62 during the Sino-Soviet border conflict in 1969, improvements based on the T-62 were incorporated into the Type 59 design to become the Type 69 MBT. The Type 69 was further upgraded with Western technology and became the Type 79 MBT. The Type 59 was, therefore, the first in China's first generation of main battle tanks, the Type 79 being the last. The Type 79 was superseded by the Type 80 second-generation MBT.

The Type 59 MBT is also known as WZ-120 by its manufacturer. Over 10,000 were produced between 1959 and the mid-1980s. The Type 59 and its successor, the Type 69, were widely exported, with thousands sold overseas. Today an estimated 5,000 Type 59 MBTs remain in PLA inventory, but it's being supplanted by the more capable Type 96 and Type 99 MBTs.

== Combat service ==
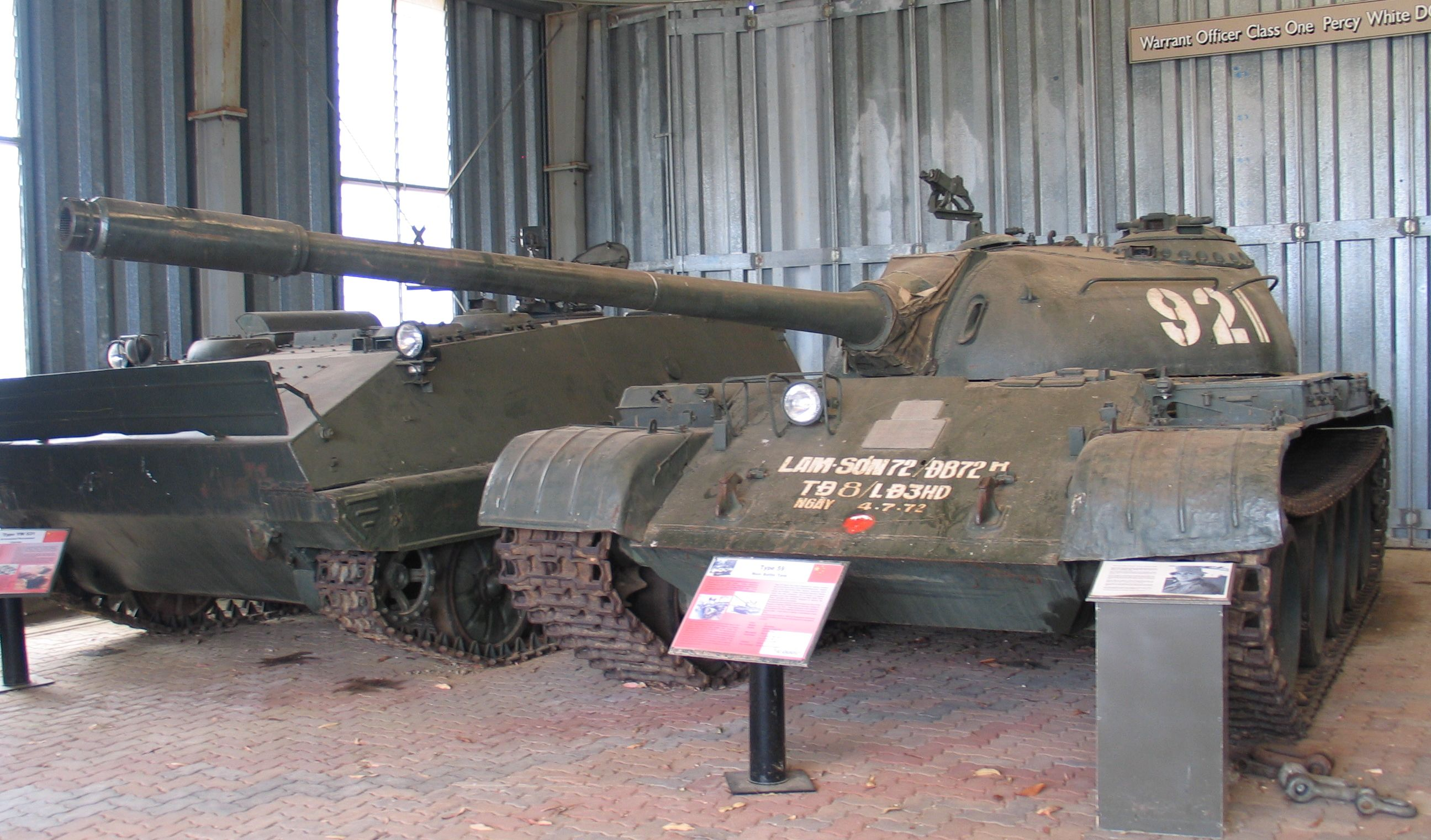
A former North Vietnamese Type 59 tank, captured by South Vietnamese ARVN troops on 4 July in 1972 during the Vietnam War, now on display at the Royal Australian Armoured Corps Tank Museum.

The first war involving the Type 59 was in Vietnam, where North Vietnam fielded at least several hundreds supplied directly from their Chinese ally against American tanks used by their South Vietnamese enemy, such as the M41 Walker Bulldog light tank and the M48 Patton main battle tank. Against the US tanks it faced in Vietnam, the Type 59, along with the similar T-54 tank of Soviet origin (also widely operated in the war by North Vietnam), achieved some success against enemy armour. Most of the losses of armour suffered by the US and South Vietnamese forces were to North Vietnamese infantry-based anti-tank weapons, such as the RPG-7, rather than to North Vietnam's own tanks and other armour.

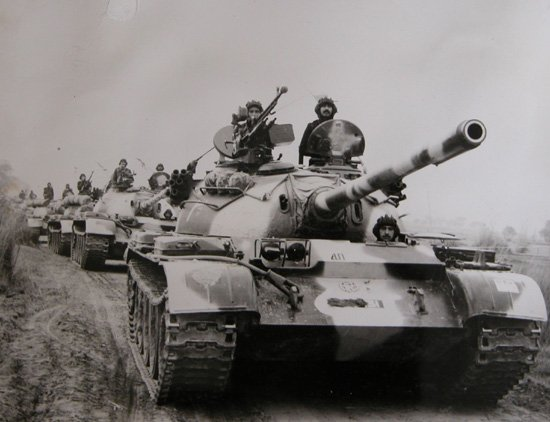
Pakistani Type 59 tanks during Indo-Pakistani War of 1971. They were acquired in 1966.

The Type 59 was also fielded during the Indo-Pakistani War of 1971, in the Battle of Longewala and Battle of Chamb, where Pakistani Type 59 tanks faced Indian T-54 and T-55 tanks.

Following the Vietnam War, the Sino-Vietnamese War of 1979 was the next largest use of Type 59 tanks to date in modern Chinese military history. China committed nearly 300 Type 59, Type 62, and Type 63 tanks and armoured fighting vehicles (AFVs) into the conflict against their former ally, with 48 of the total listed above lost to Vietnamese anti-tank action. The tanks of 42nd Corps, as the vanguard force responsible for cutting off the northern Vietnamese city of Cao Bằng, bore the brunt of the losses in armour and managed to advance only 30 km within 3 days. The poor performance of tanks and AFVs in this battle was attributed to the mountainous and hilly terrain in much of northern Vietnam that was inherently unsuitable for mechanized warfare, just like in Korea. The light armour on the Type 62 tank (a lighter version of the Type 59 which predominantly served as a combat-reconnaissance vehicle) also proved inadequate in protection against small and light anti-tank weapons, such as anti-tank grenades.

Iran received 300 Type 59 tanks from North Korea and China during the Iran–Iraq War. They were fielded by both the regular Artesh and the Islamic Revolutionary Guard Corps. The T-72 proved highly superior to the Chinese tank. On the other hand, Iraq received 1,000 Type 69s from China. The Iraqi Type 69 tanks were later used during the 1991 Gulf War.

The Sudan also used Type 59 tanks during the Second Sudanese Civil War. Five were lost to the Sudan People's Liberation Army near Yei in March 1997.

Type 59 tanks were involved in the Chinese government's violent crackdown on the 1989 Tiananmen Square protests, a column of which were obstructed in the Tank Man incident.

The Type 59s of the Zairian Special Presidential Division saw limited action in 1998 against the rebels of the Alliance of Democratic Forces for the Liberation of Congo.

== Variants ==
=== Domestic models ===
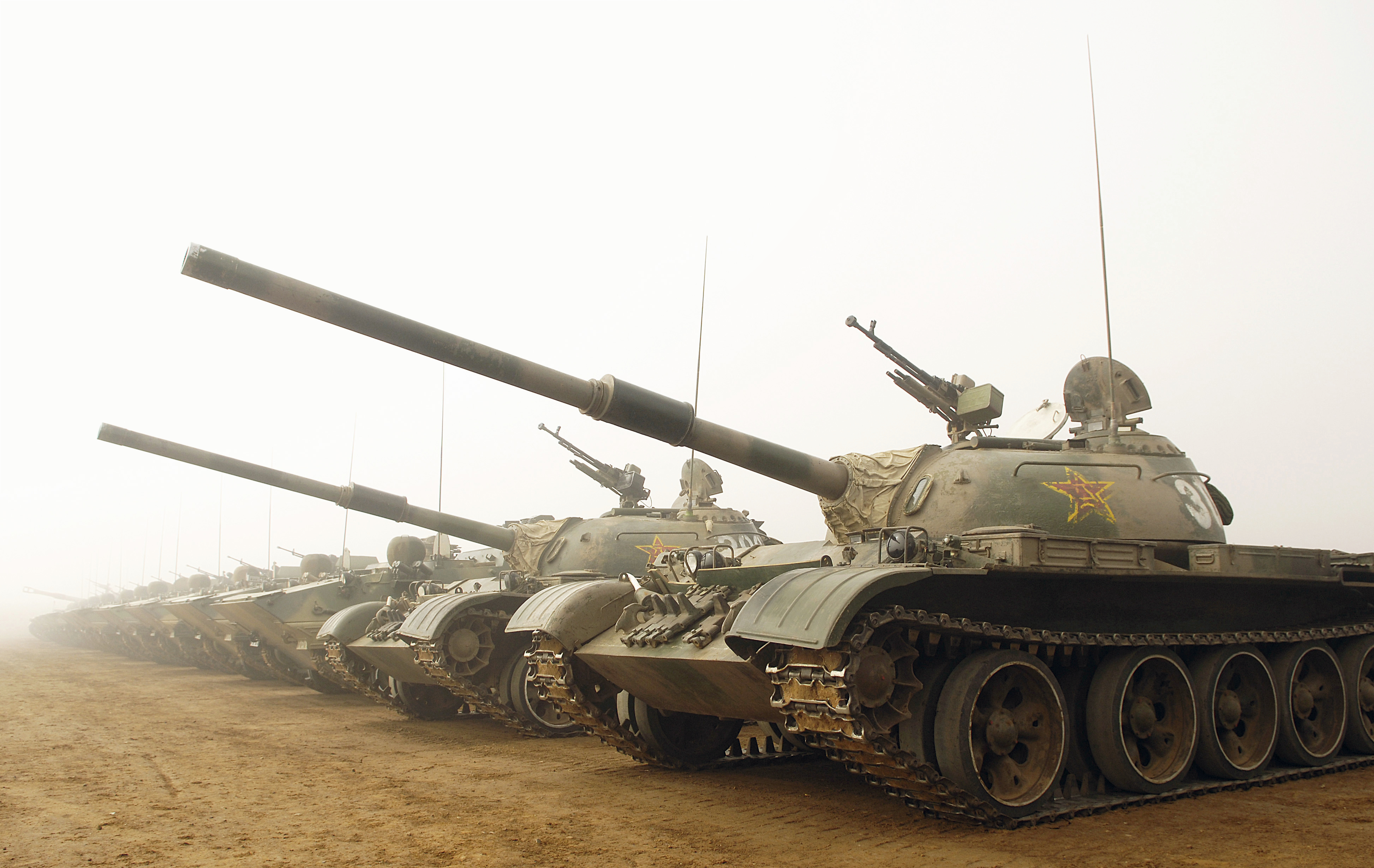
A line-up of Chinese armoured vehicles at Shenyang training base, in the foreground are two Type 59-II tanks. Note the bore evacuator in the middle of the barrel.

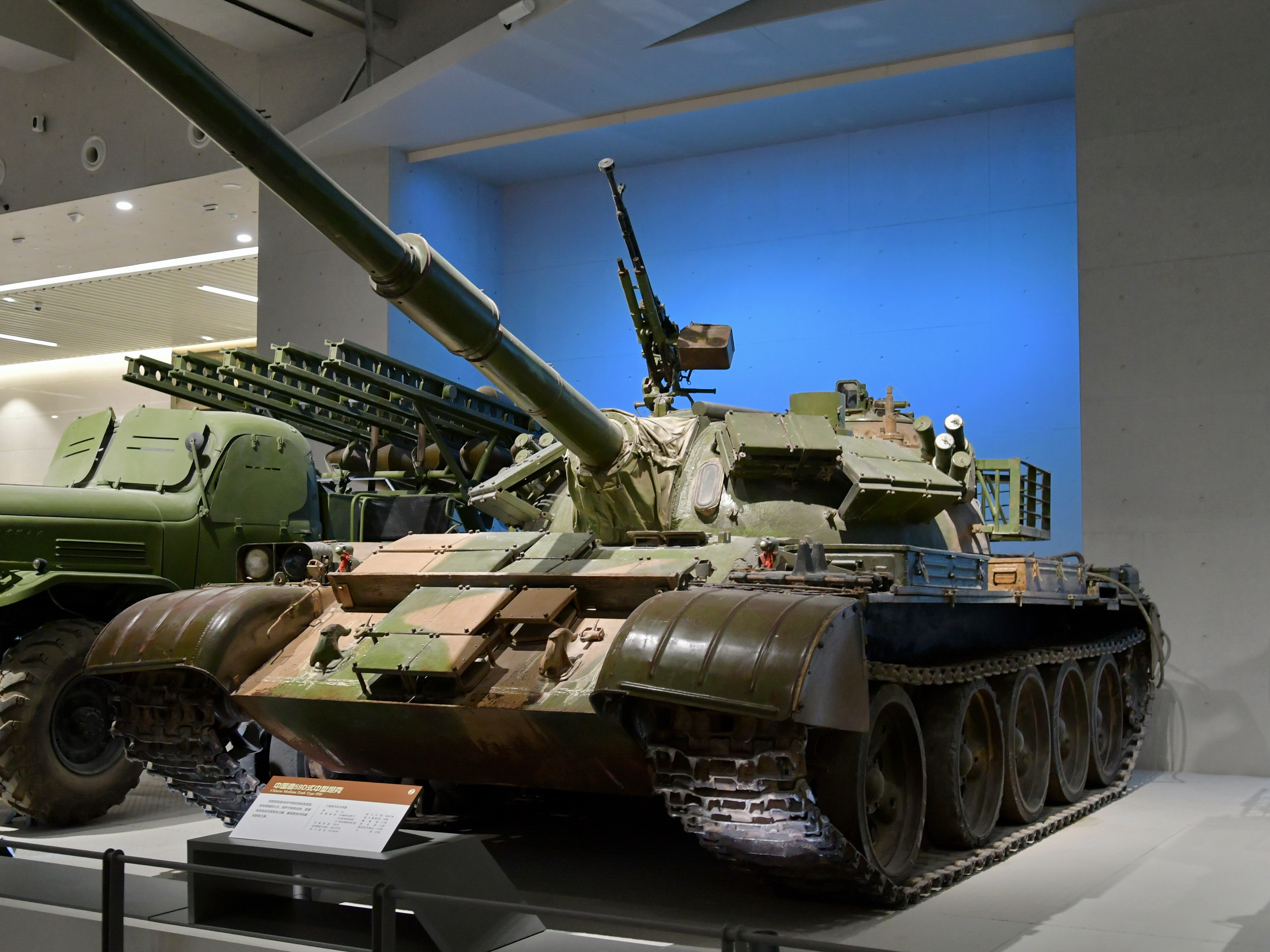
Type 59D tank

Type 59
The basic variant, a T-54A clone without an IR searchlight. Entered production in 1957. This vehicle is also known as the ZTZ59.

Type 59-I
Improved variant fitted with a Type 69-II 100 mm rifled gun, as well as a laser rangefinder, hydraulic servo-system, primitive fire-control system, automatic fire suppression system, and rubber track skirts. The Type 59-I includes several versions with different armour and fire control configurations. This vehicle is also known as the ZTZ59-I.

Type 59A
Intermediate variant between the Type 59-I and Type 59-II lacking a two-plane stabilizer and IR searchlight. The vehicle first entered production in 1984 and was designed to fill the gap while the Type 59-II was still in development. This vehicle is also known as the ZTZ59A.

Type 59-II
The Type 59-II (also known as WZ-120B) is an upgrade mounting a ZPL-81 105 mm rifled gun, a licence-built Royal Ordnance L7, and adding an image intensification/infrared night sight. Mass increased to 36.5 tonnes. This vehicle is also known as the ZTZ59-II.

Type 59-IIA
Although the Type 59-II was a very successful design, the tank still relied on the West to supply parts. As a result, the Type 59-IIA was developed. By the end of 1984, the China First Tractor Factory and other production facilities began to develop a further upgrade to the Type 59-II. A prototype was completed by October 1985, featuring an improved ZPL-81A with a thermal sleeve, new domestic light spot fire control system with a 2-axis stabiliser, and composite armour. The automatic fire suppression system and automatic fire extinguishing devices were improved so that they could be used while generating smoke or firing the onboard smoke grenade launchers. This vehicle is also known as the ZTZ59-IIA.

Type 59D1
The Type 59D1 (also known as WZ-120C) is an upgrade with explosive reactive armour, computerized stabilized fire-control system, the ZPL-83A 105 mm gun improved from the older Type 59-II, and a night vision system. This vehicle is also known as the ZTZ59D1.

Type 59D
Type 59D (also known as WZ-120D) is an upgrade of the Type 59D1. The Type 59D has a longer 105 mm gun at 62 caliber, known as the ZPL-94 or Type 94. The gun has a range of 2000 m, and may fire ATGMs out to 5500 m. A thermal sight is also available. This vehicle is also known as the ZTZ59D.

Type 59G
An upgrade of the Type 59.

Jaguar
The Jaguar was a prototype vehicle based on the Type 59 chassis that was jointly developed by the United States and China during 1980s, made possible by the US-Chinese détente of the 1970s. Planned to replace China's existing tank fleet, as well as for the export market, the tank featured improvements to the standard Type 59's engine, armament, armour, turret, optics, electronics, fire control and suspension. Following the Tiananmen Square protests of 1989, American-Chinese relations soured and the Chinese withdrew from the project. The Americans continued alone and successfully completed the design, however the end of the Cold War saw a glut in the international tank market and thus no orders were ever placed for the vehicle.

Type 62 Light Tank

In the late 1950s, the PLA submitted requirements for a light tank more suitable for operations in China's southern region. Development on the new Type 62 tank began in 1958, which was a scaled-down Type 59 MBT with simplified equipment. The Type 62 light tank entered batch production in 1963, and approx. 800 were produced by 1978. The Type 62 light tank weights only 21 tons, and is equipped with a Type 62-85TC 85 mm rifled gun, and 3 machine guns. An improved Type 62-I version was produced with better FCS with laser rangefinder, and turret storage racks for added protection. Other versions based on the Type 62 include the Type 79 recovery vehicle (prototype only) and Type 82 earth-mover.

The PLA deployed the Type 62 light tank to Vietnam during the 1979 Sino-Vietnam conflict. They found that the thin armour of the Type 62 tank could be penetrated easily by hand-held anti-tank weapons, such as the 40 mm RPG. The Type 62 tank suffered severe losses during the conflict, which convinced the PLA to develop new second-generation MBTs. The Type 62 tank received a major upgrade in 2000, with new welded turret, vertically stabilised 105 mm rifled gun, fire-control system, night vision device, smoke grenade launchers, and explosive reactive armor (ERA) package. This vehicle is also known as the ZTQ62.

Type 69 / 79

Improved Type 59 MBT built by 617 Factory (Inner Mongolia First Machine Group Co. Ltd). Only saw limited service in the PLA, but was an export success in the 1980s with more than 2,000 sold worldwide.

Type 73

This armoured recovery vehicle is a Type 59 with its turret removed. The vehicle is armed with a single 12.7 mm machine gun. This armoured recovery vehicle is not believed to have a winch and is limited to towing operations.

Type 59 Heavy Infantry Fighting Vehicle

The modernized HIFV model of Type 59 weighs around 40 tons (or around 35 tons, sources differ here) and can carry up to seven passengers. Modifications include moving the engine to the front of the vehicle chassis, increasing tank armour including explosive reactive armour on all sides, and installing a rear door for dismounting infantry. the VN11 uses a turret similar to the Type 86 turret.

QN-506

It is a modernised variant of the Type 59 using the tank's chassis similar to its Russian counterpart the BMPT Terminator. The vehicle was first appeared at the Zhuhai Air Show in China in November 2018, and is armed with four QN-502C anti-tank missiles, twenty QN-201 multi-purpose mini missiles, four S-570 loitering munitions, an unmanned 30 mm cannon, a 7.62 mm machine gun, six grenade launchers, and a quadcopter surveillance drone.

=== Foreign variants ===
==== Bangladesh ====
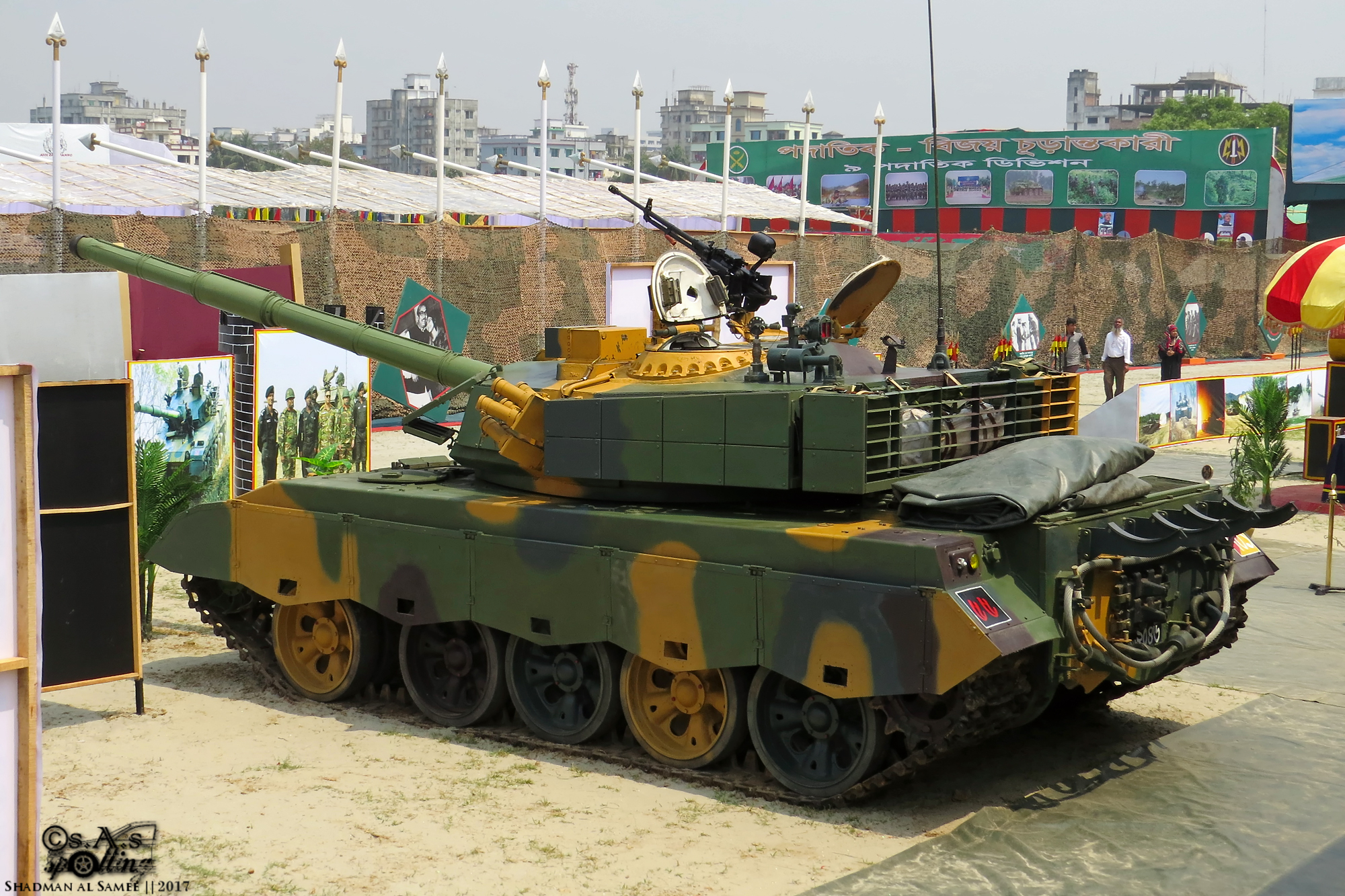
Bangladesh Army upgraded Durjoy MBT at Military Hardware Display 2017

The Type 59 Durjoy is a highly modernized version of the Bangladesh Army. The Bangladesh Army's old Type 59 tanks were upgraded similar to Type 59G standard at 902 Central Workshop of the Bangladesh Machine Tools Factory with Chinese assistance. Bangladesh Army renamed the tank as Durjoy (Bengali: দুর্জয়). Improvements includes:

- 125mm main gun with new turret (similar to that of the Type 96A turret) 28 rounds, Type-85 12.7×108mm Commander's machine gun (3,000 rounds), Co-axial 7.62mm gun (600 rounds), 81mm Smoke grenades.
- The Durjoy's APFSDS round can penetrate over 500mm of RHA at 2 km
- Chinese 3rd generation ERA on front, turret and side skirts. Modular Composite armour on turret front. Cage armour on back of turret to protect from RPG hits.
- To enhance crew comfort the Durjoy is fitted with air-conditioning and complete NBC protection system
- Collective Fire suppression system.
- Laser warning receiver, Laser designator, Fire control system, Combat data link, Thermal imaging system.
- 730 H.P. Diesel engine
- Barrel launched ATGM firing capability.
- Rubber padded tracks.
- XDZ-1 SATCOM and VRC-2000L radio contact system.

France

France acquired a Type 59 to modify it to sell a new upgrade package made by Giat industry, to other countries, notably in the development of a new tank for Egypt which seeks a new tank based on the T-62 with western weaponry. the tank was called T59 and included a French 105mm gun, a new ballistic computer, new fire-control, French thermal, new sight, and a new fire-extinguisher system. The vehicle was presented in Satory 1987 but saw no success.

==== Pakistan ====
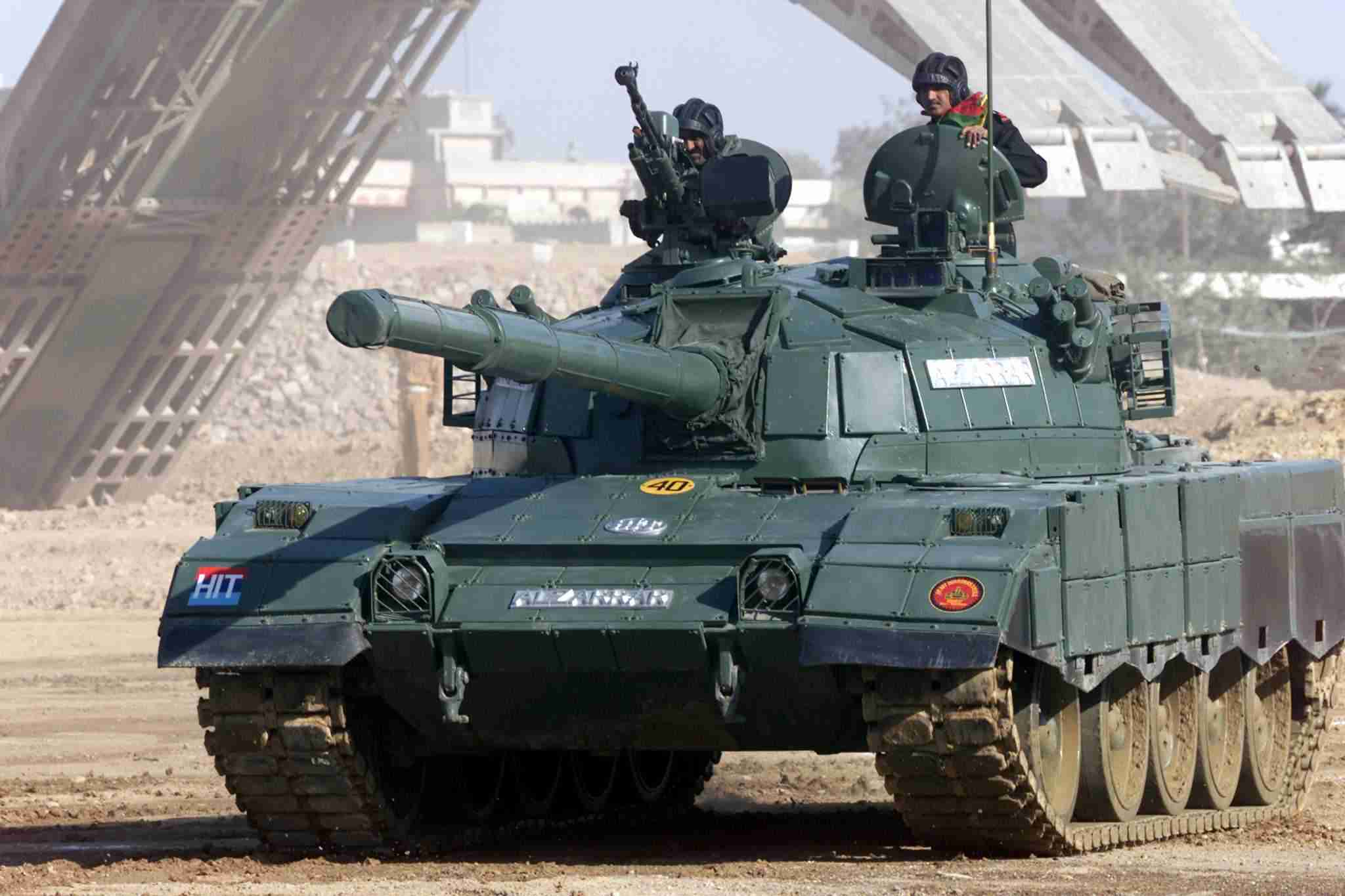
An Al-Zarrar MBT on display at a defense exhibition, Karachi, Pakistan (2006)

Pakistan operates Al-Zarrar – Heavy Industries Taxila of Pakistan has introduced the Al-Zarrar Main Battle Tank. The Al-Zarrar series was designed to improve and rebuild the Pakistani army's Type 59 tanks by way of more modern armament, fire control, defensive equipment, etc. Improvements include:

  - 125 mm smoothbore gun, firing APFSDS, HEAT-FS and HE-FS. Semi-automatic loading and image Stabilized fire control.
  - 730 hp Engine for improved mobility.
  - Improved suspension.
  - Improved defense with explosive reactive armour and anti-mine cover underneath.

==== Iran ====
Iran operates Type T-72Z - a modernized version.

==== North Korea ====
North Korea operates Kok'san – 170 mm artillery piece, based on the Type 59 chassis.

==== United Kingdom ====
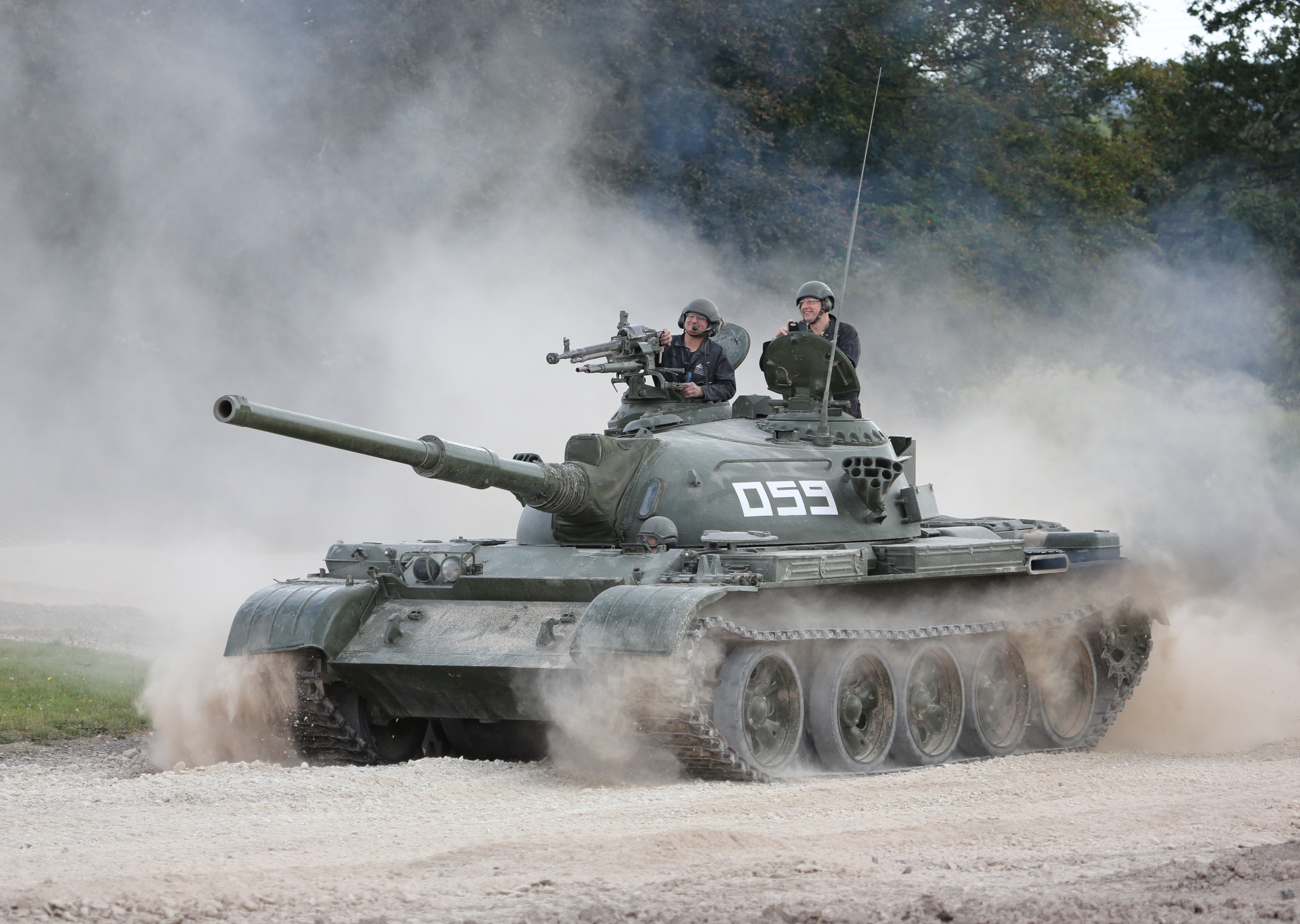
Royal Ordnance-upgraded Type 59 at The Tank Museum in 2014

Royal Ordnance designed variants with 105 mm Royal Ordnance L7 gun as an upgrade package for owners of the Type 59. The upgrades incorporated 105 mm L7A3 gun with thermal sleeve and ammunition stowage of 34 rounds, British smoke grenade dischargers on both sides of the turret, Graviner fire-suppression system, Vickers Instruments L50 gunner's sight with laser-rangefinder, Avimo driver's sight night-vision device, Marconi's Centaur weapon system with digital FCS, Mantis commander's sight and solid-state drives. Another upgrade package also installed ROMOR-A reactive armour on the side hulls and ROMOR-B passive appliqué armour on the front hull and turret, along with the aforementioned upgrades. The Type 59 tanks used in the project were acquired from Pakistan, and the upgraded tanks were exhibited in British Army Equipment Exhibition 1984. No Type 59s served with British forces.

Marconi offered their Marksman anti-aircraft system as a conversion to operators of the Type 59. The Marksman consisted of a twin 35 mm autocannon system in a turret that could be fitted to almost any MBT.

== Operators ==
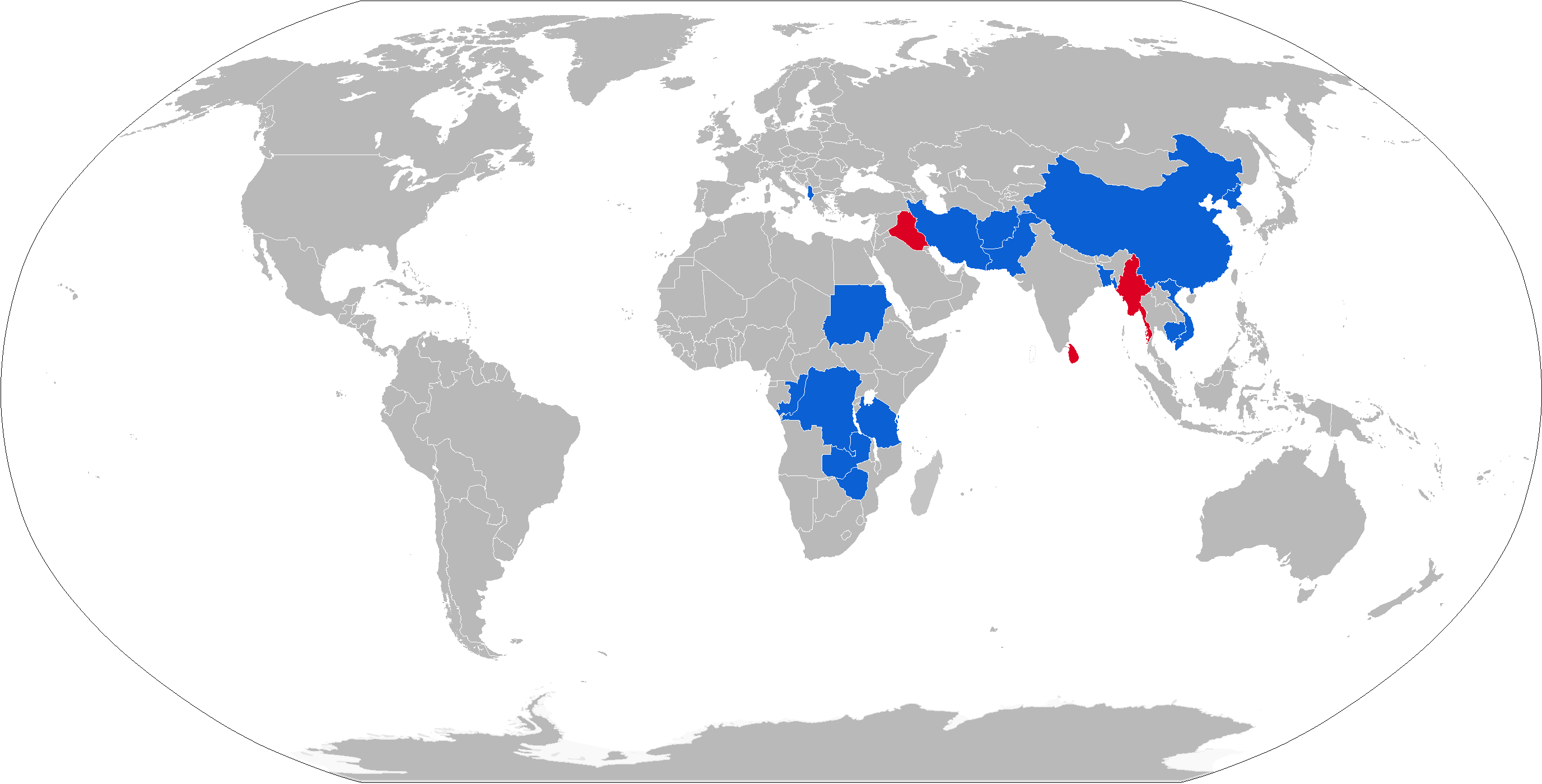
Operators Current Former

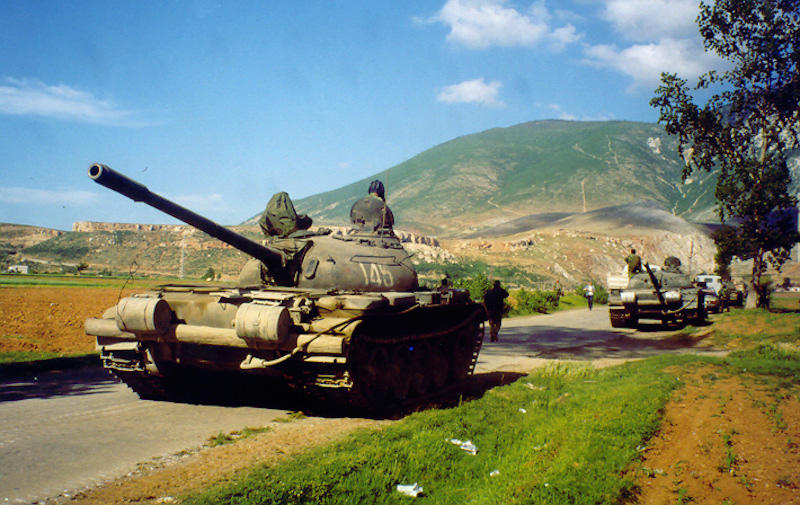
Albanian Type 59 tanks at the border during the Albanian-Yugoslav Border Incident of 1999.

=== Current operators ===
- Bangladesh − 30 T-54 delivered by Egypt in 1975; later converted to use Type 59 parts with support from China. 36 Type 59s delivered by China in 1980–1981. 174 Type 59 and Type 59G Durjoy in service as of 2024
- Cambodia − 50 Type 59s in service as of 2024, several Type 59D were delivered in 2026 with 39 out of 93 delivered.
- Chad − 14 ZTZ-59G in service as of 2024
- Democratic Republic of the Congo − Between 12 and 17 Type 59s as of 2023, but may be unserviceable
- Republic of the Congo − ~15 delivered by China in 1978. 15 in service as of 2024
- Iran − ~300 Type 59s delivered by China from 1982–1984. Unknown number of Type 59 tanks and Safir 74 conversions in service as of 2023
- Myanmar − More than 250 units of Type-59D in service as of 2024.
- North Korea − ~175 Type 59s delivered by China from 1973–1975. ~250 ZSU-57-2 turrets delivered by the Soviet Union in 1968–1977 and fitted to Type 59 hulls from China. 175 Type 59s in service as of 2005. Unknown number in service as of 2023
- Pakistan − ~200 Type 59s delivered by China from 1965–1966; ~550 Type 59s delivered from 1967–1970; ~100 Type 59s delivered as aid in 1972; ~825 delivered from 1978 to 1988. 1,200 in service in 2005, 600 ZTZ-59 in service as of 2024. Some were upgraded with a 105mm gun
- Sudan − 50 Type 59s delivered by China in 1972; according to SIPRI, rebuilt to the Type-59D standard between 2010 and 2015. 50 were in service prior to the current civil war in the country
- Tanzania − ~30 Type 59s delivered by China from 1971–1973; according to SIPRI, these were rebuilt as Type 59Gs from 2011–2013. 15 Type-59Gs in service as of 2024
- Vietnam − 350 as of 2024
- Zambia − 20 ZTZ-59 in service as of 2024
- Zimbabwe − ~22 delivered by China in 1985 and 1986. 30 in service in 2006; 30 in service as of 2023, but may be unserviceable.

=== Former operators ===
- Albania − ~721 Type 59 delivered by China in 1966–1975. 373 in service in 2005, 40 in service in 2008, 3 in 2010, none in 2015
- Bosnia and Herzegovina − 71 in 2005, none in 2015
- Iraq − 250-1,300 Type 59s delivered by China from 1982–1987, and ~1,500 Type 69-I and 69-IIs delivered from 1983–1987. ~3,000 T-54, T-55, Type 59 and Type 69s before the Gulf War. 1,000 T-54, T-55, T-72, Type 59 and Type 69s in service in 2003. All destroyed or scrapped after the 2003 invasion of Iraq
- Sri Lanka − ~25 Type 59 delivered by China in 1991. None in service by 2010
- South Vietnam − Captured from People's Army of Vietnam

== See also ==
- Type 69/79 – (China)
- Type 80/85/88 – (China)
- Type 96 – (China)
- Type 90/MBT-2000 – (China, Pakistan)
- Type 99 – (China)
- T-54 – (Soviet Union)

== Bibliography ==
- Cordesman, Anthony H. (7 February 2003). Iraqi Armed Forces on the Edge of War (PDF) (Report). Center for Strategic and International Studies. p. 26. Archived from the original (PDF) on 9 February 2010.
- Gelbart, Marsh (1996). Tanks: Main Battle and Light Tanks. London: Brassey's. ISBN 1-85753-168-X.
- International Institute for Strategic Studies (2010). The Military Balance 2010. Taylor & Francis Group. ISBN 978-1-85743-557-3.
- International Institute for Strategic Studies (11 February 2015). The Military Balance 2015. Routledge. ISBN 978-1-85743-766-9.
- International Institute for Strategic Studies (15 February 2023). The Military Balance 2023. Taylor & Francis. ISBN 978-1-000-91070-4.
- International Institute for Strategic Studies (13 February 2024). The Military Balance 2024. Routledge. ISBN 9781032780047.
