= Chinese firefighting tank =

2001 vehicle

The Chinese firefighting tank is a firefighting vehicle developed in China using a Type 69/79 main battle tank chassis and is used to fight hazardous fires.

The tank is built by Inner Mongolia Century Fire Fighting Technology Corporation and the Inner Mongolia No.1 Machinery Group and first appeared in 2001 and lately at a fireworks fire in Guangdong Province in 2008. The local fire department in Wuhan, Hubei purchased one tank in May 2010 for 3.2 million yuan.

The tank is designed to be able to operate in places such as oil plants and chemical factories. The tank is armoured and fire protected with an external water tank in the rear. The steel armour has a heatproof layer intended to protect crew from heat and explosions, and the tank is designed to be able to crush and remove obstacles, allowing it to provide firefighting in cases where access to the area is difficult for standard firefighting crew due to environmental hazards. The tank has an electronically controlled gun with water and two foam retardant guns. There is also an internal warning system for toxic gases, and a sprinkler system designed to reduce the external temperature.
