= Type 99 tank =

2001 Chinese main battle tank

Type 99
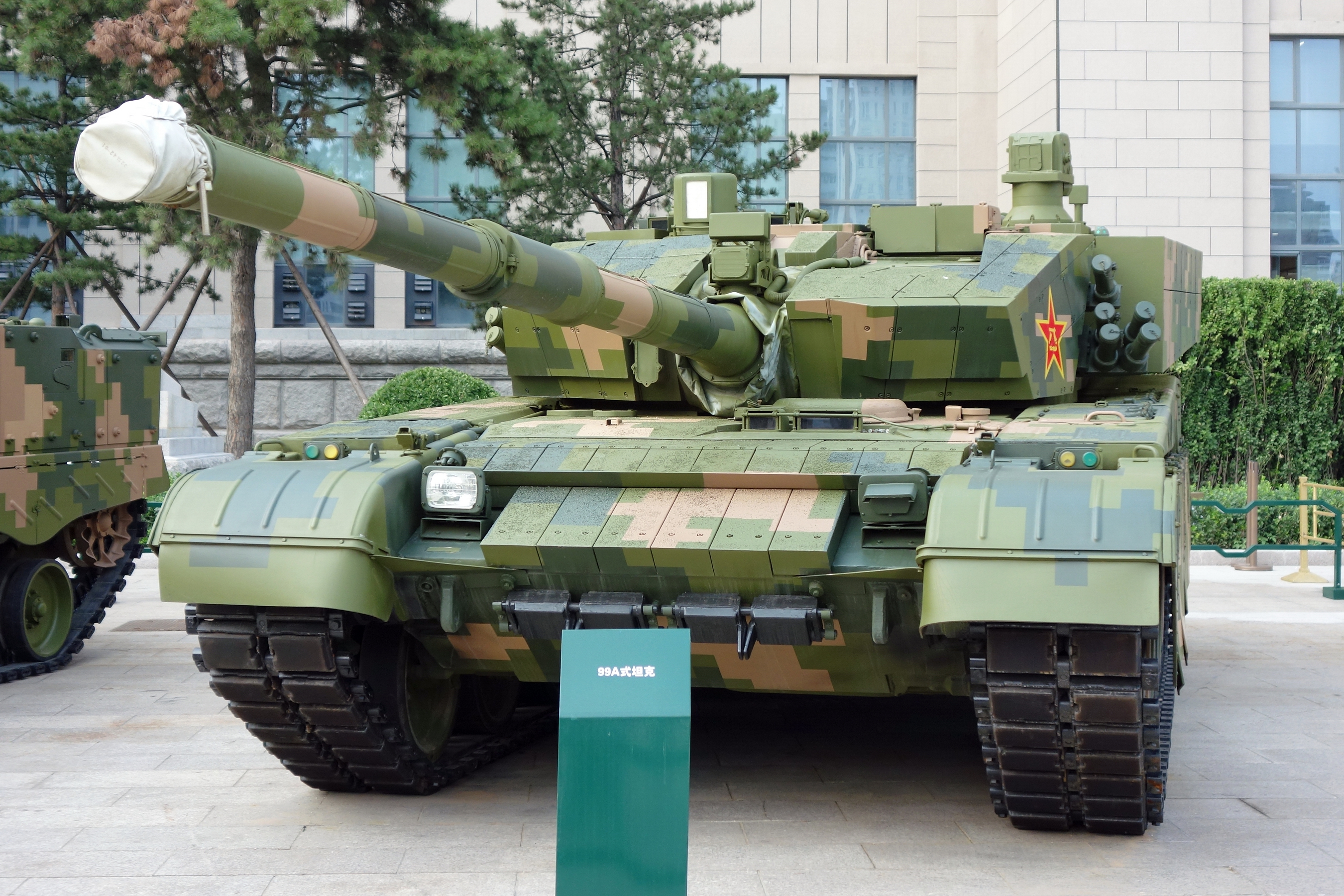
- Front view of Type 99A tank
- Type: Main battle tank
- Place of origin: China

Service history
- In service: 2001 (Type 99); 2011–present (Type 99A)
- Used by: See Operators

Production history
- Designer: 201st Research Institute
- Manufacturer: Baotou Tank Plant
- Unit cost: $2.5 million
- Produced: 1998–2001 (Type 98); 2001–2011 (Type 99); 2007–present (Type 99A)
- No. built: ~1,400

Specifications
- Mass: 51 tonnes (Type 98); 55 tonnes (Type 99A)
- Length: Hull: 7.6 metres (25 ft); Gun forward: 11 metres (36 ft)
- Width: Hull: 3.7 metres (12 ft)
- Height: Hull: 2.35 metres (7.7 ft)
- Crew: 3 (commander, driver, gunner)
- Armor: Classified. Anticipated to be welded turret with applique and modular composite/reactive armor
- Main armament: 125mm ZPT-98 smoothbore gun (42 Rounds; autoloader)
- Secondary armament: QJC-88 heavy machine gun Type 86 coaxial machine gun
- Engine: 150HB liquid-cooled V12 twin-turbo diesel 33.9 litre 1,500 hp (1,119 kW)
- Power/weight: 27.78 hp/tonne
- Suspension: Torsion bar suspension
- Operational range: 600 kilometres (370 mi)–650 kilometres (400 mi)
- Maximum speed: Road: 76 kilometres per hour (47 mph) (Type 99A) Off-road: 54 kilometres per hour (34 mph)

The Type 99 (Chinese: 99式主战坦克; pinyin: Jiǔjiǔshì Zhǔzhàn Tǎnkè) or ZTZ-99 is a Chinese third generation main battle tank (MBT). The vehicle was a replacement for the aging Type 88 introduced in the late 1980s. The Type 99 MBT was China's first mass-produced third-generation main battle tank. Combining modular composite armour and tandem-charge defeating ERA, 125 mm smoothbore gun with ATGM-capability, high mobility, digital systems and optics, the Type 99 represents a shift towards rapid modernization by the PLA.

The Type 99 is based on the Soviet T-72 chassis. The tank entered People's Liberation Army (PLA) service in 2001. The People's Liberation Army Ground Force (PLAGF) is the sole operator of the Type 99. Three main versions of the Type 99 have been deployed: the Type 98 prototype, Type 99 and the Type 99A. The Type 99 forms the core of China’s modern maneuver combat capabilities, with over 1,300 tanks built for the past two decades.

== Development ==
The development of China's domestic third generation MBT was started in 1989, under China's eighth five-year plan. In the early 1990s China produced one of its second generation prototypes, the Type 90-II series. The Type 90-II was designed by studying the T-72 tank. The chassis was to be based on the T-72's hull but with Chinese subsystems. The Type 90-II had a 125mm smoothbore cannon with an autoloader, modular composite armor and a centered driver position. While the Type 90-II series ultimately did not enter PLA service, it saw success as an export tank and was built under license in Pakistan as the Al-Khalid.

The Type 98 or WZ-123 was China's domestic Type 90-II derivative. It was based on the T-72 chassis. It was first seen in rehearsals for the 1999 National Day parade and was officially revealed on 1 October 1999.

An improved version was shortly produced and was named the Type 98G or Type 99.

An updated Type 99 model was officially introduced at the 2015 Victory Day Parade as the Type 99A. This variant had previously been used by PLA troops during the Shanghai Cooperation Organization (SCO) military exercises in 2014.

=== Deployment ===
By 2008, 200 Type 98 and Type 99 tanks may have been deployed to the Beijing and Shenyang Military Regions. The Type 99 has seen less deployment than other tanks in PLA service due to cost factors. By 2024, more than 1,300 units of Type 99 and Type 99A have been deployed into the PLAGF service, forming the core maneuvering force of the PLA heavy combined arms brigades.

== Design ==
The Type 98/99 hull appears similar to the Soviet T-72 on which it is based, but it is longer.

=== Armament ===
The main armament is a 2-plane stabilized ZPT-98 125 mm smoothbore gun with a carousel-style autoloader. The weapon system is derived from Soviet 2A46 tank gun and AZ autoloader in the T-72. The gun may be fired under computerized or manual control. The tank can carry 42 rounds including 22 in the autoloader. The rate of fire is 8 rounds per minute using the autoloader, and 2 rounds per minute with manual loading. The Type 99A mounts an improved 125 mm gun, with a new autoloader capable of firing 10 rounds per minute.

The 125 mm gun of the Type 99 is capable of firing APFSDS-T, HEAT, Frag-HE-T, and gun-launched anti-tank missiles (ATGM). The gun may fire a range of Chinese, Russian, and ex-Warsaw Pact ammunition. The Type 99 can fire tandem shaped charged GP125 ATGMs similar to the Russian Invar with a range of up to 5 kilometres. The 9M119 ATGMs were approved for domestic licensed production by Russia.

Secondary armament consists of a QJC-88 12.7 mm machine gun on the commander's cupola and a coaxial 7.62 mm MG. The 12.7 mm machine gun has an elevation of -4 to 75 degrees.

=== Fire control ===
The Type 99 has hunter-killer capabilities, operating an ISFCS-212 fire control system with an IR automatic target tracker. It is capable of firing on the move with a dual-axis stabilized main gun, stabilized gunner thermal sight, an advanced ballistic computer and a laser range finder. The gunner has a maximum target acquisition range of 5 kilometres. The gunner's thermal sight has optical magnification at 5x and 11.4x. The commander also has access to an independent thermal sight with auto-tracking targeting capabilities. A wide range of sensor data is displayed through a computer system to achieve quicker command response.

The Type 99A MBT is equipped with an improved fire control system (which includes a new 3rd generation thermal imaging sight, ballistic computer and weather measurement sensors) thus improving ballistic trajectory under adverse conditions. The commander also has an independent panoramic sight with laser range-finding function that can rotate 360 degrees. Both the gunner and commander sight is fully stabilized and capable of day/night operations.

Type 99A is fitted with ST-16 millimeter wave radar suite, designed for target identification (IFF), acquisition and track. The original Type 99 utilizes the onboard active laser defense system for identification friend or foe application, but the function may be compromised under adverse weather condition. The radar system instead offers a more reliable all-weather operation capability. Type 99A's fire control computer can also automatically measure, identify and correct firing errors with muzzle reference system (MRS) mounted at the tip of the gun barrel as well as position sensitive detector (PSD) situated at the base of the barrel underneath the millimeter-wave radar panel, ensuring greater hit probability in sophisticated battlefield environments.

Type 99 and Type 99A are fitted with digital map interface, BeiDou global positioning system, UHF/VHF radio, encrypted laser communication system, and other form of communication devices along with an inertial navigation system as well as a C4ISR battle management system used in conjunction with the data-link and communication systems to coordinate combat with other forces such as aircraft and infantry.

=== Protection ===
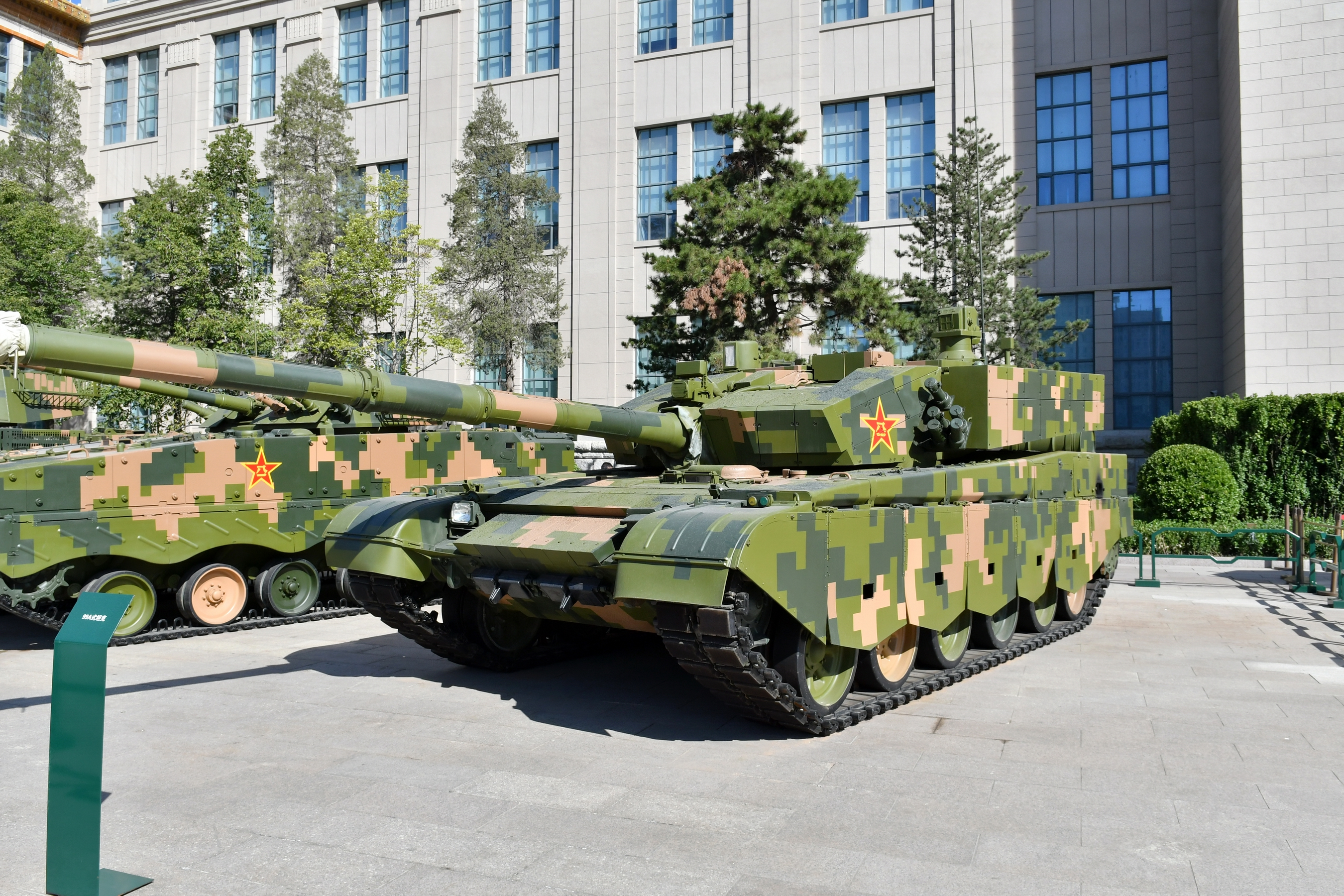
Type 99A's frontal armor packs

The tank's welded turret is of an angular design with spaced modular armor and composite panels. Applique armor consists of modular armor mentioned above and track skirts. The Type 99A may mount 3rd generation (Relikt-type) ERA that provides protection against tandem-charge warheads. It has a nuclear-biological-chemical protection system as well as fire detection and suppression system. The storage baskets on the turret sides and rear are buffer spaces, and are protected by ERA. The tank is also equipped with an active protection system. Type 99A's protection performance, in combination of the traditional armor, composite mix and reactive armor, is equivalent to HEAT more than 1000mm of rolled homogeneous armor (RHA), according to an interview with the tank's commander.

The tank features multiple countermeasure systems for additional protection, including laser-based self defense weapon (LSDW) system, laser warning receiver system, twelve 81-mm smoke grenade launchers, and smoke screen generated by injecting fuel into the engines. In September 2024, the Type 99 tank was spotted with the GL-6 hard-kill active protection system (APS), which features two APS projectile launchers and four fire control radars. The GL-6 is designed to intercept and destroy attacks from both ground and air angles.

The box-shaped JD-3 (also known as ZM-87) active laser self-defense weapon (LSDW) is installed on the rotating platform behind the tank commander hatch for all Type 99 variants. First seen on the Type 98 prototype, consecutive improvements have been introduced over the years. Type 99A features a smaller, more compact LSDW. After the laser warning receiver receives enemy laser illumination, the system would automatically alert the crew, and activate low-intensity laser to search and locate the enemy's laser source, then intensifying the beam to blind the enemy gunner, damage or destroy enemy's optic sensors. The high-powered laser can engage both ground vehicles and helicopters, disrupting the guidance signal or damaging the gunner's eyesight. The jammer is capable of interfering with anti-tank guided missiles (ATGM) utilizing SACLOS such as the MILAN. The LSDW has a reported effective range of 3,000 metres (9,800 ft) on Type 99, and 4,000 metres (13,000 ft) on Type 99A. JD-3 (ZM-87) system also integrates laser transmitter, serving for both the line-of-sight (LOS) communication and the identification friend or foe (IFF) purpose.

=== Mobility ===
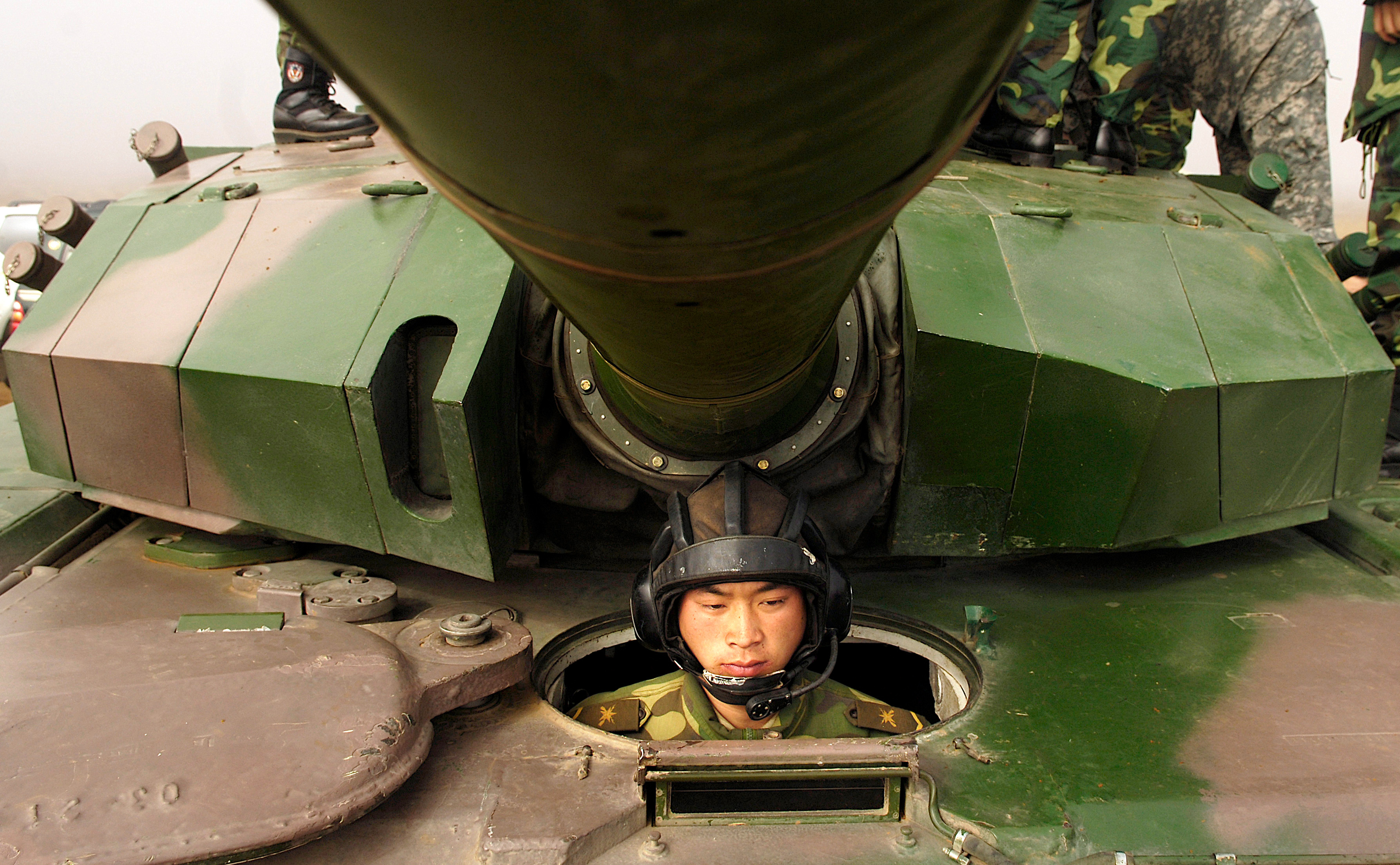
Type 99 MBT driver's position

The driver sits in the center front of the hull. The latest Type 99A shows the driver's hatch in the center left of the hull. Type 99 features a torsion bar suspension system that consists of six rubber-tired road wheels on each side with a power sprocket at the rear. The first, second, and sixth road wheels are fitted with a special hydraulic shock buffer. The Type 99A tank is powered by a HP150 1500 hp diesel engine, giving it a power-to-weight ratio of about 27.78 hp/ton. The original Type 99 had a manual transmission but later Type 99 variants have a CH1000 hydraulic-mechanical semi-automatic transmission with six forward gears and two reverse gears. The maximum road and off-road speeds are 80 km/h and 60 km/h respectively. The cruising range is 500 km (310 mi). The Type 99A is controlled by a steering wheel/yoke with stick-shift transmission capable of manual and automatic modes. The tank also uses gas and brake pedals similar to that of a standard motor vehicle.

The tank can be equipped with a snorkel for deep fording. With the deep fording kit, the Type 99A can cross waters up to 4.5 meters in depth.

== Variants ==
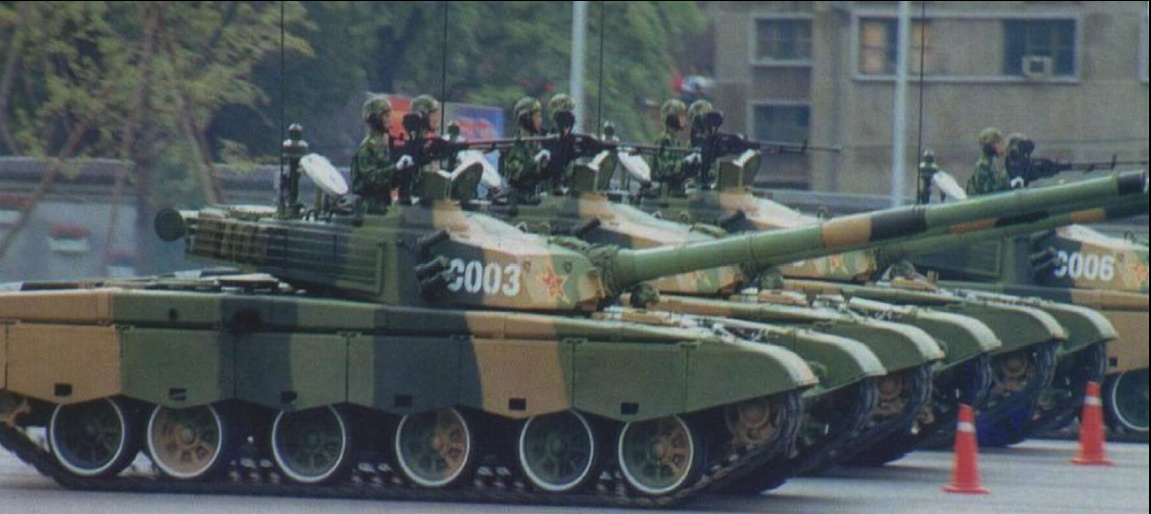
Type 98 tank prototype (9910) at the 1999 National Day parade.

=== Project 9910 prototype ===
Also known as the Type 98, WZ-123. The early pre-production (small batch production) prototype was called Project 9910. Features included composite armor panels and a 1200 hp diesel engine. 1st generation ERA may have been an option. The armor layout of the early pre-production prototype may have been similar to the T-80U and T-80UK.

=== Type 99 ===
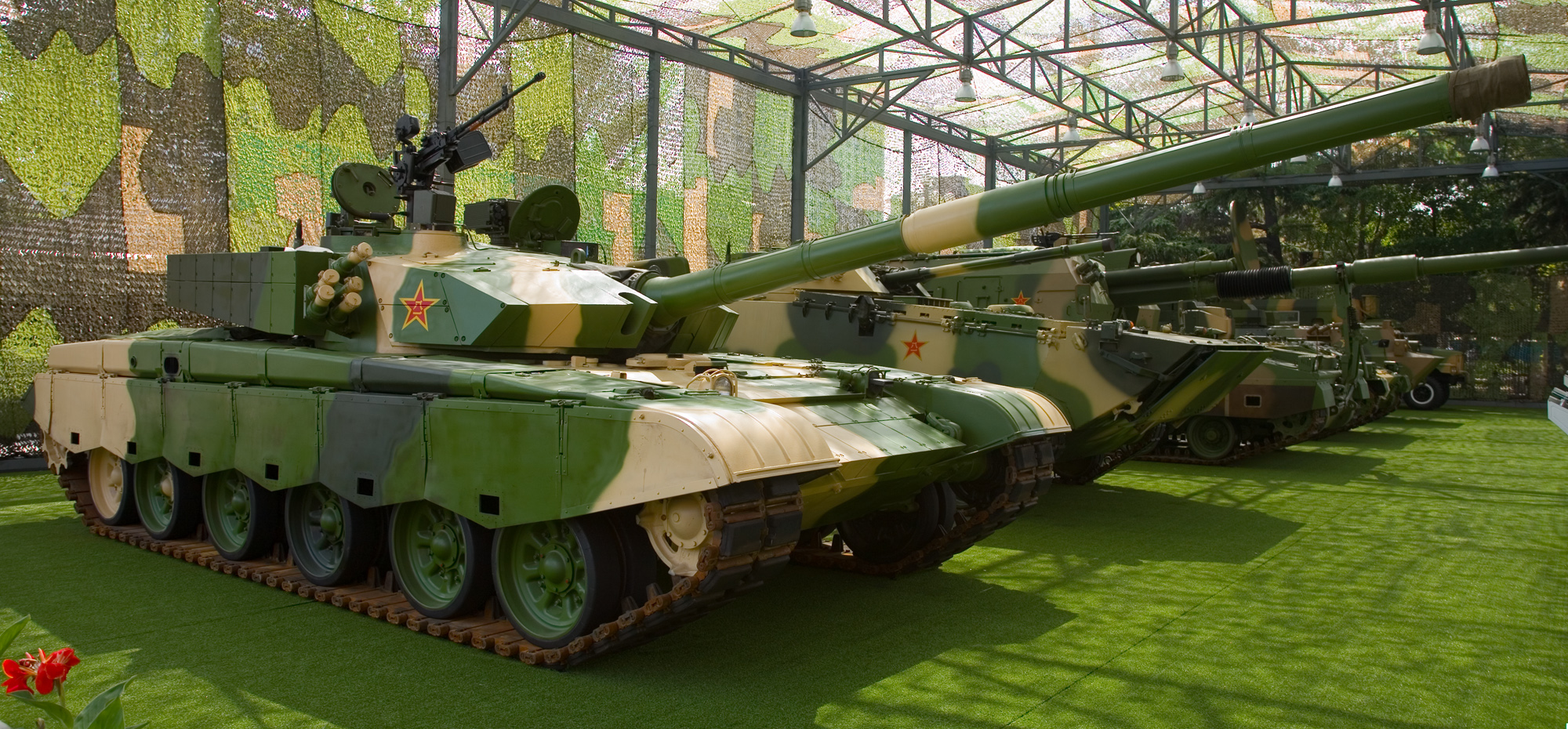
Type 99 front right view. Note the distinctive wedged shaped turret and applique armor panels on turret front and sides

Also known as the Type 99G and Type 99A1. Upgradable from small batch pre-production prototype. The tank features a new wedge-shaped turret and applique armor panels on turret front and sides, and upgraded to third generation ERA and second generation thermal sight, and a semi-automatic transmission. Type 99 officially went into service in 2001. A mid-life upgrade was commenced around 2008, called ZTZ-99 Phase-II to distinguish it from the initial production model. The new iteration featured a new angled turret and revised ERA blocks.

=== Type 99A ===
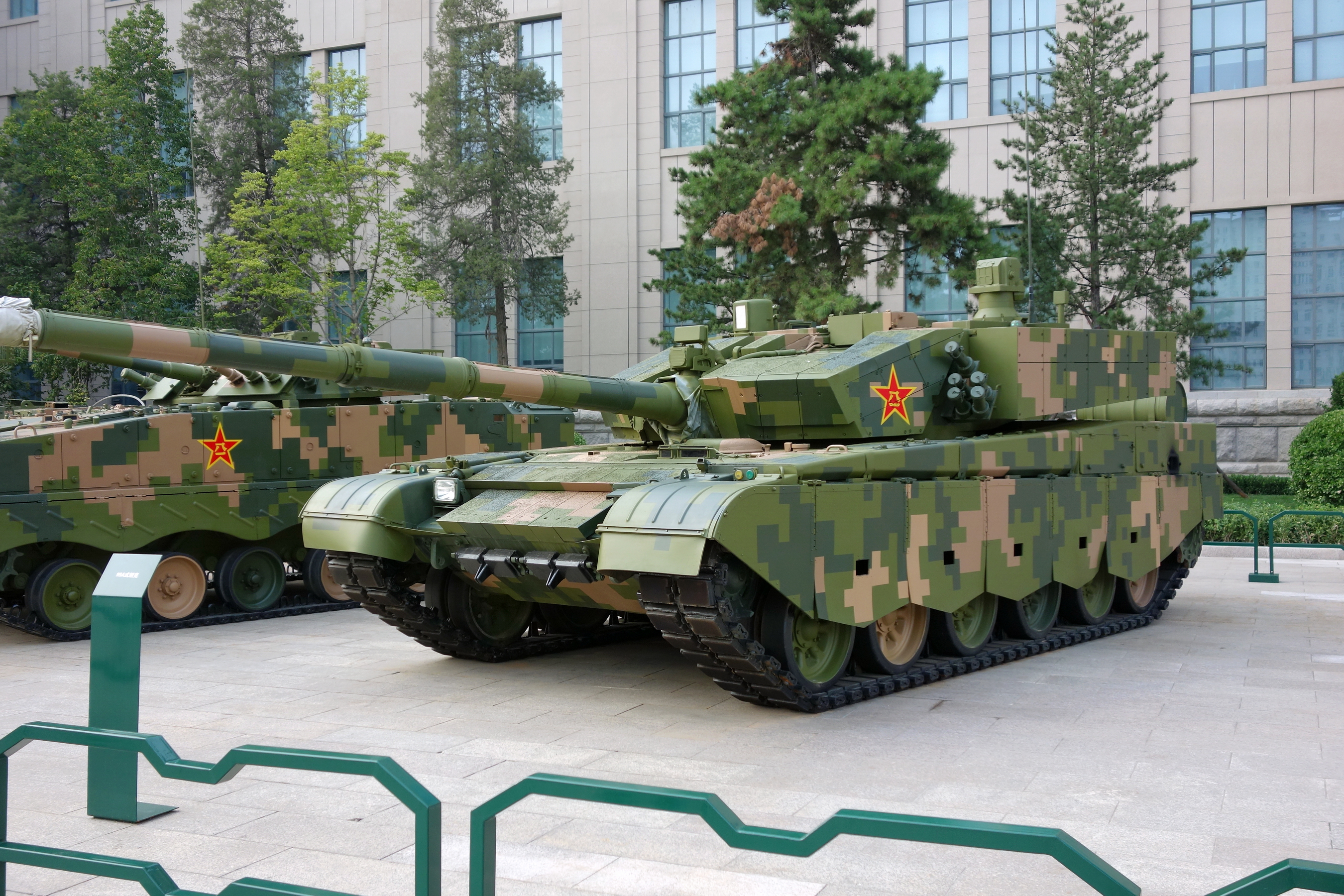
Type 99A tank

Improved Type 99. In 2003, the 99A model was developed. Prototype testing was underway by August 2007 and believed to be the standard deployed Type 99 variant in 2011. The position of the driver's hatch was moved from the centre left to the centre right of the hull. The improved main gun carries a Invar-type ATGM. It mounts a type of 3rd generation ERA, and an active protection system. The tank has a new, larger arrow-shaped turret with applique ERA armor. The larger turret has improved armour and a commander's periscope, and the tank has an integrated propulsion system. The 1,200 hp (890 kW) engine is replaced with a 1,500 hp (1,100 kW) engine. The tank also features a laser warning receiver.

==== Type 99A Upgraded Variant ====
This model has ERA installed on the glacis turret front and turret sides. It was in testing as of 2011. It is most likely this refers to a normal Type 99A, as the A2 nomenclature is not known to be used by the People's Liberation Army.

=== Type 99B ===
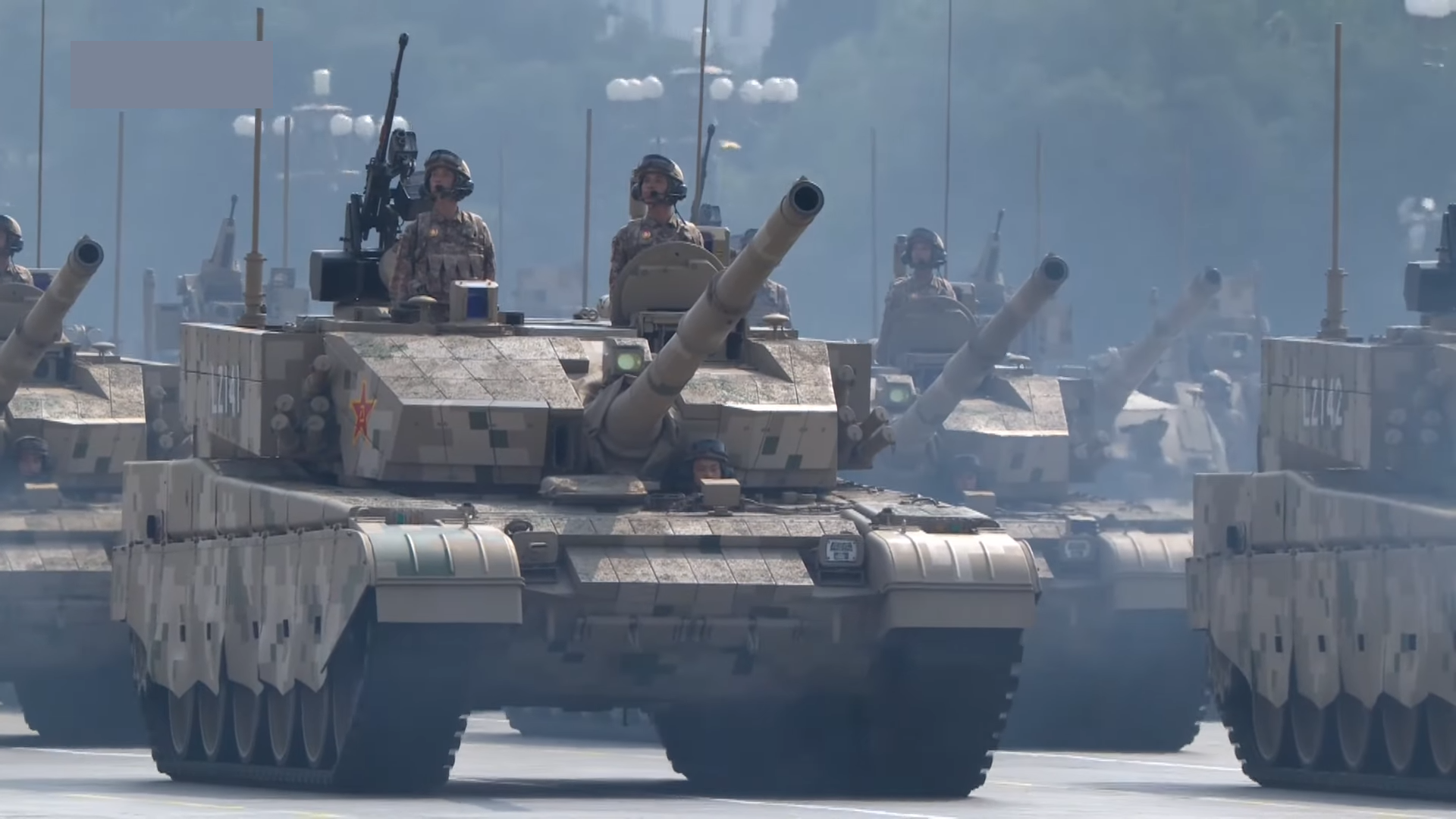
Type 99B at the 2025 China Victory Day Parade

The Type-99B upgraded variant was officially unveiled at the 2025 China Victory Day Parade. In 2024, the Type 99B prototype, fitted with two GL-6 APS launchers and four radars, was spotted in China. Improvements include with new and improved explosive reactive armor modules, upgraded information technology and information sharing with other combat vehicles, 360-degree vision system for the crew, updated fire control system with new generation thermal optics, and new photoelectric and sensor systems for improved battlefield awareness. Some versions are noted to be equipped with a remote-controlled weapon station (RCWS) for the commander and lacking the GL-6 hard kill APS launchers. Media reports in the South China Morning Post and the Hindustan Times indicated that the tank will primarily be deployed in the Himalayas, alongside the smaller Type-15.

== Operators ==
- China
  - People's Liberation Army Ground Force: 600 ZTZ-99, 700 ZTZ-99A, 100 ZTZ-99B

== Gallery ==
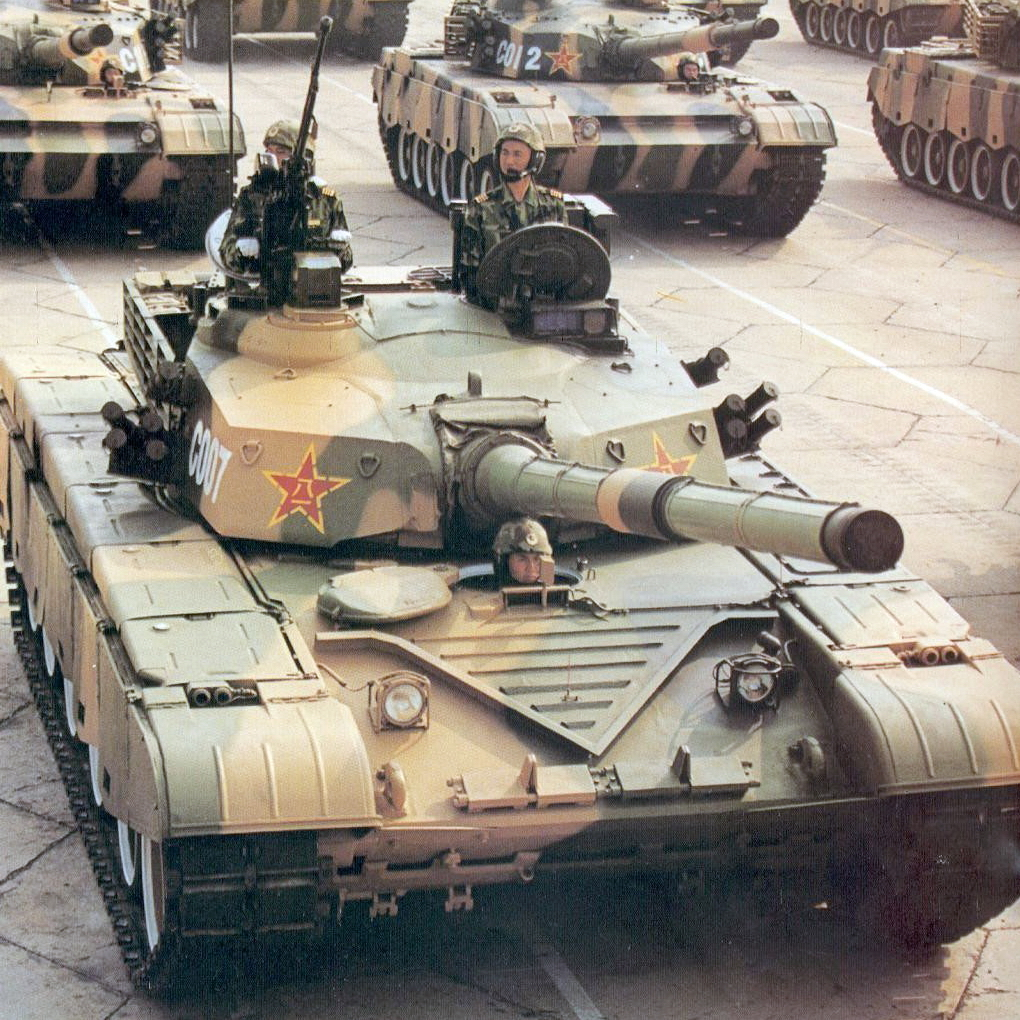
Type 98 tank prototype (9910 project) during the rehearsal of the 1999 National Day Military Parade.

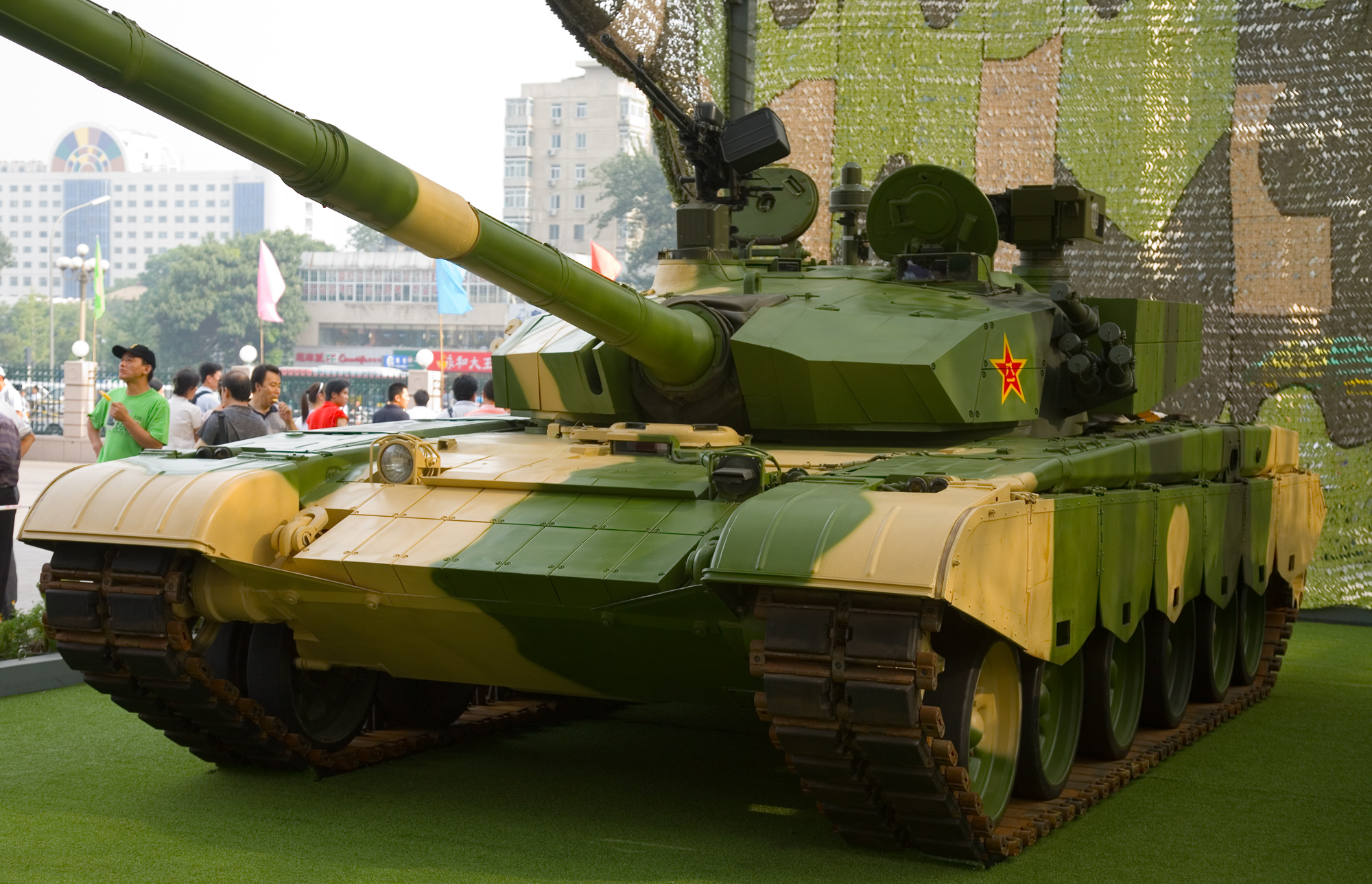
A Type 99 tank at the China People's Revolution Military Museum in Beijing during the 2007 Our troops towards the sun exhibition.

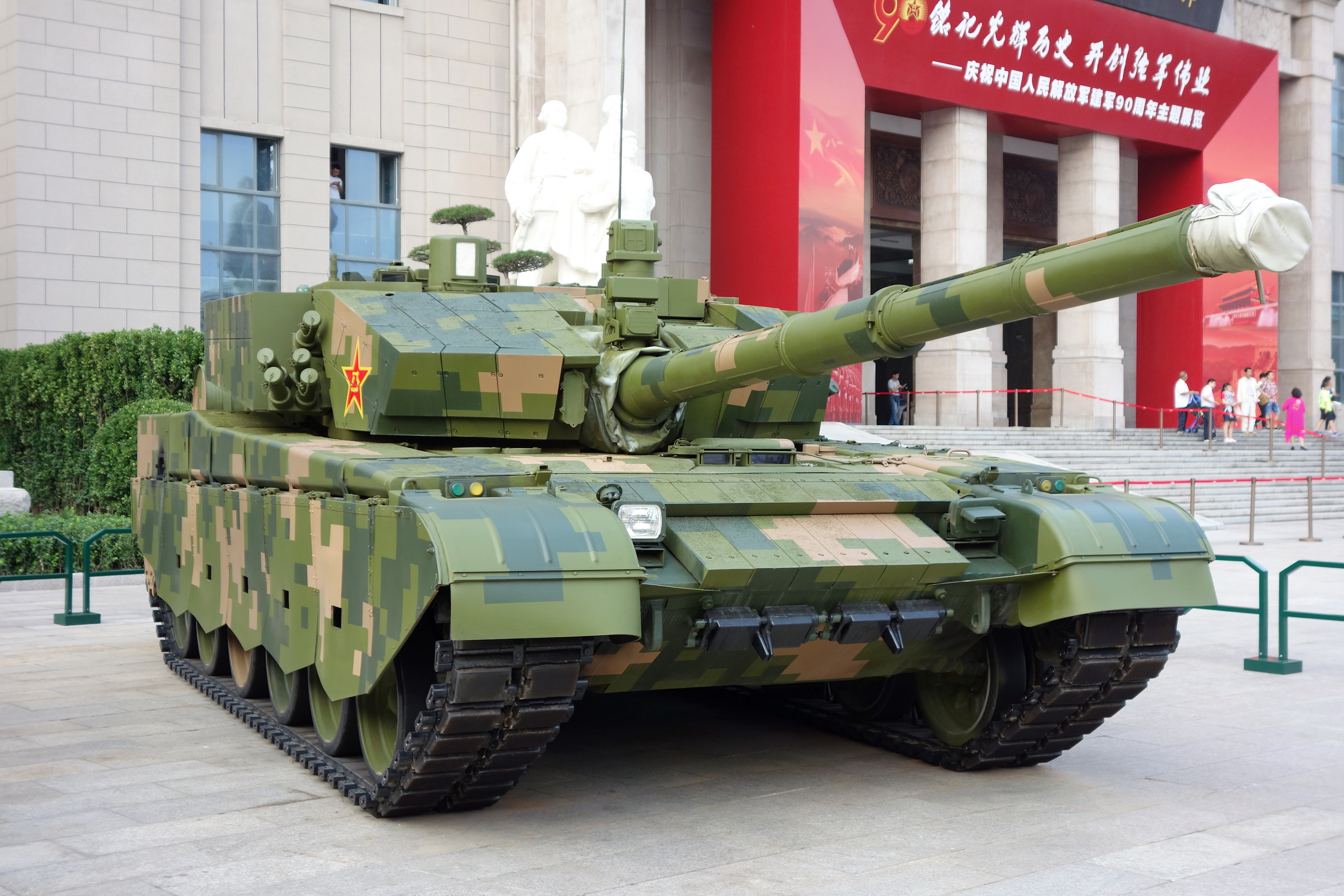
Type 99A tank at a Theme Exhibition of the 90th Anniversary of the Chinese People's Liberation Army.

== See also ==
- Type 100 — China's fourth-generation MBT
- Al-Khalid tank
- VT-4 — export MBT built by Norinco
- Type 96B — China's other third-generation MBT
- Type 15 — China's new third-generation light tank
- List of main battle tanks by generation
- M1 Abrams
- Arjun MBT

== Notes ==
Bibliography

- US Army TRADOC Intelligence Support Activity. Ground Systems. Worldwide Equipment Guide. Vol. 1 (2011 ed.).
