= Type 100 support vehicle =

Chinese combat vehicle

Type 100 Support Vehicle
- Type: Fire support vehicle
- Place of origin: China

Service history
- In service: Around 2025-present
- Used by: People's Liberation Army Ground Force

Production history
- Designer: 201st Research Institute
- Designed: No later than 2016 - 2022
- Manufacturer: Baotou Tank Plant
- Produced: Around 2025-present

Specifications
- Mass: reportedly 35+ tonnes
- Crew: at least 2 crew with at least 3 passengers
- Armor: Classified, 2 GL-6 APS; 2 launch tubes per APS
- Main armament: Reportedly 35mm or 30mm Autocannon
- Secondary armament: 1 QJY-201 coaxial machine gun, missile and loitering munitions system
- Engine: Hybrid power system 1500hp
- Suspension: Torsion bar suspension

The Type 100 Support Combat Vehicle (Chinese: 100式支援战车) is a Chinese fire support vehicle built on a shared chassis with Type 100 tank, currently in service of the People's Liberation Army Ground Force. The vehicle was first seen in public in mid-August 2025 during rehearsals for the then-upcoming Victory Day Parade to commemorate the 80th Anniversary of the end of the Second Sino-Japanese War and the Second World War, and officially debuted during the actual military parade in Tiananmen Square on September 3, 2025.

== Design ==
=== Armament ===
The Type 100 is armed with reportedly 35 mm or a new 30 mm autocannon (different from earlier 30 mm autocannons mounted on other PLA combat vehicles) within an unmanned turret. The Type 100 also features a coaxial QJY-201 7.62mm general-purpose machine gun. Like the Type 100 tank, it is equipped with phased array radars that allow the vehicle to detect and engage aerial targets such as drones, and the rear chassis features a launch platform for quadcopter drones and a vertical launch system capable of firing airburst rounds and loitering munitions. Additionally, the support vehicle is reported to have generally the same fire control system as the Type 100 tank.

=== Battlefield perception and defense ===
The Type 100 support vehicle is equipped with an array of several optical instruments that multiple directions to transmit battlefield images to the screen in the crew compartment in real time. These instruments can detect different bands of visible and invisible light to ensure combat capabilities remain effective in low-visibility or dark environments. These instruments are all broadly the same found on the tank variant. According to Wang Qun of the ground assault formation which participated in the 2025 China Victory Day Parade, at least one member of Type 100 support vehicle crew will serve as the drone operator, who can launch and control reconnaissance and attack drones to enhancing the Type 100's situation awareness and anti-tank capabilities on the battlefield.

The Type 100 support vehicle sports 2 GL-6 active protection systems, each with two launchers designed to release airburst interceptors that shoot down incoming suicide drones, anti-tank missiles and rocket-propelled grenades. The GL-6 also has a high angle of elevation, allowing it be able to shoot down top-attack munitions. The Type 100 is equipped with laser warning receivers and has received enhanced thermal vision sights. The Type 100 support vehicle also sports at least two phased array radars on the cheeks of the unmanned turret.

The Type 100 support vehicle has a crew of at least two and can be equipped with at least three additionally personnel, all are situated within a heavily armored compartment within the hull Like the crew of the Type 100 tank, the crew of a Type 100 makes use of wearable augmented reality devices that enhance their 360-degree field awareness. The Type 100 is also equipped with photoelectrical sensors and has numerous "intelligence driven systems" giving the Type 100 an "enhanced digital intelligence". The wearable augmented reality devices utilized by the crew can also allow crew members to take direct control of the Type 100's weapon systems, for instance if the gunner were to turn his or her head then the turret and or RWS would also turn in the same direction.

The Type 100 support vehicle also features a retractable phased array radar on top of the turret, this radar is similar to radar used in air defense systems and is expected to be used to help shoot down drones. The Type 100 support vehicle also is possible equipped a surveillance and anti-drone warfare electronic warfare suite.

=== Mobility ===
The Type 100 support vehicle is reported to be equipped with the same hybrid diesel-electric powertrain as the Type 100 tank. This new drivetrain is noted to be significantly lighter than previous generations of armored vehicle drivetrains. However, in contrast to the tank variant of the Type 100, the fire support vehicle mounts the engine and drive wheels in the front. The fire support vehicle is equipped with a range extender and is maybe equipped with an auxiliary power unit.

Wang Qun of the ground assault formation, which participated in the 2025 parade, stated that the hybrid electric drivetrain allows the Type 100 support vehicle to silently approach enemy targets without being exposed.

== See also ==
- Type 100 tank
