= Inner Mongolia First Machinery Group Corporation =

Military equipment manufacturer in China, part of Norinco Group

Inner Mongolia First Machinery Group Corporation (内蒙古第一机械集团有限公司, abbrev. 一机), previously First Inner Mongolia Machinery Factory, is a military manufacturing company in China. It is a facility in Inner Mongolia and supplier of various military equipment to the PLA Army. It has also been known as Factory 617 (六一七厂) and the Baotou Tank Plant.

== Products ==
- MBT-2000 main battle tank
- Type 100 tank
- Type 100 support vehicle
- Type 96 main battle tank
- Type 88 main battle tank
- Type 69/79 main battle tank
- Type 59 main battle tank
- Chinese firefighting tank
- BeiBen Truck Mercedes Benz licensed heavy trucks
- Train wagons
- Bulldozer
- Sucker rods
- Welding steel products
