= Type 100 tank =

Chinese main battle tank

Type 100
- Type: Main battle tank
- Place of origin: China

Service history
- In service: Around 2025–present
- Used by: People's Liberation Army Ground Force

Production history
- Designer: 201st Research Institute
- Designed: No later than 2016–2022
- Manufacturer: Baotou Tank Plant
- Produced: Around 2025–present

Specifications
- Mass: approximately 40 tonnes
- Crew: 3
- Armor: Classified, 2 GL-6 APS; 4 launch tubes per APS
- Main armament: 105 mm main gun
- Secondary armament: A 12.7mm machine gun on a remote weapons station, 1 coaxial QJY-201 machine gun,
- Engine: Hybrid power system 1,500 hp
- Suspension: Torsion bar suspension
- Maximum speed: Road:~80km/h Off-Road:~50km/h

The Type 100 tank (Chinese: ZTZ-100主战坦克) is a Chinese 4th-generation main battle tank. The tank was first officially seen in public in mid-August 2025 during rehearsals for the then upcoming Victory Day Parade to commemorate the 80th Anniversary of the end of the Second Sino-Japanese War and the Second World War, and officially debuted during the actual military parade in Tiananmen Square on 3 September 2025.

== Design ==
=== Armament ===
The Type 100 is armed with an autoloaded 105 mm (4.1 in) main gun within an unmanned turret. Due to advancements in propellant and kinetic delivery technologies, which allow APFSDS rounds to achieve a reported muzzle velocity of roughly 1,706 m/s (5,600 ft/s), the 105 mm gun is reported to be comparable to the larger 120 mm and 125 mm smoothbore guns in terms of general performance. The Type 100 also features a coaxial QJY-201 7.62mm general-purpose machine gun, and a remote weapons station (RWS) on top of the turret with a 12.7 mm heavy machine gun, which has optical and thermal imaging systems for air defence against drones.

=== Battlefield perception and defense ===
The Type 100 is equipped with several optical instruments in multiple directions to transmit battlefield images to the screen in the crew compartment in real time. These instruments can detect different bands of visible and invisible light to ensure combat capabilities remain effective in low-visibility or dark environments. In addition, the Type 100's crew may be able to command and organize other types of unmanned vehicles such as drones.

The Type 100 has four diagonal phased array radars, which while serving as the targeting system of the two GL-6 active protection system (APS) systems mounted atop the turret, also seems to be integrated into the crew's observation systems, and may also serve as an emergency electronic warfare system. Each of the two GL-6 APS system is equipped with four launchers, and the charges in these launchers are designed to release projectiles that shoot down incoming suicide drones, anti-tank missiles and RPG rockets. The GL-6 also has a high angle of elevation, allowing it be able to shoot down top-attack munitions. The Type 100 is equipped with laser warning receivers, optical and UV detection and warning arrays as well as enhanced thermal vision sights. The multi-faceted protrusions present on the tank are positioned in such a way that enemy vehicles have a greater difficulty hitting the tank.

The Type 100 has a three-men crew, who are situated within a heavily armored cabin and in the event of a catastrophic build up of gas, vents primarily on the unmanned turret – which cannot be opened from the outside – will open and release the gas. The crew of a Type 100 makes use of wearable augmented reality devices that enhance their 360-degree field awareness. The Type 100 is also equipped with photoelectrical sensors and has numerous "intelligence driven systems" giving the Type 100 an "enhanced digital intelligence". The wearable augmented reality devices used by the crew can also allow crew members to take direct control of the Type 100's weapon systems, for instance, if the gunner were to turn their head, then the turret and/or RWS would also turn in the same direction.

The design of the Type 100 reflects China's broader goal of developing integrated, intelligentized warfare capabilities, in which manned and unmanned systems share real-time data to enhance situational awareness and combat effectiveness.

=== Mobility ===
The Type 100 tank is equipped with a hybrid diesel-electric powertrain that is capable of generating 1,500 hp (1,100 kW) of engine power and allowing an on-road top speed of ~80 km/h (50 mph) and an off-road top speed of ~50 km/h (31 mph), as well as being significantly lighter than previous generations of tank drivetrains.

Major Chen Bo of PLAGF, who personally operated one of the tanks during the 2025 China Victory Day Parade, commented that the tank is able to "silently stand on guard" or approach the enemy silently in certain circumstances, launching "silent and surprised attacks" and avoiding exposing themselves, suggesting the vehicle may be able to be operated in full-electric mode without starting its diesel engine. The Type 100's hybrid drivetrain has a lower infrared signature and noise profile as well as a featuring a range extender.

== Variants ==
=== Type 100 support vehicle ===
Fire support vehicle based on the same chassis.
