= List of armoured fighting vehicles by country =

This is a list of armoured fighting vehicles, sorted by country of origin. The information in round brackets ( ) indicates the number of AFVs produced and the period of use. Prototypes are marked as such.

In the case of multi-national projects, the vehicle may be listed under all applicable countries.

== Albania ==
Armoured fighting vehicles produced in Albania

- Shota

== Algeria ==
Armoured fighting vehicles produced in Algeria

- BCL-M5

== Argentina ==
Armoured fighting vehicles produced in Argentina

=== Tanks ===
- Nahuel medium tank (World War II era)
- TAM Main Battle Tank (modern)
- Patagón Light tank (modern)

=== Infantry fighting vehicles ===
- VCTP armoured personnel carrier (modern)

=== Self-propelled artillery ===
- TAM VCA 155 mm self-propelled gun, "Palmaria" turret (modern)
- VCTM 120 mm mortar carrier (modern)

== Australia ==
Armoured fighting vehicles produced in Australia

- 2-pounder anti-tank gun carrier (200, World War II)
- 3 inch mortar carrier (400, World War II)
- Dingo scout car (245, World War II)
- Rover light armoured car (238, World War II)
- Sentinel cruiser tank (65, World War II)
- AC3 Thunderbolt cruiser tank (prototype, World War II)
- Universal Carrier (license production, World War II)
- Yeramba self-propelled gun (14, post-World War II)
- ASLAV infantry fighting vehicle (257, modern)
- Bushmaster Protected Mobility Vehicle (1130, modern)
- Boxer Combat Reconnaissance Vehicle (186, modern)
- AS21 Redback infantry fighting vehicle (129, modern)

=== Armoured cars ===
- Rhino heavy armoured car (prototype, World War II)
- Rover light armoured car (238, World War II)
- S1 scout car (40, World War II)
- Hawkei protected mobility vehicle, light (1100, modern)

=== Self-propelled artillery ===
- AS9 Huntsman self-propelled howitzer (28, modern)
- AS10 AARV Armoured Ammunition Resupply Vehicle (14, modern)

== Austria ==
Armoured fighting vehicles produced in Austria

- SPz Ulan (modern, co-development with Spain)
- Steyr 4K 7FA tracked armoured personnel carrier/infantry fighting vehicle (production from 1977 for Bolivia, Greece (as Leonidas) and Nigeria).
- Saurer 4K 4FA tracked armoured personnel carrier (~450 built for Austria 1958–1969).
- Pandur I 6x6 armoured personnel carrier
- Pandur II 8x8 armoured personnel carrier
- SK-105 Kürassier light tank (modern)

=== Armoured cars ===
- Junovicz armoured car – World War I design
- Steyr ADGZ – interwar design

== Azerbaijan ==
Armoured fighting vehicles produced in Azerbaijan

- Matador (mine protected vehicle)
- Marauder (vehicle)
- Ildirim MRAP
- Tufan MRAP

=== Armoured cars ===
- Gurza Patrol Vehicle

== Bangladesh ==
Armoured fighting vehicles produced in Bangladesh

- Type 59 Durjoy (modern) highly modernized version of the Chinese Type 59 tank for the Bangladesh Army

== Belgium ==
Armoured fighting vehicles produced in Belgium

- T15 (World War II)
- T-13 tank destroyer (World War II)
- ACG-1 (World War II)
- Models B1, B2, and B3 (World War II)
- ACEC Cobra Tracked armoured personnel carrier with diesel electric drive. Five prototypes built by 1985. Cobra Armoured Fighting Vehicle (i.e. light tank) variant built 1987.
- Cockerill SIBMAS Wheeled armoured personnel carrier family. Operated by Malaysia from 1983.
- Sabiex Iguana (modern)

=== Armoured cars ===
- Automitrailleuse Minerva – World War I design
- FN 4RM/62F AB – 4×4 armoured car. Sixty two built for Belgian Gendarmerie 1971–1972 in 90 mm gun and 60 mm motor variants.
- Cockerill i-X

== Brazil ==
Armoured fighting vehicles produced in Brazil

=== Armoured personnel carrier ===
- Charrua XMP-1 – tracked amphibious armoured personnel carrier. Prototype built 1984.
- EE-3 Jararaca
- EE-9 Cascavel
- EE-11 Urutu
- VBTP-MR

=== Infantry fighting vehicles ===
- EE-T4 Ogum – light tracked reconnaissance vehicle.

=== Main battle tank ===
- EE-T1 Osório main battle tank (modern)
- Bernardini MB-3 Tamoyo main battle tank (development of M41 Walker Bulldog).
- Bernardini X1A – rebuild of M3 Stuart light tank with new armour, engine, suspension and 90 mm gun.
- Bernadini X1A2 – new build derivative of X1A tank. At least 30 built 1979–1983 for Brazilian Army.

=== Self-propelled artillery ===
- Astros II MLRS Multiple rocket launcher.

=== 4x4 armoured car ===
- GUARÁ Avibrás 4x4 light armoured car.
- VBL (inbrafiltro) 4x4 light armoured car.
- AV-VU4 AM medium 4X4 armoured car.
- AV-VBL heavy 4x4 armoured car.

=== Others ===
- EE-17_Sucuri

== Bulgaria ==
Armoured fighting vehicles produced in Bulgaria

- BTR-60 (APC, modern)
- BMP-1 (IFV, modern)
- MT-LB (APC, modern)
- BMP-23 (IFV, modern)
- T-72M2 (tank, modern)
- 2S1 Gvozdika (self-propelled artillery, modern)

== Burkina Faso ==
Armoured fighting vehicles produced in Burkina Faso

- Nanga Armored car

== Canada ==
Armoured fighting vehicles produced in Canada

=== Tanks ===
- Ram cruiser tank (World War II era)
- Grizzly Canadian-built M4 Sherman tank (World War II)

=== Armoured fighting vehicles ===
- Kangaroo – World War II era conversions of armoured vehicles to armoured personnel carriers
- Bobcat APC – Cold War prototype. The project was cancelled.
- Bison APC – a light armoured vehicle based on the MOWAG Piranha II
- AVGP (Cougar, Grizzly and Husky) – based on the six-wheeled version of the Mowag Piranha I.
- Coyote Reconnaissance Vehicle – based on the Mowag Piranha II
- LAV III – a light armoured vehicle based on the Mowag Piranha III
- LAV 6 – an upgraded version of the LAV III
- Fox armoured car – Canadian version of Humber armoured car
- Otter light reconnaissance car – World War II 4x4 armoured car.

=== Self-propelled artillery ===
- Sexton – World War II self-propelled 25-pounder gun.
- Skink – Prototype anti-aircraft tank. (World War II)
- Air defense anti-tank system (ADATS) – Cold War/modern
- Multi-Mission Effects Vehicle (MMEV) – Prototype. Project canceled. Modern project.

=== Armoured cars ===
- Armoured Autocar – World War I mobile machine gun nest
- INKAS Sentry APC
- C15TA Armoured Truck – World War II armoured load carrier
- Lynx scout car – Canadian version of Daimler Dingo.

== Colombia ==
Armoured fighting vehicles produced in Colombia

- Zipa – Colombian version of the EE-11 Urutu
- BTR-80 Caribe – Colombian version of Russian BTR-80
- Hunter TR-12 – MRAP
- Hunter XL – MRAP
- ISBI Meteoro – MRAP

== Chile ==
Armoured fighting vehicles produced in Chile

- BMS-1 (prototype with components of M3 Halftrack)
- VTP-1 (prototype with components of BMS-1)
- VTP-2 (prototype with components of Mercedes Benz Unimog)
- Carancho
- Mowag Piranha
- HUMVEE

== China ==
Armoured fighting vehicles produced in the People's Republic of China

=== Tanks ===
- Type 58 medium tank (Chinese-produced T-34)
- Type 59 main battle tank (copy of Soviet T-54A Tank)
- Type 59-I
- Type 59-II
- Type 59-IIA
- Type 59-IIA command tank
- Type 59-IIA mine-sweeper tank
- Type 59 Gai (test platform for Western technologies), also known as Type 59G / VT-3 main battle tank
- Type 59D
- Type 59-16 light tank prototype
- Type 62 light tank
- Type 62-I
- Type 62G
- Type 63 amphibious light tank
- Type 63A
- Type 69 main battle tank prototype
- Type 69-I prototype, incorporating some technologies from captured Soviet T-62
- Type 69-II (A) main battle tank (First production version released in 1982.)
- Type 69-II-B/C command tank
- Type 79, also known as Type 69 III
- Type 80 main battle tank
- Type 85 main battle tank
- Type 88 main battle tank
- Type 90 / VT-1 (Type 90-IIM), exported as MBT-2000 / VT-4 as MBT-3000
- Type 96 / VT-2 (Type 96A) main battle tank
- Type 98 prototype main battle tank
- Type 99 main battle tank
- Type 15 light tank
- VT-5 light tank

=== Armoured personnel carriers ===
- Type 63 aka YW-531 armoured personnel carrier (Cold War)
- Type 77 amphibious armoured personnel carrier (Cold War)
- WZ-523 – six-wheeled APC. Developed into ZFB91 internal security vehicle used by Peoples Liberation Army.
- Type 85 aka YW-531H, improved T-63 APC (Cold War)
- Type 89 aka YW-534, improved Type 85 APC (Cold War)

=== Infantry fighting vehicles ===
- Type 86 aka WZ-501, copy of Soviet BMP-1 (Cold War)
- Type 92 aka WZ-551 wheeled IFV (modern)
- Type 03 aka ZBD-03 or WZ-506 wheeled IFV (modern), Chinese airborne infantry fighting vehicle. Early prototypes received the designation ZLC-2000.
- Type 04 aka WZ-502 tracked IFV (modern)
- Type 05 amphibious IFV.
- Type 08 wheeled armored vehicle
- Type 11 /ST-1 Assault Gun

== Croatia ==
Armoured fighting vehicles produced in Croatia

- M-84D MBT
- M-95 Degman MBT
- LOV-1

== Cyprus ==
Armoured fighting vehicles produced in Cyprus

=== Armoured cars ===
- TS (10 examples produced from Soviet supplied ATS-712 prime movers)

== Czechoslovakia ==
Armoured fighting vehicles produced in Czechoslovakia

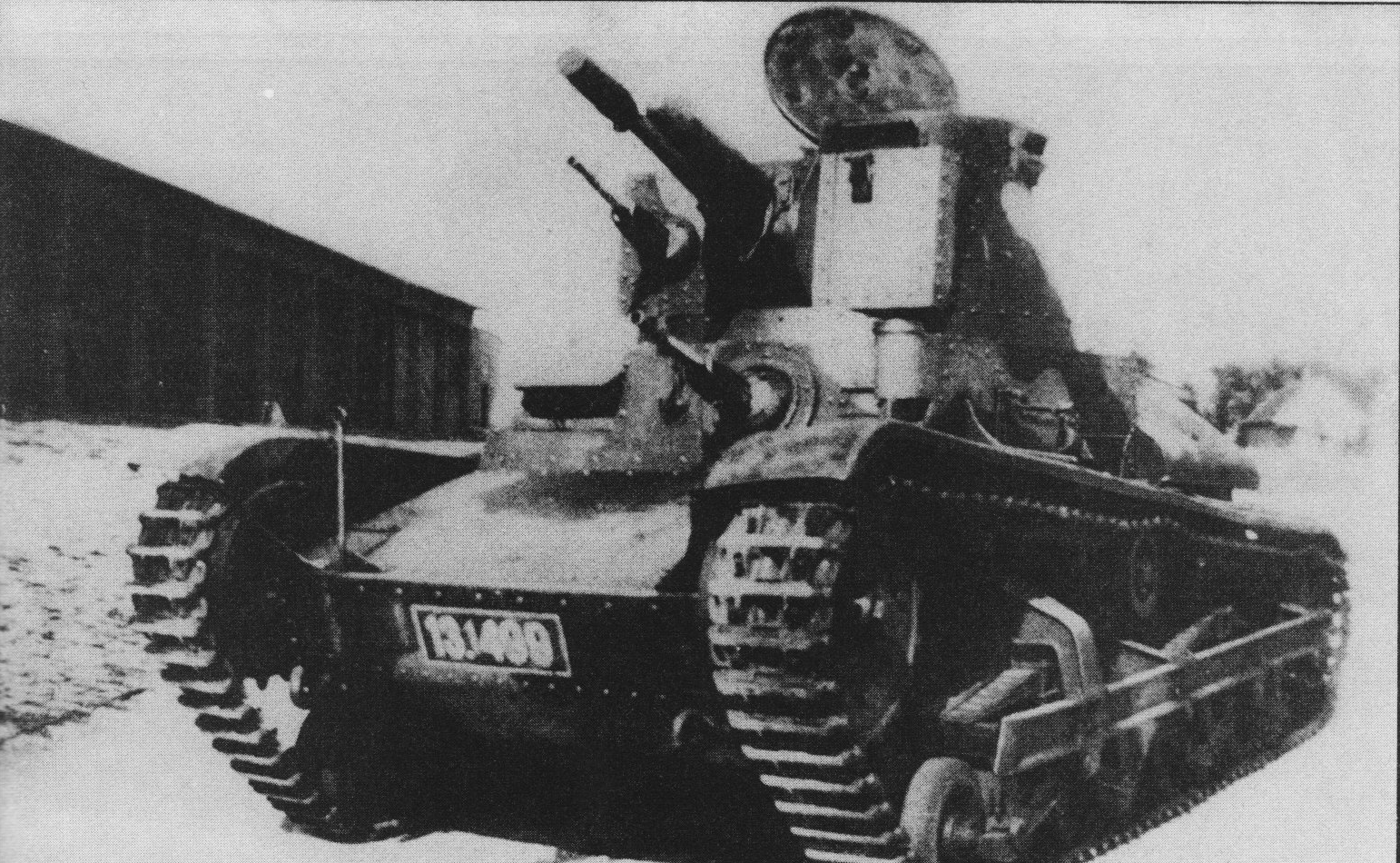
A picture of the LT vz. 34

=== Tanks ===
- LT vz. 34 – CKD/Praga P-11 light tank. Fifty built for Czechoslovakia.
- LT vz. 35 – Škoda S-IIa light tank built for Czechoslovak army. Captured examples used by Germany as Panzer 35(t).
- LT vz. 38 – CKD/Praga TNH light tank built for Czechoslovakia and export. Adopted by German army as Panzer 38(t) and continued in production until 1942.
- AH-IV – Two man light tank built for export.
- F-IV-HE – 1937 prototype three-man amphibious light tank.
- Škoda S-IIb – Medium tank design rejected by Czechoslovakia in favour of ST vz. 39, but developed into 40M Turán I for Hungary.
- ST vz. 39 – Prototype medium tank design by CKD/Praga. Ordered by Czechoslovak army but production plans stopped by German takeover.

=== Tankettes ===
- Tančík vz. 33 – CKD/Praga two man tankette design – about 70 ordered by Czechoslovakia.
- Škoda S-1 – Two man tankette, rejected in favour of the vz. 33 by Czechoslovakia, but S-1d version armed with 47 mm gun built for Yugoslavia.

=== Armoured cars ===
- OA vz. 27 – interwar design
- OA vz. 30 – interwar 6 wheel design

== Egypt ==
Armoured fighting vehicles produced in Egypt

=== Tanks ===
- Ramses-II main battle tank
- M1A1 Abrams (1,005) locally assembled

=== Infantry fighting vehicles ===
- EIFV (Egyptian AIFV variant of the M113, locally built)
- Fahd 280-30
- Temsah (armoured personnel carrier) (Fully produced in the domestic factories of the Egyptian army)

=== Armoured personnel carriers ===
- Fahd 240/280 – 4X4 IFV.
- Tiger Kader-120 4X4 APC

=== Multiple rocket launcher ===
- RAAD 200

=== Scout and reconnaissance ===
- Kader-320 4X4 light armoured reconnaissance

== Estonia ==
Armoured fighting vehicles produced in Estonia

- Arsenal Crossley armoured car

== Finland ==
Armoured fighting vehicles produced in Finland

- Sisu Pasi
- Sisu Nasu
- Patria AMV (Armoured Modular Vehicle) 8x8 Wheeled Vehicle
- BT-42 Assault Gun (18, World War II)

== France ==
Armoured fighting vehicles produced in France

- AMC 34 (Auto-mitrailleuse de Combat Renault, modèle 1934) – Three-man light tank for French cavalry. Company designation Renault YR.
- AMC 35 – Improved 3-man cavalry tank that replaced AMC 34 in production. Renault ACGI.
- AMR 33 (Auto-mitrailleuse de Reconnaissance Renault, modèle 1934) – Two-man light reconnaissance tank for French cavalry. Renault Type VM.
- AMR 35 (Auto-mitrailleuse de Reconnaissance Renault, modèle 1935) – Improved two man tank for cavalry. Renault Type ZT.
- AMX 10 RC
- AMX 10P
- AMX 13
- AMX 30
- AMX-40
- ARL 44
- Char 2C heavy tank (10; World War I)
- Char B1
- Char NC1 – Improved 1927 derivative of the FT with thicker armour and new suspension. Sold to Japan and Yugoslavia.
- Char NC2 – Improved 1931 derivative of Char NC1. Sold to Greece.
- Citroën AMC P28
- FCM 36 – Two-man diesel-powered infantry support tank. 100 built.
- Hotchkiss H35 – Two-man light tank used by French cavalry and infantry.
- Leclerc
- Panhard 178
- Panhard AML
- Panhard EBR
- Panhard ERC
- Panhard M3
- Panhard VCR
- Panhard VTT
- Renault FT light tank (3694+; World War I)
- Renault R35 – Two-man infantry support tank. Approximately 2000 built. Renault Type ZM.
- Renault R40 – Improved version of R35.
- Saint-Chamond heavy tank (400; World War I)
- Schneider CA1 medium tank (400; World War I)
- Schneider AMC P16 (AMC - automitrailleuse de cavalerie) cavalry half-track
- Somua S-35
- VAB
- Vextra
- VXB

=== Armoured cars ===
- AMX 10 RC
- Berliet VPDM – interwar 6x4 armoured car.
- Berliet VUC – interwar four wheel design
- Berliet VUDB – interwar four wheel design
- Berliet VUM – interwar four wheel design
- Charron armoured car – pre-World War I vehicle.
- ERC 90 Sagaie
- Laffly 50AM – interwar four wheel design.
- Laffly 80AM – interwar four wheel design.
- Laffly S15 TOE – World War II six wheel design.
- Laffly W15 TCC – World War II six wheel design.
- Panhard 165/175 – interwar four wheel design
- Panhard 178
- Panhard AM40-P – interwar experimental eight wheel design
- Panhard AML- 4x4 with 90 mm main armament
- Panhard VBL Véhicule Blindé Léger – a modern French scout car designed for reconnaissance
- VBC-90
- Vextra 105 – a modern 8x8 design.
- White-Laffly AMD – World War I armoured car.

== Georgia ==
Armoured fighting vehicles produced in Georgia

=== Fast attack vehicles ===
- DELGA-1 series

=== Armoured personnel carriers ===
- Didgori-1
- Didgori-2
  - Command / Communications vehicle
  - MedEvac
- Didgori-3

=== Infantry fighting vehicle ===
- Lazika

=== Self-propelled artillery ===
- RS-122

== Germany ==
Armoured fighting vehicles produced in Germany

=== Tanks ===
- A7V heavy tank (22; World War I)
- A7VU heavy tank. Prototype World War I heavy tank, with similar layout (all-round tracks and armament mounted in sponsons) to British tanks. One completed.
- E-Series prototypes
- Sturmpanzerwagen Oberschlesien tank
- K Panzerkampfwagen super-heavy tank (2 incomplete; World War I)
- Grosstraktor heavy tank – prototypes built by Daimler-Benz, Rheinmetall and Krupp in 1929s.
- LK I light tank
- LK II light tank
- Leichttraktor light tank
- Panther
- Panther II prototype
- PzKpfw. I Ausf. A Light tank
- Flammenwerfer auf PzKpfw. I Ausf. A flame-thrower tank
- Kleiner Panzerbefehlswagen command tank (190)
- PzKpfw I Ausf. B light tank
- Flammenwerfer auf PzKpfw. I Ausf. B flame-thrower tank
- Panzer II light tank
- Panzer III medium tank
- Panzer IV medium tank
- Leopard 1
- Leopard 2
- Jaguar 1
- Jaguar 2
- TH200
- Maus superheavy tank prototype (2 completed, 9 halted in production)
- Tiger I
- Tiger II
- Wiesel 1 (and 2)
- KJPz HS-30 tank destroyer (KanoneJagdPanzer)
- MBT-70 prototype

=== Armoured/infantry fighting vehicles ===
- Sd.Kfz. 250 WWII reconnaissance fighting vehicle
- Sd.Kfz. 251 WWII infantry half-track
- Schützenpanzer Lang HS.30 Cold War infantry combat vehicle
- Schützenpanzer SPz 11-2 Kurz Cold War tracked reconnaissance vehicle
- Marder 1 A3 Cold War infantry combat vehicle
- Marder 1 A5 Cold War infantry combat vehicle
- Boxer (Armoured Fighting Vehicle), with the Netherlands and United Kingdom (modern)
- Puma (IFV) Modern infantry combat vehicle

=== Self-propelled artillery ===
- PzH 2000

=== Armoured cars ===
- Bussing A5P – experimental World War I 4x4 armoured car
- Daimler DZVR 21 / Sd.Kfz. 3 – interwar 4 wheel armoured car
- Ehrhardt E-V/4 – World War I vehicle
- Kfz 13 – interwar 4 wheel light armoured car
- Leichter Panzerspähwagen – a series of light 4x4 armoured cars from Nazi Germany
- Schwerer Panzerspähwagen – a family of 6x6 and 8x8 heavy armoured cars deployed by Nazi Germany
- Steyr ADGZ – ex-Austrian 8x8, more ordered by Waffen-SS units
- Spähpanzer Luchs – modern 8x8 vehicle
- AGF (light infantry vehicle) – 4x4 vehicle, used by the special forces (KSK)
- Fennek – 4x4 reconnaissance vehicle
- LAPV Enok – 4x4 patrol vehicle

== Ghana ==
- Kantanka-ABV, Armored Bullion Vehicle, slated for use as police SUV (Bullet Proof Glass and Armor Plating, based on Kantanka Onantefo)
- Kantanka-KTK Car, 4-Wheeled Light Weapons Platform - Crewless Drone Vehicle
- Kantanka-ACCRA APC, 8-Wheeled Fighting Armoured Personnel Carrier, (4 metres tall/13 feet), 4 crew, 20 passengers
- Kantanka-GLITZ Walker, Bipedal Mechanized "Chicken Walker"
- Kantanka-Infantry Exoskeleton, Passively Powered via "Gear weight and Hydraulics" (Claimed).
- Kantanka Okofuo - armored car
- Kantanka Okofo - armored truck

=== Self-propelled Artillery ===
- Kantanka-SPG, 4-Wheeled Fighting Artillery, - 3 crew/3 passengers, Main gun and side mounted rocket tubes

== Greece ==
Armoured fighting vehicles produced in Greece

=== Tanks ===
- ELVO Leopard 2 Hel MBT (170)

=== Infantry carriers ===
- ELVO Leonidas-1 (copy of the Steyr 4K 7FA)
- ELVO Leonidas-2 APC
- ELVO Kentaurus AIFV

=== Wheeled armoured vehicles ===
- Peerless-Vickers Armored Car (Modification/Improvement in Greece) (Pre-WWII)
- Namco Tiger Armored Vehicle (proposed)
- EODH Hoplite

== Hungary ==
Armoured fighting vehicles produced in Hungary

=== Tanks ===
- Toldi – light tank (World War II)
- 40M Turán I – medium tank (World War II)
- 44M Tas – prototype medium tank (World War II)
- Straussler V–4 – interwar prototype amphibious high-speed light tank

=== Armoured cars ===
- Romfell – World War I design
- 39M Csaba – (World War II)
- Rába VP – (interwar era)
- Crossley Páncélgépkocsi – (interwar recon cars based on imported Crossley BGV trucks)
- Alvis Straussler AC3 produced for Alvis-Straussler Ltd. in WM Budapest

=== Armored personnel carriers ===
- D-442 FUG – Similar to, but not based on BRDM-1, carrier for reconnaissance teams
- PSZH-IV – Similar to, but not based on BRDM-2, carrier for motorized infantry
- Lynx IFV production under a German license after 2023
- H18.240 DAEZ MRAP truck based on Rába H18 series 6x6 8ton truck

=== Self-propelled artillery ===
- 43M Zrínyi – SP gun (World War II)
- 40M Nimród – AA tank (World War II) the first mass-produced SPAA

== India ==
Armoured fighting vehicles produced in India

=== Main battle tanks ===
- Arjun Mk 1 – main battle tank
- Arjun Mk 1A – main battle tank
- Arjun Mk 2 – 4th generation main battle tank
- T-90S – license produced/assembled main battle tank
- T-72M1 – license produced/assembled main battle tank
- Tank EX – main battle tank
- Vijayanta – Cold War era main battle tank, derived from Vickers MBT

=== Light tanks ===
- Zorawar LT - Produced by L&T pvt.ltd as an modern Light tank

=== Infantry fighting vehicles ===
- Abhay IFV – infantry combat vehicle
- BMP-1 -Carrier Mortar Tracked license produced/assembled infantry combat vehicle
- BMP-2 – license produced/assembled infantry Combat Vehicle
- DRDO light tank – Cold war era infantry fighting vehicle
- TATA FICV – Infantry Fighting Vehicle and Engineers Fighting Vehicle
- Mahindra FICV – Infantry fighting vehicle And engineers fighting vehicle

=== Armoured personnel carrier ===
- Carrier Mortar Tracked – self-propelled mortar
- DRDO Armoured Engineer Reconnaissance Vehicle – Engineer fighting vehicle and armoured reconnaissance vehicle
- TATA Kestrel – Wheeled 8 x 8 armoured personnel carrier and amphibious armoured carrier
- VRDE light armoured vehicle – Wheeled 8 x 8 armoured personnel carrier and armoured reconnaissance carrier co-developed with Canadian General Dynamics Land Systems and Swiss Mowag
- Kartik BLT – Armoured bridge launching vehicle

=== Armoured cars ===
- Armoured Carrier Wheeled Indian Pattern – World War II 4 x 4 armoured cars
- Land Rover 1515F – 4 x 4 Armoured vehicle
- Mahindra Rakshak – 4 x 4 Armoured vehicle
- Mahindra Striker – 4 x 4 light armoured vehicle
- Mahindra Marksman – 4 x 4 Armoured vehicle
- Mahindra Axe – 4 x 4 light armoured vehicle
- Mahindra Mine Protected Vehicle – 6 x 6 Armoured personnel carrier
- Mahindra Armored Light Specialist Vehicle - 4 x 4 specialist light-armoured vehicle
- TATA LSV – 4 x 4 Armoured vehicle
- TATA LAMV – 4 x 4 Armoured vehicle
- TATA Mine Protected Vehicle – 6 x 6 Armoured personnel carrier
- OFB MPV 1 – 6 x 6 Armoured personnel carrier
- OFB MPV 2 – 6 x 6 Armoured personnel carrier
- EME 515 Windy & Tuffy & Takshak & Gypsy

=== Self-propelled howitzers ===
- HT-130 Catapult – 130 mm self-propelled artillery based on the Vijayanta MBT hull
- Bhim self-propelled howitzer – 155 mm self-propelled howitzer
- OFB 105mm SPG – 105 mm Self Propelled Howitzer based on BMP-2
- L & T self-propelled howitzer – 155 mm self-propelled howitzer based on Korean K9 Thunder
- Kalyani self-propelled howitzer – 155 mm self-propelled howitzer based on Arjun Mk 2 chassis
- Tata self-propelled howitzer – 155 mm self-propelled howitzer based on Arjun Mk 2 chassis

== Indonesia ==
Armoured fighting vehicles produced in Indonesia

=== Tank ===
- Harimau Gen 2 — Pindad made Main battle tank (120mm)
- Harimau Gen 1 — Pindad and FNSS made Medium tank (105mm)
- AMX-13/105 Retrofit — Retrofitted by Pindad
- SBS Light Tank — Pindad made Light Tank with 90mm cannon and SBS chassis

=== Armored Vehicles ===
- Pindad A.yani (APC)
- Pindad U.yani (APC)
- Pindad APR-1V (APC)
- Pindad APS-1 (APC)
- Pindad APS-2 (APC)
- Pindad APS-3 Anoa (APC)
- Pindad Komodo (Armored Car)
- Pindad Sanca (MRAP)
- Pindad Elang (Light Tactical Vehicle)
- P2 (armoured vehicle) (Armored Car)
- Harimau APC (APC)
- DMV-30 T/A (Light Armored Vehicle)
- TAD Turangga (APC, Infantry Mobility Vehicle)
- SSE P1 PAKCI
- Anoa 2 6x6 Amphibious (Amphibious APC)
- RAD Fortes MV 6.0 (APC)
- RAD Magna 4x4 (Armored Car)
- Arwana 4x4 Armored Personnel Carrier (APC)
- Overvalwagen (APC)

=== Infantry Fighting Vehicle ===
- Pindad Cobra
- Anoa Panser IFV 6×6 Canon 20 mm

=== Military Utility Vehicle ===
- Pindad Maung
- Pindad MV2
- Indonesian Light Strike Vehicle
- P6 ATAV
- ILSV-RTV (ATV Rubber Wheeled Vehicle)

=== Fire Support Vehicles ===
- Pindad Badak (Wheeled FSV)

=== Self-propelled Artillery ===
- Pindad SBS 6x6 MLRS
- DS-240 Arjuna MLRS

=== Miscellaneous Military Vehicles ===
- Badak 6x6 SPAAG
- Anoa 2 6x6 Mortar Carrier
- Anoa 2 6x6 Armored Recovery Vehicle
- Anoa 2 6x6 Ammunition Carrier
- Anoa 2 6x6 Command
- Anoa 2 6x6 Ambulance
- Ganilla 2.0 Kitchen Truck (Military Kitchen Truck)

== Iran ==
Armoured fighting vehicles produced in Iran

=== Tanks ===
- Karrar MBT
- Zulfiqar 1 MBT
- Zulfiqar 2 MBT (Prototype)
- Zulfiqar 3 MBT
- Type 72Z Medium tank
- Tiam Medium tank
- T-72M Rakhsh T-72M variant developed by the IRGC with new ERA, sights, an RWS. and many other upgrades.
- T-72S MBT (under license)
- Tosan light tank

=== Tank destroyers ===
- Aqareb Wheeled 8x8 Tank Destroyer
- Pirooz on ARAS 4x4

=== Infantry fighting vehicles ===
- Makran IFV
- Cobra BMT-2 Boragh with either a 30mm Shipunov 2A42 auto-cannon or a ZU-23-2
- BMP-1 APC (under license)
- BMP-2 APC (under license)

=== Armoured personnel carriers ===
- Sayyad AFV
- Boragh APC
- Rakhsh 4x4 APC
- Sarir 4x4 APC
- Hoveyzeh Tracked light vehicle
- BPR-82 Sedad 23 mm BTR-60PB with an unmanned ZU-23-2.
- Heidar-6 BTR-60PB with a 2A28 Grom and a new engine.
- Heidar-7 BTR-60PB with unmanned 23mm turret, ERA, and a new engine.

=== Infantry mobility vehicles ===
- Toofan 4x4 IMV
- Ra'ad 6x6 IMV
- Roueintan 4x4 IMV
- Fateq 4x4 IMV

=== Self-propelled artillery ===
- Raad-1 self-propelled artillery
- Raad-2 self-propelled artillery
- Heidar-41 122 mm truck-based self-propelled artillery
- HM-41 truck-based automatic loading version

== Iraq ==
Armoured fighting vehicles produced in Iraq

=== Tank ===
- T-72M1 "Lion of Babylon" (Asad Babil)
- T-72M1 "Saddam"
- T-55 Al Kafil-1
- T-55 Enigma (Al-Faw)
- Type 69-II Enigma

=== Infantry Fighting Vehicle ===
- BMP-1 "Saddam-II"

=== Armored Fighting Vehicle ===
- MT-LBV (with wider tracks version)
- Hajjam 1 (Armored Car)
- Iraqi Light Armored Vehicle (MRAP)

=== Self-propelled Artillery ===
- Al-Fao (Wheeled Self-propelled Artillery)
- ASTROS II "Sajil-40" (MLRS)
- ASTROS II "Sajil-60" (MLRS)

=== Miscellaneous Military Vehicles ===
- MT-LB ZU-23-2 (SPAAG)

== Ireland ==
Armoured vehicles produced in Ireland

=== Armoured cars ===
- Leyland armoured car (4)
- Morris Mk IV armoured car (1)
- Ford Mk V armoured car (14)
- Ford Mk VI armoured car (28)
- Dodge armoured car (5)
- Timoney armoured personnel carrier (14)

== Israel ==
Armoured fighting vehicles produced in Israel

- Super Sherman
- Merkava tank
- Magach
- Sabra
- Achzarit
- Zelda
- Ro'em or L-33
- Puma combat engineering vehicle
- Nagmashot
- Nagmachon
- Nakpadon
- Namer

=== Armoured cars ===
- Golan Armored Vehicle
- RAM (light combat vehicle) – 4x4 multi-purpose armoured vehicle.
- Plasan Sand Cat
- AIL Storm
- WOLF

== Italy ==
Armoured fighting vehicles produced in Italy

- Fiat M11/39
- Fiat M13/40
- Fiat M14/41
- M15/42 tank
- Fiat M16/43
- Carro Armato P 40 Heavy Tank
- Fiat 3000
- Fiat L6/40
- OF-40 main battle tank
- Ariete (200)
- VCC-1 Camillino – Tracked Infantry Armoured Fighting Vehicle based on M113 with additional sloped armour. Similar to AIFV. Built for Italy and Saudi Arabia.
- VCC-2 – Italian version of M-113 with additional armour and firing ports for passengers.
- Dardo (500; deliveries ongoing)
- B1 Centauro wheeled tank destroyer (484)
- Freccia, infantry fighting variant of the Centauro
- Puma 4x4 (330; not complete as of mid-2005)
- Puma 6x6 (250; not complete as of mid-2005)
- Fiat 6614 G4x4
- Palmaria self-propelled howitzer

=== Armoured cars ===
- Autoblindo Lancia AB IZ – 4 wheel design of World War I
- Autoblindo Fiat AB 611 – 6x4 armoured car of the interwar period
- Ansaldo armored car – prototype of the interwar period (1925) based on a Pavesi tractor
- Autoblindo AB 40
- Autoblindo AB 41
- Autoblindo AB 43
- Sahariana – a jeep-like armoured car built by an independent manufacturer during World War II
- Autoblindo Lince – an Italian version of the British Daimler Dingo
- B1 Centauro – 8x8 wheeled tank destroyer
- Puma – modern 4x4 or 6x6 vehicle

== Japan ==
Armoured fighting vehicles produced in Japan

=== Amphibious tanks ===
- Type 2 Ka-Mi amphibious tank
- Type 3 Ka-Chi amphibious tank
- Type 5 To-Ku prototype amphibious tank

=== Light tanks ===
- Type 95 Ha-Go light tank
- Type 98 Ke-Ni light tank
- Type 2 Ke-To light tank
- Type 4 Ke-Nu light tank
- Type 5 Ke-Ho prototype light tank

=== Medium tanks ===
- Type 89 Chi-Ro (I-Go) medium tank
- Type 97 Chi-Ha medium tank
- Type 98 Chi-Ho prototype medium tank
- Type 1 Chi-He medium tank
- Type 3 Chi-Nu medium tank
- Type 4 Chi-To prototype medium tank
- Type 5 Chi-Ri prototype medium tank

=== Main battle tanks ===
- Type 61
- Type 74
- Type 90
- Type 10

=== Tankettes ===
- Type 92 Jyu-Sokosha tankette
- Type 94 tankette
- Type 97 Te-Ke tankette

=== Armoured cars ===
- Sumida M.2593
- Type 93 armoured car

=== Armoured personnel carriers ===
- Type 98 So-Da armoured personnel carrier
- Type 1 Ho-Ki armoured personnel carrier
- Type 1 Ho-Ha armoured halftrack/APC
- Type 60 armored personnel carrier
- Type 73 armored personnel carrier
- Type 96 armored personnel carrier

=== Miscellaneous armoured vehicles ===
- Type 87 Chi-I medium tank prototype
- Type 91 heavy tank prototype
- Type 95 heavy tank prototype
- Type 98 Ta-Se prototype self-propelled anti-aircraft gun
- Type 98 20 mm AAG tank prototype self-propelled anti-aircraft gun
- Type 1 Ho-I prototype infantry support tank
- Type 2 Ho-I infantry support tank
- Type 4 Ka-Tsu amphibious landing craft
- Type 4 Ha-To self-propelled mortar
- Type 4 Ho-Ro self-propelled gun
- Type 4 Ho-To prototype self-propelled gun
- Type 1 Ho-Ni I tank destroyer
- Type 1 Ho-Ni II 105 mm tank destroyer
- Type 3 Ho-Ni III tank destroyer
- Type 5 Na-To tank destroyer
- Type 74 105 mm self-propelled howitzer
- Type 75 155 mm self-propelled howitzer
- Type 99 155 mm self-propelled howitzer
- Type 60 self-propelled 106 mm recoilless gun
- Mitsubishi Type 89 IFV
- Komatsu LAV
- Type 87 self-propelled anti-aircraft gun
- Short barrel 120 mm gun tank
- Naval 12 cm SPG prototype

== Malaysia ==
Armoured fighting vehicles produced in Malaysia

=== Tracked armoured fighting vehicle ===
- DefTech ACV-300 Adnan

=== Wheeled armoured fighting vehicle ===
- DefTech AV8 Gempita
- DefTech AV4 Lipanbara
- Mildef Tarantula HMAV
- Mildef Ribat HMLTV
- Mildef Rentaka

=== Light tactical vehicle ===
- Cendana Auto 4x4
- Weststar GK-M1/M2

== Mexico ==
Armoured fighting vehicles produced in Mexico

- DN-III armoured personnel vehicle
- DN-IV "Caballo" (Horse) armoured personnel vehicle
- DN-V Bufalo (Buffalo) armoured personnel vehicle
- DN-VI armoured personnel vehicle (prototype, never reached production)
- DN-VII armoured personnel vehicle (prototype, never reached production)
- Sedena-Henschel HWK-11 – joint project with West Germany

== Myanmar ==
Armoured fighting vehicles produced in Myanmar

=== Tanks ===
- MMT-40 Light Tank (105 mm light tank based on 2S1U chassis)

=== Infantry fighting vehicles ===
- BAAC-73 4x4 infantry fighting vehicle
- BAAC-83 4x4 infantry fighting vehicle
- BAAC-84 4x4 infantry fighting vehicle
- BAAC-85 4x4 infantry fighting vehicle
- BAAC-86 4x4 infantry fighting vehicle
- BAAC-87 4x4 infantry fighting vehicle

=== Armoured personnel carriers ===
- ULARV-1 4x4 armoured personnel carrier with 14.5 mm machine gun
- ULARV-2 4x4 armoured personnel carrier with 14.5 mm machine gun and short-range Igla turret
- ULARV-3 6x6 armoured personnel carrier with RCWS (prototype)

=== Army scout vehicle ===
- MAV-1 4x4 light armoured vehicle
- MAV-2 4x4 light armoured vehicle
- MAV-3 4x4 light armoured vehicle
- MAV-4 4x4 light armoured vehicle
- Naung Yoe Jeep 4x4 armoured jeep
- Inlay Jeep 4x4 armoured jeep

=== armoured air-defence vehicle ===
- MADV-1 4x4 armoured air-defence vehicle based on Naung Yoe armoured jeep
- MADV-2 4x4 armoured air-defence vehicle based on MAV-1 light armoured vehicle

== Netherlands ==
Armoured fighting vehicles produced in the Netherlands

- YPR-765
- Boxer PWV with Germany and the United Kingdom (modern)
- Fennek

=== Armoured cars ===
- Overvalwagen
- Wilton-Fijenoord Pantserwagen
- DAF M39
- DAF YP-408

== New Zealand ==
Armoured fighting vehicles produced in New Zealand

- Bob Semple tank (prototype, World War II)
- Schofield tank (prototype, World War II)
- Universal Carrier (~1300, World War II)

=== Armoured cars ===
- Beaverette (NZ) light armoured car (208, World War II)

== North Korea ==
Armoured fighting vehicles produced in North Korea

=== Tanks ===
- Cheonma-2 3rd gen. main battle tank (modern)
- Ch'onma-ho 2nd gen. main battle tank (Cold War era)
- Pokpung-ho 2nd gen. main battle tank (modern)
- Type 82 "Sinhŭng" light tank

=== Armoured Personnel Carriers ===
- M-1973 VTT-323 APC
- M-1992 APC (Based on BRDM-2)

=== Self-propelled Artillery ===
- M-1978 "Koksan" 170 mm SP
- Type 89 "Koksan" 170 mm SP
- M-1974 152 mm SP
- M-1975 130 mm SP
- M-1992 130 mm SP
- M-1977 122 mm SP
- M-1981 122 mm SP
- M-1991 122 mm SP
- M-1992 120 mm SP

== Pakistan ==
Armoured fighting vehicles produced in Pakistan

=== Main battle tanks (MBT) ===
- Al-Khalid
- Al Khalid-1 (AK-1)
- Al-Khalid-2 (AK-2) (under development)
- Al-Zarrar
- Type-85 – Pakistani T-85IIAP variants were license made at HIT
- Type 69 – T-69IIMP variants were license made in Pakistan

=== Armoured recovery vehicles (ACRV) ===
- Type 84 - W653 variant was license made at HIT

=== Infantry fighting vehicles (IFV) ===
- Hamza IFV

=== Special operations vehicles (SOV) ===
- Predator SOV

=== Multirole combat vehicles (MCV) ===
- Hamza 8x8
- Hamza 6x6
- Hamza 6x6 Mk.2

=== Armoured personnel carriers (APC) ===
- ASV Dragoon – license made at HIT
- Interceptor 4x4 B6 – ASV
- Interceptor 4x4 B7 – ASV
- Mohafiz – internal security vehicles
  - Interceptor ASV
- M-113 – license made domestic variants
  - APC Talha – armoured personnel carrier
  - Al-Hadeed – armoured recovery vehicle
  - Al-Qaswa – armoured logistics vehicle
  - Sakb – armoured command vehicle
- Protector – ASV

=== Self-propelled guns (SPG) ===
- M-109A2 – license made at HIT

== Poland ==
Armoured fighting vehicles produced in Poland

=== Armoured cars ===
- Ford FT-B (~17)
- wz. 28 (92)
- wz. 29 Ursus (11)
- wz. 34 (~80)
- Kubuś (1)
- BRDM-2M Żbik
- AMZ Tur
- Jenot (1 prototype)
- Żubr
- Dzik
- Oncilla

=== Armoured personnel carriers ===
- OT-62 Topas (600)
- OT-64 SKOT (4,500)
- Waran
- LOTR Kleszcz (0/300)

=== Infantry fighting vehicles ===
- BWP-1 IFV (1298)
- BWR-1K (22) – reconnaissance variant of BWP-1
- BWR-1S (16) – reconnaissance variant of BWP-1
- BWP-95 (1 prototype)
- BWP-1 Delco modernization (1 prototype)
- BWP-2000 (2 prototypes)
- BWO-40 (1 prototype)
- BWP Anders (2 prototypes)
- KTO Ryś
- KTO Irbis
- KTO Rosomak
- BWP Borsuk (5)

=== Tankettes ===
- TK-1 (1 prototype)
- TK-2 (1 prototype)
- TK-3 (~300)
- TKW (1 prototype)
- TKD (4 prototypes)
- TKF (~18)
- TKS (~390)
- TKS-D (2 prototypes)

=== Light tanks ===
- WB-10 (2 prototypes)
- 4TP (1 prototype)
- 7TP dw
- 7TP jw
- 9TP (13)
- 10TP (1 prototype)
- 14TP (1 incomplete prototype)

=== Main battle tanks ===
- T-55AM Merida (modernized T-55)
- T-55AD-2M (command variant)
- T-55AMS (modernized T-55)
- T-55AD-1M (modernized T-55)
- T-72M1Z (upgraded T-72M1)
- PT-91 Twardy (~285)
- PT-16 Twardy
- PT-17 (1 prototype)
- Leopard 2PL (62/142)
- K2PL Wilk (0/820)

=== Self-propelled anti-aircraft weapons ===
- PZA Loara (1 prototype)
- ZSU-23-4MP Biała (20)
- WWO Wilk (1 prototype)
- WWO Anders (2 prototypes)
- M120 Rak (92/122)
- AHS Krab
- K9PL (0/606)

=== Armoured recovery vehicles ===
- WZT-1
- WZT-2 (600)
- WZT-3
- WZT-4
- MID (7)

=== Amphibious vehicles ===
- PZInż.130 (1 prototype)

== Portugal ==
Armoured fighting vehicles produced in Portugal

- Bravia Chaimite wheeled 4x4 APC
- Bravia Comando wheeled 4x4 armoured patrol vehicle

== Romania ==
Armoured fighting vehicles produced in Romania

=== Armoured cars ===
- ABC-79M
- ABI

=== Armoured personnel carriers ===
- MLVM (armoured vehicle)
- TAB-71
- TAB-77
- B-33 Zimbru
- RN-94 – prototype
- Saur 1 – prototype
- Saur 2 – prototype
- Zimbru 2000 – prototype

=== Infantry fighting vehicles ===
- MLI-84 – derived from BMP-1
- MLI-84M Jderul – modern upgrade of MLI-84

=== Tanks ===
==== World War II ====
- R-1 – 35 bought from Czechoslovakia, designed specially for the Romanian army, 1 produced in Romania
- R-2 – Czechoslovak LT vz. 35 with changes made specially for the Romanian army (see R-2c)
- R-3 – proposal
- 1942 medium tank – proposal
- T-34 with 120/150 mm gun – proposal

==== Modern ====
- TR-580 (prototypes called TR-77)
- TR-85
- TR-85M1 Bizonul – modern upgrade of TR-85 tanks
- TR-125 – prototypes of local produced variant of T-72

=== Tank destroyers ===
- Mareșal – prototypes and early serial production built during WWII, later used by the Germans in the development of the Hetzer
- TACAM T-60 – 34 conversions of Soviet light tanks during WWII
- TACAM R-2 – 20 conversions of Czechoslovak-supplied R-2 light tanks during WWII
- TACAM R-1 – proposal
- TACAM T-38 – proposal
- Vânătorul de care R35 – tank destroyer version of the Renault R35

=== Self-propelled artillery ===
- Model 89 – licensed built 2S1 Gvozdika on MLI-84 chassis

=== Self-propelled anti-aircraft weapons ===
- CA-95 – modern, carries four surface-to-air missiles

== Russian Empire ==
Armoured fighting vehicles produced in the Russian Empire (see also #Russian Federation and #Soviet Union)

- Vezdekhod (prototype only)
- Tsar Tank wheeled armoured gun carrier (prototype only)
- Austin-Putilov, improved Austin armoured car
- Izhorski-Fiat armoured car
- Poplavko-Jeffery – An oddly shaped design, built on chassis of a Thomas B. Jeffery Company truck. It had a good service record and was used after the war by Poland.
- Garford-Putilov armoured car
- Russo-Balt armoured car

== Russian Federation ==
Armoured fighting vehicles produced in the Russian Federation (see also #Russian Empire and #Soviet Union)

- BTR-90
- Black Eagle tank prototype
- BMD-4
- T-80U
- T-90
- T-95 rumoured
- Armata Universal Combat Platform

== Saudi Arabia ==
Armoured fighting vehicles produced in Saudi Arabia

=== Infantry fighting vehicles ===
- Al-Fahd IFV
- Al-Faris IFV

=== Armoured personnel carriers & support vehicles ===
- Shibl-1 4×4 APC Four seats
- Shibl-2 4×4 APC Eight seats
- Al-Masmak APC
- Al-Naif armoured vehicle
- Al-Mansoor armoured vehicle
- Der' Al-Jazeerah-1 AFV
- Der' Al-Jazeerah-2 AFV
- Al-Kaser IFV for counter-terrorism
- Al-Naif 5 APC
- Al-Naif 7 APC
- Al-Naif 9 APC
- Al-Faisal AFV
- Salman Al-Hazm

== Serbia ==
Armoured fighting vehicles produced in Serbia

- M-84 main battle tank (planned to be upgraded to M-84AS1)
- M-80A infantry fighting vehicle (planned to be upgrade to M-98 Vidra)
- BOV M-86 armoured personnel carrier, used by military police
- M-84AI armoured recovery vehicle version of M-84, used in tank battalions
- BOV-1 antitank guided missile vehicle
- Lazar BVT mine resistant, ambush protected armoured fighting vehicle
- Lazar 3 armoured personnel carrier
- BOV M16 Miloš armoured vehicle
- Zastava M20 mine resistant, ambush protected armoured fighting vehicle
- Zastava NTV armoured utility vehicle

== Singapore ==
Armoured fighting vehicles produced in Singapore

- Bionix 28-ton replacement for M113 with 25 mm Bushmaster cannon (Bionix 25) or the CIS 40 mm AGL/.50 calibre HMG (Bionix 40/50)
- Bionix Updated Version of the Bionix with better armour and 30 mm Bushmaster
- Bronco All Terrain Tracked Carrier
- SSPH Primus 155 mm SP gun
- Terrex Infantry carrier vehicle
- Hunter AFV Armored Fighting Vehicle
- M113A2 Ultra IFV + M113A2 Ultra OWS Armoured personnel carrier
- Light Strike Vehicle Light Strike Vehicle
- Peacekeeper PRV Armoured personnel carrier
- Belrex Protected Combat Support Vehicle/ MRAP
- FH-2000 Towed howitzer
- SLWH Pegasus Towed howitzer
- Bionix Armoured combat engineering vehicle
- Bionix ARV Armoured combat engineering vehicle
- Bionix BLB Armored vehicle-launched Bridge
- ST Aerospace Skyblade Man-portable mini-UAV

== Slovakia ==
Armoured fighting vehicles produced in Slovakia

=== Armoured cars ===
- Aligator 4x4 – first generation multi-purpose armored car
- Aligator 4x4 Master – upgraded prototype of first generation armored car
- Aligator 4x4 Master II – second generation multi-purpose armored car

=== Armoured personnel carriers ===
- Tatrapan 6x6 – armored truck (with armored personnel carrier variant), derived from Tatra 815 truck

=== Artillery ===
- Zuzana – wheeled self-propelled artillery (self-propelled howitzer, first generation, derived from DANA)
- Himalaya – tracked self-propelled artillery prototype (Zuzana howitzer turret on T-72 chassis), evaluated but did not enter production
- Zuzana 2 – wheeled self-propelled artillery (self-propelled howitzer, second generation)
- EVA – wheeled self-propelled artillery prototypes (self-propelled howitzer, lighter and smaller than the Zuzana series, designed for easy airlift and transport), currently not in production

=== Other projects ===
- BRAMS – wheeled self-propelled anti-aircraft system prototype (anti-aircraft turret on Tatra 815 chassis), not in production
- Božena 5 – mine clearing vehicle, mine-flail

== Slovenia ==
Armoured fighting vehicles produced in Slovenia

- Valuk 6x6 (LWAV)
- M-55S – Upgraded MBT T-55
- Krpan 8x8 – Modernized Steyer-Daimler-Puch Pandur II
- Svarun 8x8

== South Africa ==
Armoured fighting vehicles produced in South Africa

=== Tanks ===
==== Main battle tanks ====
- Olifant Mk1A

==== Prototype tanks ====
- Semel
- Skokiaan

=== Self-propelled artillery ===
- G6 howitzer
- Valkiri

=== Infantry fighting vehicles ===
- Ratel
- Mbombe

=== Armoured personnel carriers ===
- Buffel
- Casspir
- Hippo
- Mamba
- Marauder
- RCV-9
- Reva
- RG-12
- RG-19
- RG-31 Nyala
- RG-32 Scout
- RG-33
- RG-34
- RG-35
- RG-41
- RG Outrider
- PUMA M26-15

=== Armoured cars ===
- Eland
- Marmon-Herrington armoured car
- Rooikat

== South Korea ==
Armoured fighting vehicles produced in South Korea

- K1 MBT
- K1A1 MBT
- K2 Black Panther MBT
- K-200 IFV
- K21 IFV
- K242A1 / K281A1 mortar carrier
- K263A1 self-propelled radar-guided Vulcan
- K288A1 recovery vehicle
- K30 Biho twin 30 mm SPAA
- K9 Thunder 155 mm SPH
- K10 ammunition resupply vehicle (ARV)
- Barracuda APC

== Soviet Union ==
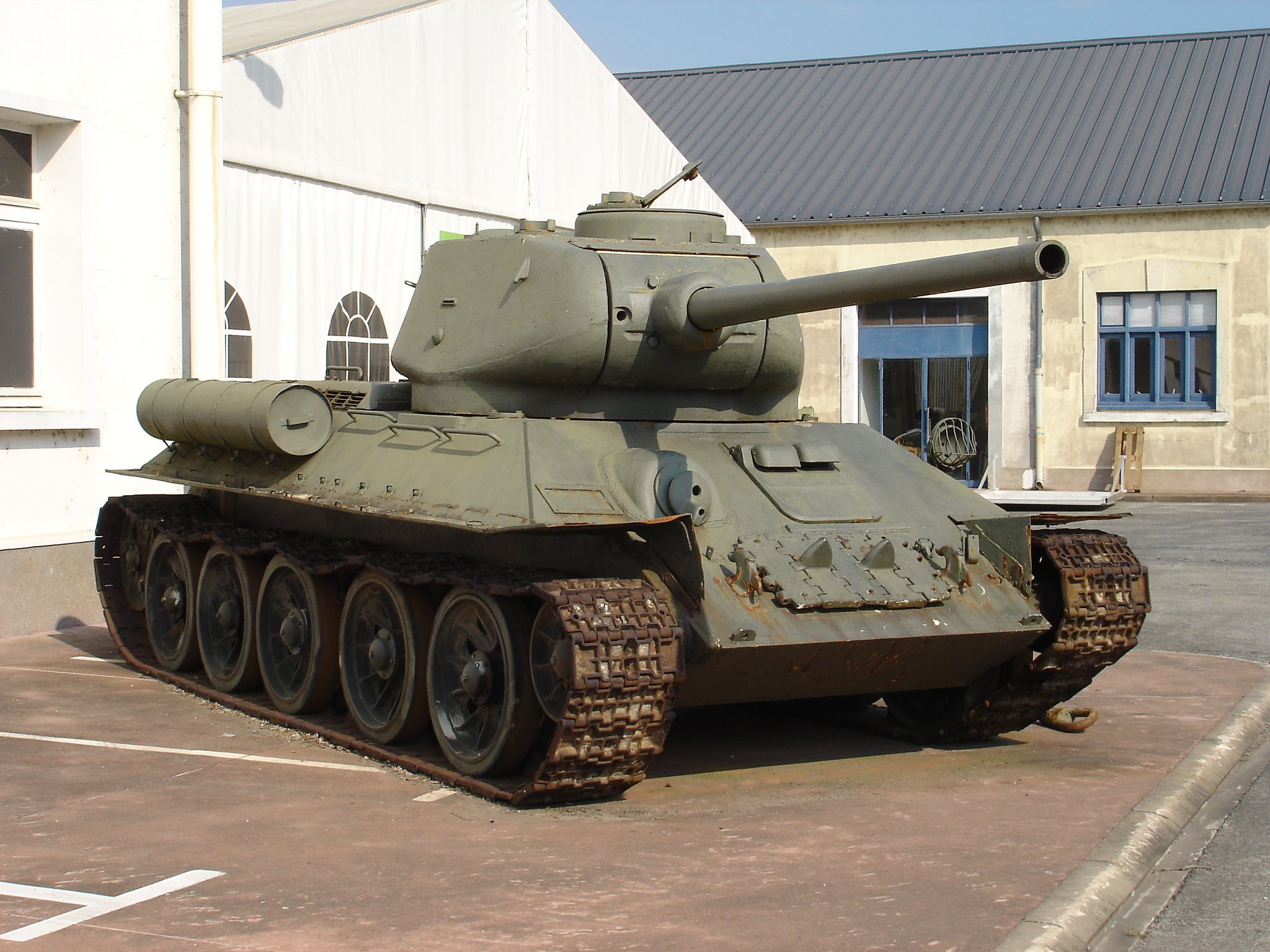
A T-34-85 tank on display at Musée des Blindés in April 2007.

Armoured fighting vehicles produced in the USSR (see also #Russian Empire, #Russian Federation and #Ukraine)

- KV-1/KV-2
- IS-2/IS-3
- BT tank
- BT-7
- PT-76
- T-10
- T-12
- T-24
- T-26
- T-28
- T-34
- T-34-85
- T-35
- T-40
- T-50
- T-54
- T-55
- T-60
- T-62
- T-64
- T-70
- T-72
- T-80
- T-80 light tank

=== Air-portable fighting vehicles ===
- 9K22 Tunguska
- Antonov A-40 flying tank prototype
- ASU-57
- ASU-85
- BMD-1
- BMD-2
- BMD-3
- BTR-D

=== Self-propelled guns ===
- 2A3 Kondensator 2P
- 2S1 Gvozdika
- 2S3 Akatsiya
- 2S4 Tyulpan
- 2S5 Giatsint-S
- 2S7 Pion
- 2S9 Nona
- 2S19 Msta
- 2S23 Nona-SVK
- 2S30 Iset
- 2S31 Vena
- SU-5
- SU-6
- SU-7
- SU-8
- SU-12
- SU-14
- SU-57 (Lend-lease 57 mm gun motor carriage T48)
- SU-57B
- SU-74
- SU-76
- SU-85
- SU-85A, prototype based on SU-76
- SU-85B, prototype based on SU-76
- SU-100
- SU-100Y
- SU-122
- SU-122P, long-barreled prototype
- SU-152
- SU-212
- SU-BU-10
- ISU-122
- ISU-130
- ISU-152

=== Armoured cars ===
- FAI – interwar
- BA-I, BA-3, BA-6, BA-9, BA-10, BA-11 – a series of interwar 6-wheeled heavy armoured cars
- BA-5 – interwar
- BA-20 – interwar
- BA-21 – interwar
- BA-27 – interwar
- BA-64, World War II
- BRDM-1 or BTR-40P
- BRDM-2
- BRM-1 or BMP-R
- D-8 armored car – interwar
- D-12 Armored car – interwar
- LB-23 – World War II
- LB-62 – World War II
- LB-NATI – World War II

=== Armoured Personnel carriers and Infantry fighting vehicles ===
- BMP-1
- BMP-2
- BMP-3
- BTR-40
- BTR-50
- BTR-60
- BTR-70
- BTR-80
- BTR-90
- BTR-152
- BTR-T
- MT-LB

== Spain ==
Armoured fighting vehicles produced in Spain

=== Tanks ===
- Trubia A4
- Verdeja
- AMX-30E, codevelopment with France
- Lince (unfinished tank project)
- Leopard 2E, codevelopment with Germany

=== Multiple rocket launcher ===
- Teruel MRL
- SILAM (es:SILAM)

=== Armored cars ===
- Bilbao Modelo 1932 – interwar vehicle
- UNL-35 – interwar vehicle
- AAC-1937 – interwar vehicle, codevelopment with Soviet Union
- URO VAMTAC - modern 4x4 vehicle

=== Armoured personnel carriers ===
- BMR – modern 6x6 vehicle
- VAC - (es:VAC)

=== Infantry fighting vehicles ===
- VEC – modern 6x6 vehicle
- Pizarro IFV, codevelopment with Austria
- Dragón - modern 8x8 vehicle (es:Dragón)

== Sri Lanka ==
Armoured fighting vehicles produced in Sri Lanka

- Unibuffel
- Unicorn
- UniAIMOV
- Unicob

== Sudan ==
- Ford 30 cwt armoured car operated by the Sudan Defence Force (45, World War II)

== Sweden ==
Armoured fighting vehicles produced in Sweden

=== Light tanks ===
- Landsverk L-5 (prototype)
- Landsverk L-100 (prototype)
- Landsverk L-101 (prototype)
- Landsverk L-120 (prototype)
- Stridsvagn m/21-29 (10)
- Stridsvagn fm/31 (prototype)
- Stridsvagn m/31 (3)
- Stridsvagn m/37 (48)
- Landsverk L-60 (3)
- Stridsvagn m/38 (16)
- Stridsvagn m/39 (20)
- Stridsvagn m/40L (100)
- Stridsvagn m/40K (80)
- Stridsvagn m/41 (220)

=== Medium tanks ===
- Stridsvagn m/42 (282)
- Stridsvagn 74 (225)

=== Main battle tanks ===
- Stridsvagn 103 (290)
- Stridsvagn 104 (80)
- Stridsvagn 122 (91 produced under license)

=== Tank destroyers ===
- Pansarvärnskanonvagn m/43 (87)
- Infanterikanonvagn 91 (212)
- Pansarvärnsrobotbandvagn 551 (57)

=== Self-propelled artillery ===
- Bandkanon 1 (26)
- Archer artillery system (48)
- Granatkastarpansarbandvagn 90 (60)

=== Self-propelled guns ===
- Stormartillerivagn m/43 (36)
- Infanterikanonvagn 72 (36)
- Infanterikanonvagn 102 (36)
- Infanterikanonvagn 103 (81)

=== Self-propelled anti-air ===
- Luftvärnskanonvagn L-62 Anti II (5)
- Luftvärnskanonvagn fm/43 (17)
- Luftvärnsrobotbandvagn 701 (48)
- Luftvärnskanonvagn 90 (16)

=== Armoured cars ===
- Pansarbil fm/25, fm/26 (3)
- Pansarbil fm/29 (1)
- Pansarbil m/31 (32)
- Pansarbil m/39 (30)
- Pansarbil m/40 (15)
- Landsverk L-180, L-181 and L-182 (24)
- Landsverk L-185 (1 exported to Denmark as FP6)

=== Armoured personnel carriers and infantry fighting vehicles ===
- Terrängbil m/42 (500)
- Pansarbandvagn 301 (220)
- Pansarbandvagn 302 (644)
- Combat Vehicle 90 (1000+)
- Bandvagn 206 S (50)

== Switzerland ==
Armoured fighting vehicles produced in Switzerland

- Panzer 58 (Medium tank)
- Panzer 61 (Main battle tank)
- Panzer 68 (Main battle tank)
- Panzer 87 (Main battle tank, license-built Leopard 2)
- Mowag Piranha available in 4x4, 6x6, 8x8 and 10x10 versions

=== Derivative vehicles ===
- Entpannungspanzer 65: Recovery Tank 65 - vehicle recovery variant.
- Panzerartilleriekanone 68
- Brückenpanzer 68: Bridge Tank 68 - bridge-laying variant, with single-piece span instead of more common scissors bridge, capable of spanning 18.2 metres (59 ft 9 in) gap; 30 produced between 1974 and 1977 and used until 2011
- Fliegerabwehrpanzer 68: Anti-aircraft Tank 68 - variant fitted with Flakpanzer Gepard turret, mounting two Oerlikon 35mm anti-aircraft guns, on Panzer 68 hull widened by 180 millimetres (7 in); two tanks modified and tested in 1979-1980, not placed into production
- Zielfahrzeug 68: Target Vehicle 68 - mobile target for training troops in the use of the M47 Dragon American-made anti-tank missile; modifications included the removal of the turret and its replacement with a dummy turret and gun, extra easily replaceable steel skirt plates protecting the tracks, and running gear changed to the tracks and wheels of the Panzer 61.

== Taiwan ==
Armoured fighting vehicles produced in Taiwan (ROC)

=== Tanks ===
- CM12
- CM11
- M41D
- Type 64

=== Tracked armoured fighting vehicles ===
- CM21
- CM22 (M106)
- CM23 (M125)
- CM24
- CM25 (improved TOW vehicle)
- CM26 (M577)
- CM27

=== Wheeled armoured fighting vehicles ===
- CM-32

== Thailand ==
Armoured fighting vehicles produced in Thailand

Wheeled armoured fighting vehicle

- AWAV 8x8
- Black Widow Spider 8×8
- R-600 8×8
- Sea Tiger AAPC 8x8

Wheeled armoured personnel carrier

- First Win
- Jackal
- Phantom 380-X
- HMV-420P

== Turkey ==
Armoured fighting vehicles produced in Turkey

=== Tanks ===
- MİTÜP Altay main battle tank
- M60T/Sabra
- Kaplan MT

=== Infantry fighting vehicles ===
- ACV-S IFV
- ACV-300 IFV
- FNSS Kaplan 20 and 30 IFVs
- Otokar Tulpar IFV

=== Self-propelled artillery ===
- FNSS ACV-19
- T-155 Fırtına

=== Self-propelled anti-aircraft weapons ===
- Atilgan
- Zipkin
- Hisar-A
- KORKUT

=== Armoured personnel carriers and support vehicles ===
==== 4x4 Armoured vehicles ====
- Otokar Cobra – Rubber tire-wheeled 4 x 4 Armoured Vehicle capable of carrying up to 8 personnel. It has an amphibious version as well.
- Otokar Cobra II
- Otokar Ural
- Otokar Kaya
- BMC Kirpi
- Otokar Kale
- Otokar Engerek
- Otokar Akrep
- Otokar Akrep II Armored Electric Vehicle
- BMC Kirpi II
- BMC Vuran MPAV
- BMC Amazon
- Nurol Ejder Yalçın
- FNSS Pars

==== 6x6 and 8x8 Armoured vehicles ====
- Pars 8x8
- Pars 6x6
- Otokar DASW
- BMC MRAP
- Otokar Arma 6x6
- Otokar Arma 8x8
- Yavuz Variant of Terrex (APC 8x8)
- Nurol Ejder

==== Tracked armoured vehicles ====
- FNSS ACV-15
- FNSS ACV-30
- LAWC-T
- FNSS Kunduz
- FNSS Samur
- Tosun
- ACV-300 APC (Also see FNSS)
- ACV-S TLC
- IS-V

== Ukraine ==
Armoured fighting vehicles produced in Ukraine (see also #Soviet Union)

=== Armoured cars ===
- Dozor-B
- VEPR

=== Tanks ===
- T-80UD
- T-84
- T-84U
- T-84 Oplot
- T-84-120 Yatagan

=== Infantry carriers ===
- BTR-3U
- BTR-4
- BTR-7
- BTR-94
- BMPV-64 heavy IFV
- BTRV-64 heavy APC
- BMT-72 heavy IFV
- BTMP-84 heavy IFV
- Kevlar-E
- BMP-1LB IFV

=== Support vehicles ===
- BTS-5B ARV (Ukrainian version of BREM-1, based on T-72 tank)
- MTU-80 bridgelayer
- BREM-84 ARV
- BMU-84 bridgelayer

=== Upgrades ===
- T-55AGM
- T-64U
- T-64BM
- T-72AM Banan
- T-72MP
- T-72AG
- T-72-120

== United Kingdom ==
Armoured fighting vehicles produced in the United Kingdom

=== Tanks ===
==== First World War ====
- Little Willie (prototype; World War I)
- "Mother" (prototype; World War I)
- Mark I heavy tank (150; World War I)
- Mark II heavy tank (50; World War I)
- Mark III heavy tank (50; World War I)
- Mark IV heavy tank (1220; World War I)
- Mark V heavy tank (1242; World War I)
- Mark VIII "Liberty" Anglo-American heavy tank (25, 1919)
- Mark IX armoured personnel carrier (34; World War I)
- Medium Mark A Whippet medium tank (200; World War I)
- Medium Mark B medium tank (102; World War I)
- Medium Mark C medium tank (50; World War I)

==== Interwar ====
- Vickers 6-Ton
- Light Tank Mk II
- Light Tank Mk III
- Light Tank Mk IV
- Light Tank Mk V
- Light Tank Mk VI
- Vickers A1E1 Independent tank prototype
- Vickers Medium Mark I
- Vickers Medium Mark II
- Vickers Medium Mark III
- Carden Loyd tankette

==== Second World War ====
- A43 Black Prince prototype heavy tank
- Avenger prototype
- Light Tank Mk VII Tetrarch
- Light Tank Mk VIII prototype
- Cruiser Mk I
- Cruiser Mk II
- Cruiser Mk III
- Cruiser Mk IV
- Cruiser Mk V Covenanter
- Cruiser Mk VI Crusader
- Cruiser Mk VII Cavalier
- Cruiser Mk VIII Centaur
- Cruiser Mk VIII Cromwell
- Cruiser Mk VIII Challenger
- Comet
- Infantry Mk I Matilda
- Infantry Mk II Matilda
- Infantry Mk III Valentine
- Infantry Mk IV Churchill
- TOG 1 – prototype heavy tank
- TOG 2 – prototype heavy tank
- Excelsior prototype
- A39 Tortoise Heavy Assault Tank – prototype
- A34 Valiant – prototype

Post World War II

- Centurion
- FV4101 Charioteer (200)
- Conqueror (200) heavy tank
- Chieftain main battle tank
- Challenger 1 main battle tank
- Challenger 2 main battle tank
- Vickers MBT (Export market main battle tank)
- FV201 Universal Tank (A45) prototype
- FV4004 120 mm Gun Conway prototype
- FV4005 183 mm Gun Tank prototype

=== Self-propelled artillery ===
- Birch gun
- Alecto prototype
- Gun Carrier Mark I self-propelled artillery (48; World War I)
- Tracked Rapier – self-propelled AA missile launcher
- Abbot FV433 self-propelled artillery
- Bishop
- Deacon wheeled anti-tank gun
- 17pdr SP Achilles US produced with British anti-tank gun
- 17pdr SP Archer anti-tank gun
- AS-90

=== Armoured cars ===
World War I

- Austin armoured car
- Rolls-Royce armoured car
- Lanchester armoured car 4x2
- Fordson armoured car

Interwar

- Alvis-Straussler armoured car
- Lanchester armoured car 6x4
- Peerless armoured car

World War II

- AEC armoured car
- Armadillo
- Coventry armoured car
- Daimler armoured car
- Daimler Dingo
- Guy armoured car
- Humber armoured car
- Humber scout car
- Humber light reconnaissance car
- Morris CS9
- Morris light reconnaissance car
- Standard Beaverette

Post World War II

- Alvis Saladin
- Ferret scout car
- Fox Armoured Reconnaissance Vehicle
- Land Rover Tangi- Northern Ireland internal security vehicle
- Shorland – Northern Ireland internal security vehicle

=== Armoured personnel carriers and support vehicles ===
- Gun Carrier Crane armoured recovery vehicle (2; World War I)
- Sabre Armoured Reconnaissance Vehicle (136)
- FV101 Scorpion Armoured Reconnaissance Vehicle
- FV102 Striker Swingfire anti-tank missile launcher
- FV104 Samaritan armoured ambulance
- FV105 Sultan Armoured Command Vehicle
- FV106 Samson Armoured Recovery Vehicle
- FV107 Scimitar Armoured Reconnaissance Vehicle
- Warrior Infantry Fighting Vehicle
- Alvis Stormer armoured vehicle family
- FV 432 AFV armoured personnel carrier and variants
- FV222 Conqueror ARV
- Alvis Saracen armoured personnel carrier
- FV 1611 Humber Armoured Personnel Carrier
- FV103 Spartan Armoured Personnel Carrier
- Saxon Armoured Personnel Carrier
- Viking Armoured Vehicle
- Boxer (armoured fighting vehicle), with Germany and the Netherlands (modern)
- AEC armoured command vehicle – World War II 4x4 or 6x6 armoured command vehicle
- Guy Lizard – World War II 4x4 armoured command vehicle
- Panther Command and Liaison Vehicle – 21st century vehicle to replace some CVRT and FV432
- Bedford OXA – World War II armoured lorry.
- Guy Universal Wheeled Carrier – World War II experimental 4x4 carrier
- Pierce-Arrow Armoured AA Lorry – World War I vehicle
- Thornycroft Bison – World War II armoured lorry
- Universal Carrier – World War II

== United States ==
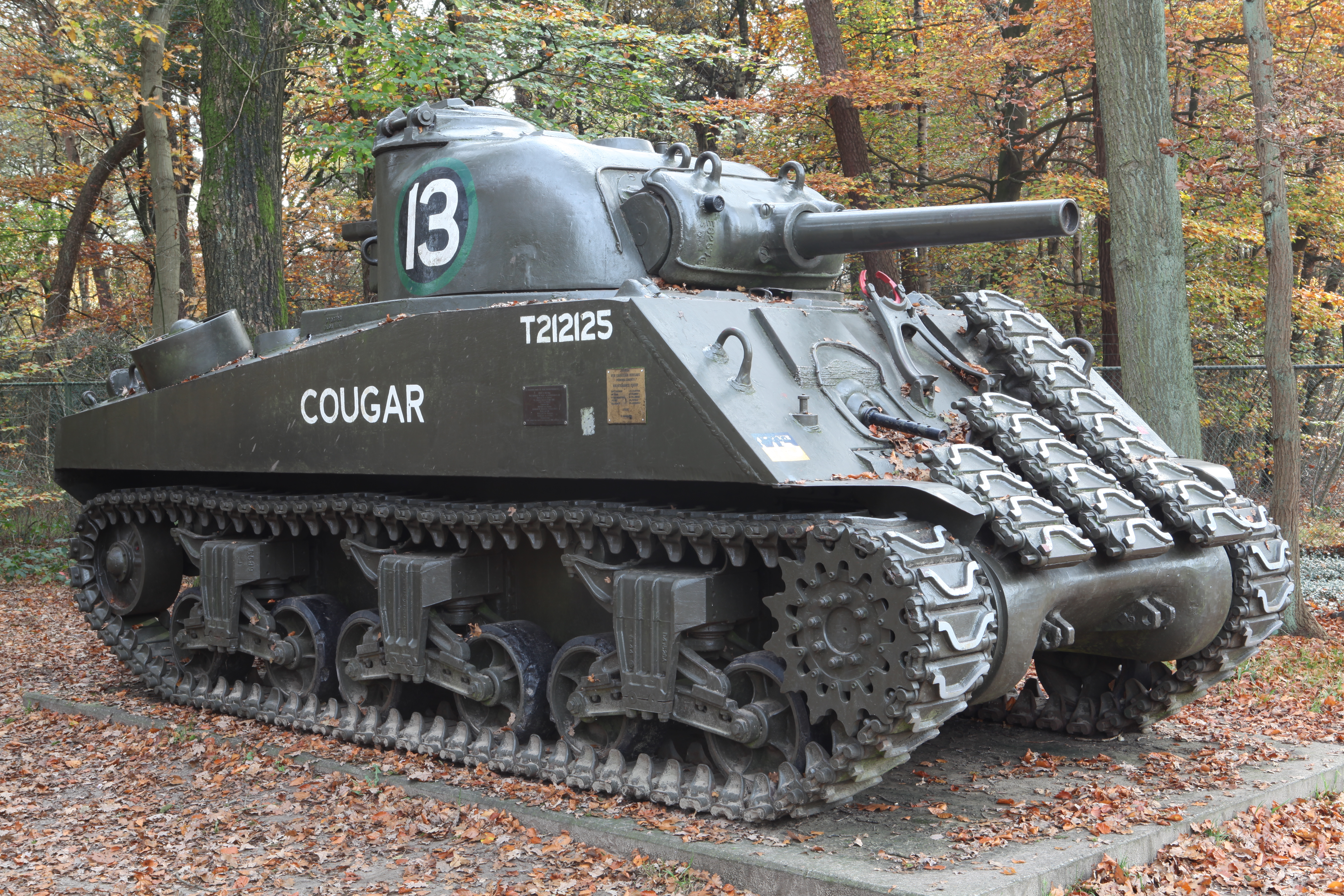
The M4 Sherman was produced in greater numbers than any other U.S. tank in World War II.

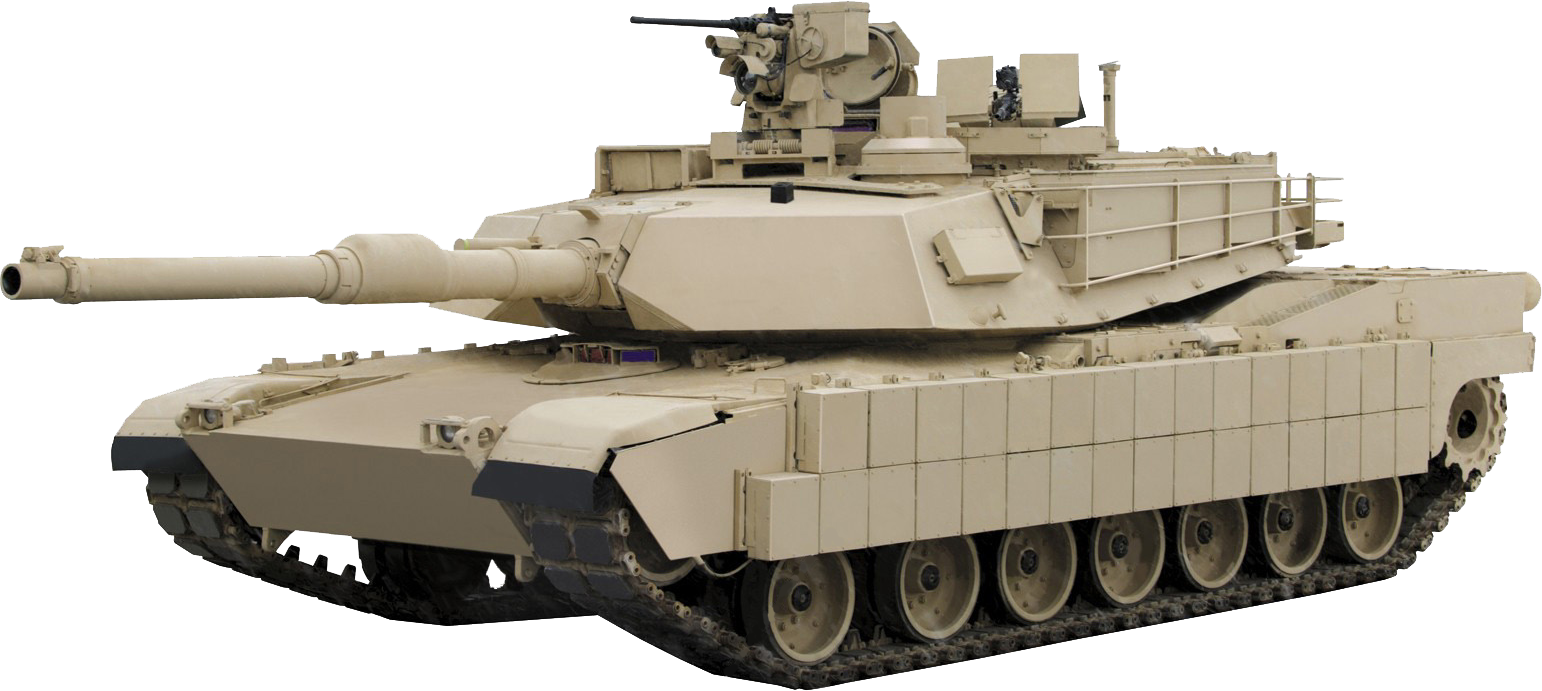
M1A2 Abrams with prototype TUSK equipment and Common Remotely Operated Weapons Station (CROWS), with 0.50-inch caliber machine gun at the commander's station Front · Rear

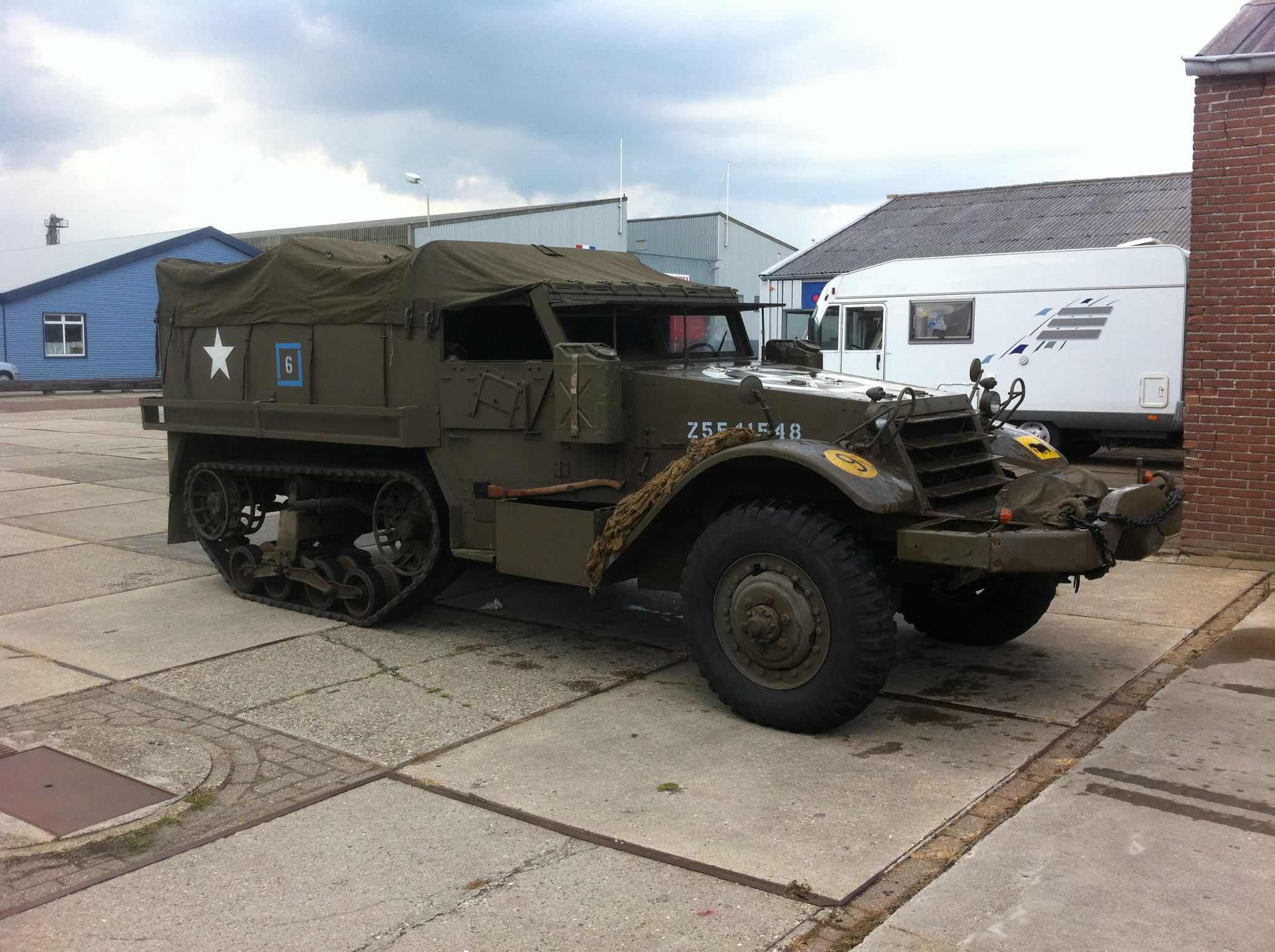
A preserved M5 Half-track.

Armoured fighting vehicles produced in the United States

=== Tanks ===
==== Light tanks ====
- M1917 - Licensed-built French Renault FT.
- Marmon-Herrington CTLS
- M1 combat car- 113 built
- T7 Combat Car
- M2 light tank (World War II, 10 M2A1, 239 M2A2, 72 M2A3, 375 M2A4)
- M3 Stuart tank
- M5 Stuart tank
- M22 Locust light airborne tank
- M24 Chaffee
- M41 Walker Bulldog
- T92
- M551 Sheridan light airborne tank
- M8 armored gun system
- M132 armored flamethrower
- M901 Improved TOW Vehicle
- Stingray light tank
- CCV-L light tank
- M56 SPG
- M50 Ontos self-propelled rifle
- M10 Booker

==== Medium tanks ====
- M2 medium tank
- M3 medium
- M3A1
- M3A2
- M3A3
- M3A4
- M3A5
- M4
- M4A1
- M4A1(76)W
- M4A1E4/M4A1(76)W
- M4A1E8/M4A1(76)W HVSS
- M4A1E9
- M4A2
- M4A2E8/M4A2(76)W HVSS
- M4A3
- M4A3W
- M4A3(75)
- M4A3E4/M4A3(76)W
- M4A3E8(76)W Easy Eight
- M4A3E8/M4A3(76)W HVSS
- M4A4
- M4A6
- M4 Dozer (fitted with dozer blade.)
- M4A3R3 flame thrower Zippo
- T20 medium tank prototype
- M7 medium tank

==== Heavy tanks ====
- M6 heavy tank prototype
- T14 heavy tank prototype
- T29 heavy tank prototype
- T30 heavy tank prototype
- T34 heavy tank prototype
- M26 Pershing (later reclassified as medium)

==== Assault tanks ====
- M4A3E2 Jumbo
- T-28 super-heavy tank prototype
- M103 heavy tank

==== Main battle tanks ====
- MBT-70 prototype
- M46 Patton
- M47 Patton
- M48 Patton
- M60 Patton
- M1 Abrams
  - M1 armored recovery vehicle (prototype only)
  - M1 assault breacher vehicle (military engineering vehicle)
  - M1 CATTB (prototype only)
  - M1 Grizzly combat mobility vehicle (prototype only)
  - M1 Panther II (mine clearing vehicle)
  - M1 Thumper (prototype only)
  - M1 TTB (prototype only)
  - M1IP
  - M1A1
    - M1A1AIM v.1
      - M1A1AIM v.2
        - M1A1FEP
    - M1A1D
    - M1A1HA
    - M1A1HC
    - M1A1KVT
    - M1A1M (Republic of Iraq export variant)
    - M1A1SA (Kingdom of Morocco export variant)
    - M1A2
      - M1A2S (Kingdom of Saudi Arabia export variant)
      - M1A2SEP v.1
        - M1A2SEP v.2
        - M1A2SEP v.3
    - M1A3

=== Self-propelled artillery ===
- T19 howitzer motor carriage
- T30 howitzer motor carriage
- T40/M9 howitzer motor carriage
- M7 Priest
- M12 gun motor carriage
- M21 mortar motor carriage
- M37 105mm howitzer motor carriage
- M41 howitzer motor carriage
- M44 self-propelled howitzer
- M53 155mm self-propelled gun
- M109 155 mm SP howitzer Paladin
- M110 8-inch howitzer
- M84 mortar carrier
- M6 Bradley Linebacker SHORAD

=== Self-propelled anti-air ===
- M13 multiple gun motor carriage
- M16 multiple gun motor carriage
- M19 multiple gun motor carriage
- M42 "Duster" 40 mm self-propelled anti-aircraft gun
- M163 Vulcan air defense system
- M247 Sgt. York DIVAD
- M730 Chaparral self-propelled SAM launcher

=== Personnel carriers and infantry fighting vehicles ===
- LVTP-5
- LVTP7/AAVP7A1 amphibious armoured carrier
- M2/M3 Bradley Fighting Vehicle Infantry and Cavalry Fighting Vehicles
- M1120 Series
- M59 armored personnel carrier
- M75 armored personnel carrier
- M113 armored personnel carrier
- M56 Coyote Light Smoke Generator Vehicle
- Cadillac Gage Commando V-150 APC (300 for Taiwan)
- LAV-25 Amphibious Reconnaissance / Infantry fighting vehicle made by General Dynamics Land Systems Canada.
- AIFV

=== Armoured cars ===
- American LaFrance TK-6 – built for Persia
- Cadillac Gage V-100 Commando – Postwar 4 wheel armoured car / APC
- Jeffery armored car – World War I
- King armored car, World War I vehicle for the short-lived 1st Armored Car Squadron (United States Marines)
- LAV-300
- M1 armored car – interwar
- M2 scout car – interwar
- M3 scout car – World War II
- M8 Greyhound
- M38 Wolfhound prototype
- M1117 armored security vehicle – modern 4x4 design
- M1200 Armored Knight – LAV
- T7 combat car – interwar
- T11 armored car – interwar
- T13 armored car – World War II
- T17 Deerhound – World War II
- T17E1 Staghound – World War II
- T18 Boarhound – World War II
- T19 armored car – World War II
- T21 armored car – World War II
- T22 / M8 Greyhound – World War II
- T23 armored car – World War II
- T27 armored car – World War II
- T28 / M38 Wolfhound – World War II
- ULTRA AP – Concept replacement for Humvee.

=== Amphibious vehicles ===
- LVT-1
- LVT-2 Water Buffalo
- LVT(A)-1
- LVT(A)-2 Water Buffalo
- LVT-4 Water Buffalo
- LVT(A)-3
- LVT-3 Bushmaster
- LVT(A)-4
- LVT(A)-5
- LVT-3C
- DUKW (six-wheel-drive amphibious truck with a provision for an MG mount)
- Sherman DD amphibious tank (DD – Duplex drive)

=== Armored half-tracks ===
- M2 Half Track Car
- M3 Half-track
- M5 Half-track
- M9 Half-track

== Vietnam ==
Armoured fighting vehicles produced in Vietnam

=== Infantry fighting vehicles ===
- XCB-01

=== Amphibious armoured personnel carriers ===
- XTC-02
- XTC-03

== Zimbabwe ==
Armoured fighting vehicles produced in Rhodesia and Zimbabwe

=== Infantry fighting vehicles ===
- Bullet
- Gazelle
- Mine Protected Combat Vehicle

=== Armoured personnel carriers ===
- Crocodile
- Leopard
- MAP-45
- MAP-75
- Pig

=== Mine detection vehicles ===
- Pookie

== See also ==
- List of World War I armoured fighting vehicles
- List of armoured fighting vehicles of World War II
- List of modern armoured fighting vehicles
- List of artillery
- List of tanks
- List of Soviet tanks
- Tank
- History of the tank
- List of "M" series military vehicles
- List of main battle tanks by country
- Military equipment of Axis Power forces in Balkans and Russian Front
