= DELGA =

DELGA may refer to:

- Democrats for Lesbian & Gay Action, an earlier name of LGBT+ Liberal Democrats, a group within the Liberal Democrats British political party
- DELGA-1, a Georgian light assault vehicle for special operations forces designed in 2002
- Carole Delga (born 1971), president of the French Occitania administrative region
- Dalga, a town of about 120,000 people in Minya Governorate in Egypt
