= Cockerill i-X =

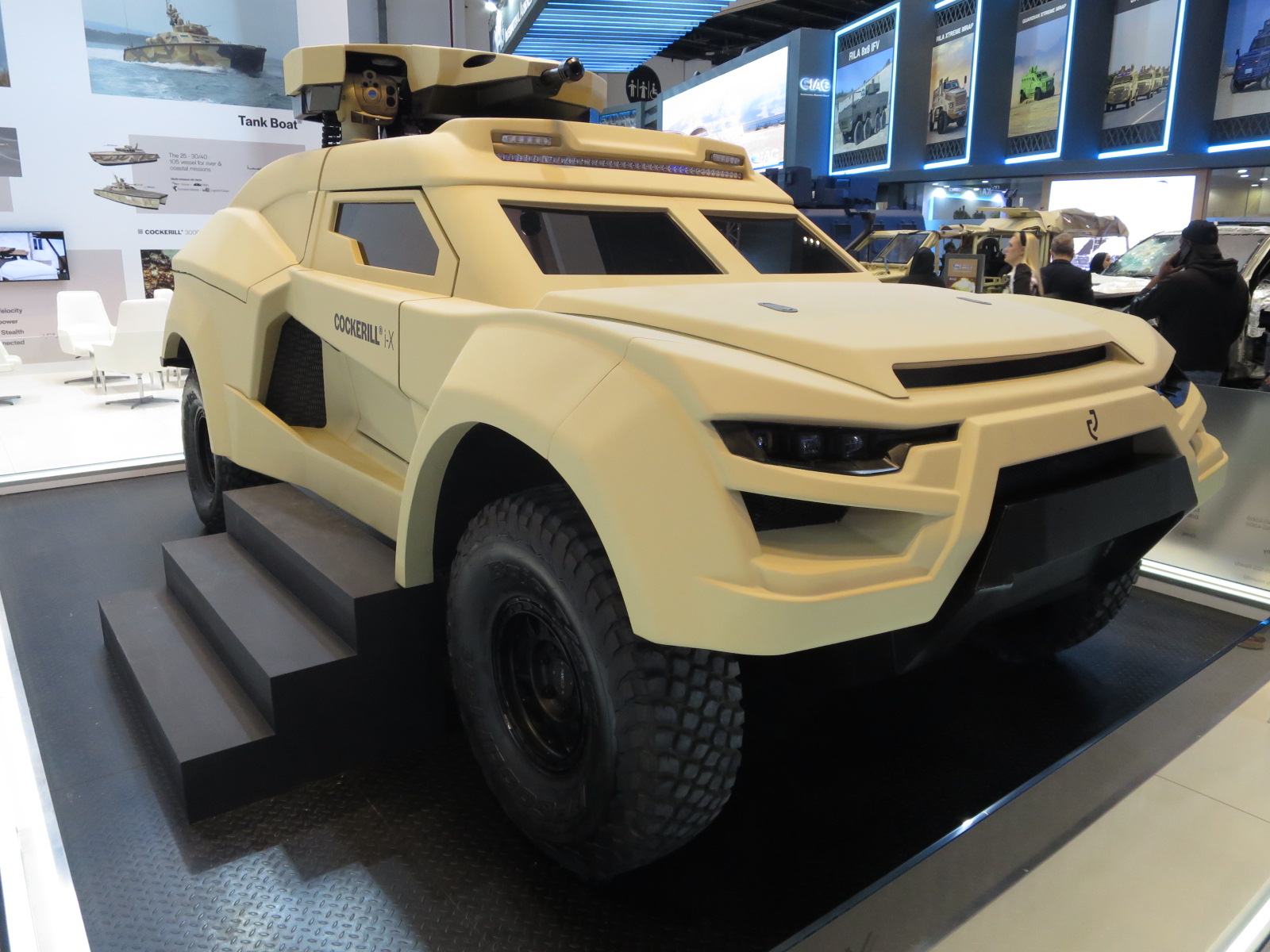
- Cockerill i-X at IDEX 2023
- Type: Armoured vehicle
- Place of origin: Belgium

Service history
- Used by: See Operators

Production history
- Manufacturer: Cockerill
- Produced: 2022–present

Specifications
- Mass: 3.5 tonnes
- Armor: STANAG 4569 Level 2
- Main armament: 25/30mm autocannon 2-4 ATGMs
- Secondary armament: 7.62mm medium machine gun 12.7mm heavy machine gun
- Engine: 750/800hp
- Suspension: 4x4
- Operational range: 600km
- Maximum speed: 200 km/h

The Cockerill i-X (interceptor and X for “modular-multi-weapons system) is an armoured fighting vehicle manufactured by the Belgian company John Cockerill. The 4x4 vehicle has stealth capability.

The Cockerill i-X is a land stealth ground vehicle that can use various weapon platforms ranging from 25/30mm autocannons to missiles etc. The vehicle has a modified IR signature. It is also rigged up with onboard AI, smart helmet issued to driver/crew to operate in conjunction with cameras/night vision/thermal imagers, LWS and various detection/recon/tracking devices.

The i-X was publicly unveiled at the inaugural World Defense Show in Riyadh, Saudi Arabia in March 2022.

On 21 February 2023 at the International Defence Exhibition in Abu Dhabi, Cockerill and Nimr announced a teaming agreement to collaborate on bringing the i-X to market. A teaming agreement is an interim agreement between partners which commits them to their roles during the development and marketing stage of a project. It would generally be transformed into a formal sub-contracting agreement once an order for delivery has been placed.

In May 2023 and in the second half of the year, the Technical Section of the French Army conducted evaluations of the Cockerill i-X in France, that the company qualified as positive. At the end of 2023, it was reported that the interceptor vehicle was presented to the Belgian army at the John Cockerill Group headquarters in Belgium.

== See also ==
- List of armoured fighting vehicles by country
