= TRT-25 remote weapon station =

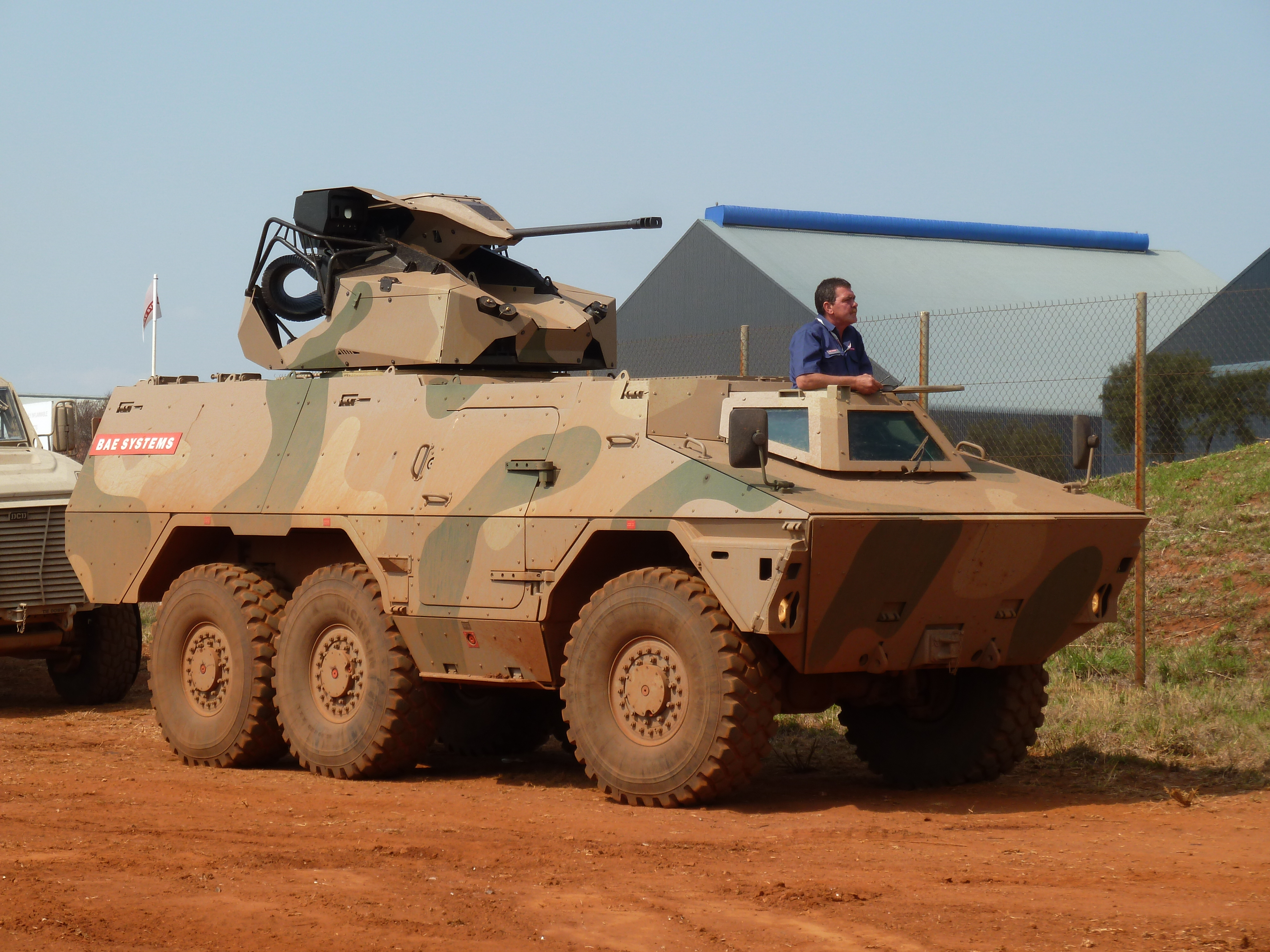
- A TRT-25 remote weapon station fitted on a Ratel IFV of the South African National Defence Force
- Type: Auto-cannon
- Place of origin: South Africa

Production history
- Designer: BAE Systems Land Systems South Africa

Specifications
- Mass: 1,870 lb/850 kg (with ammunition)
- Length: 605 mm
- Height: 1.05 metres
- Crew: 1
- Cartridge: 25×137 mm
- Caliber: 25mm
- Rate of fire: Cyclic: 200 rounds per minute
- Muzzle velocity: 1,100 metres per second (3,600 ft/s)
- Effective firing range: 3,000 metres (9,800 ft)
- Maximum firing range: 6,800 metres (22,300 ft)
- Feed system: dual 130-round bins,
- Sights: colour CCD camera/thermal nightsight

The TRT-25 is a Remote weapon station (RWS) made by BAE Systems Land Systems South Africa incorporating a M242 Bushmaster 25 mm (25×137mm) autocannon. The turret is designed as a self-protection and fire support weapon for Light Armoured Vehicles (LAV), Medium Mine Protected Vehicles (MMPV) and Infantry Combat Vehicles (ICV). Launched at Eurosatory in Paris in June 2010 when the turret was displayed for the first time on the Company’s new RG41 vehicle. It was described as "A low cost solution for both offensive and defensive situations, with simple-to-use operator interface and suitable for almost any encounter,” by Dennis Morris, president of BAE Systems Global Tactical Systems.

== Design ==
The system is flexible enough to accept a number of other weapons, from 20 mm calibre up to the 30 mm Hughes M230 Chain Gun or the Mk44 Bushmaster, (with a larger cradle). A co-axial 7.62mm machinegun is mounted for close fire support and four smoke grenade launchers for vehicle screening.

Sights

The sight is gyrostabilized, to enable engagement on the move and fitted with a laser range finder. The sights has an automatic target tracking, once manual lock-on has been achieved with the electro-optical gunner sight. The weapon is operated by with a Nintendo Style control pad and the range finder has a range in excess of 12 km.

Vehicle Trials

The turret is being trialled on the RG-41 and the RG-34, South African armoured fighting vehicles developed by Land Systems OMC, a subsidiary of BAE Systems. It has also been mated successfully to a Russian BMP-1.
