= Sarir (armoured personnel carrier) =

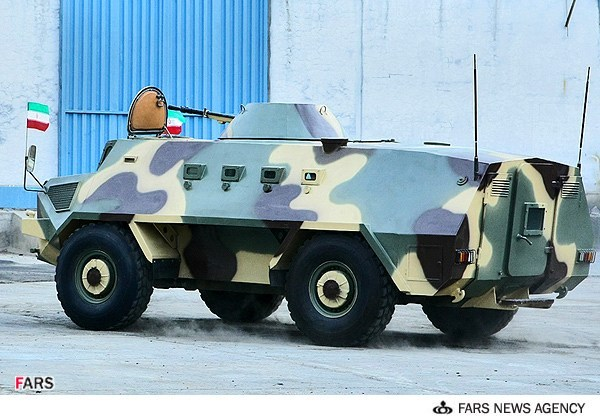
- Sarir APC
- Type: Armoured personnel carrier
- Place of origin: Iran

Service history
- Used by: IRGC

Production history
- Manufacturer: Defense Industries Organization (Iran)

Specifications
- Crew: 2 (+8 passengers)
- Armor: Welded steel
- Main armament: 14.5 mm KPVT heavy machine gun
- Secondary armament: Small arms
- Engine: diesel
- Suspension: 4x4

Sarir or Tala'iye is an Iranian 4x4 cross-country armoured personnel carrier developed and produced by DIO's Shahid Kolah Dooz industrial complex. This APC is developed specifically for IRGC. It was unveiled in early 2012 during IRGC's "Shohadaye Vahdat" (Martyrs of unity) wargames.

The APC's main armament is a 14.5 mm KPV heavy machine gun machine gun with a turret similar to Russian BTR series. Like Rakhsh, engine in situated in the front of the vehicle that provides more room for troops inside. It uses different kinds of domestic communication systems to be connected to the command stations and two large antennas are installed to the back. Troop compartment is in the middle of vehicle and is accessed only by 2 doors in the rear. Armor is said to be welded steel which protects from 12.7 mm machine guns. Troops can fire their weapons from 8 small firing ports in the sides.

A list of Iranian military vehicles published in 2020 described the Sarir/Tala'iye as a prototype that did not enter mass production.

== Operators ==
- Iran - IRGC

== See also ==
- Military of Iran
- Iranian military industry
- Equipment of the Iranian army
