= Aligator 4x4 =

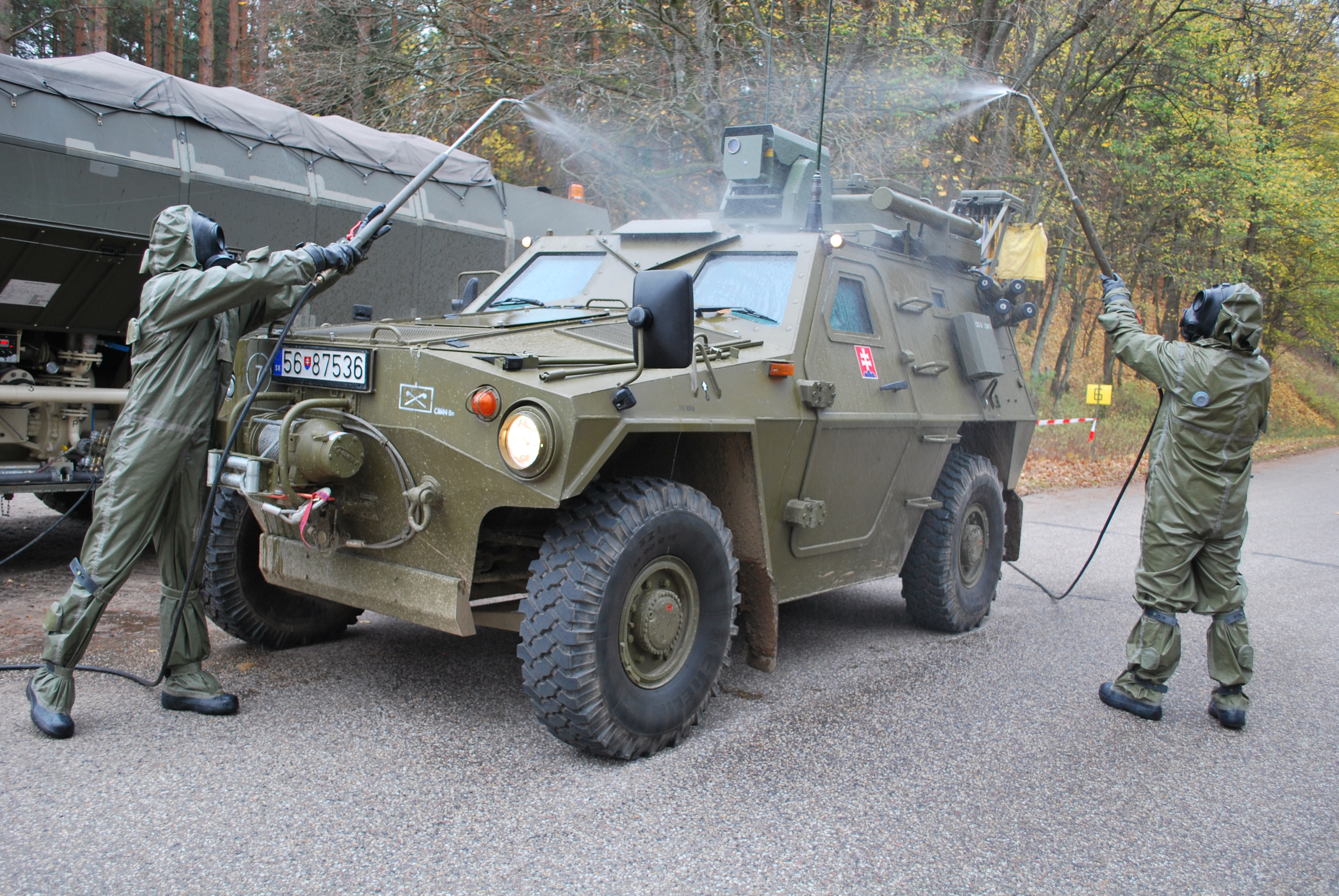
- Aligator 4x4 during CBRN defense training at the Steadfast Jazz 2013 military exercise
- Type: Multirole armored car
- Place of origin: Slovakia

Service history
- In service: Slovak Armed Forces; Slovak Police Force

Production history
- Designer: Transmisie a.s. Kerametal
- Designed: 1994–1997
- Manufacturer: ZTE TEES; Kerametal
- Produced: Prototype: 1997; Serial: 1998–2008
- No. built: 44

Specifications
- Mass: 6.7 t
- Length: 4.34 m
- Width: 2.28 m
- Height: 2.3 m
- Crew: 4
- Armor: Steel and ceramic cladding
- Engine: Diesel, six-cylinder, turbocharged, direct injection 146kW at 2300 RPM, volume 7146 ccm
- Transmission: 6-speed, automatic, with integrated retarder
- Suspension: 4x4
- Fuel capacity: 22-30 L / 100km
- Operational range: 600 km (minimum)
- Maximum speed: 120 km/h 5.5 to 7 km/h (amph. mode)

The Aligator 4x4 (Slovak: Aligátor, Slovak for alligator) is a Slovak type of all-terrain, off-road, lightly armoured, amphibious armored car, capable of carrying a crew of four. The vehicle is operated by the Ground Forces of the Slovak Republic, the land army of the Slovak Armed Forces, as well as some law enforcement agencies of the Slovak Police Force.

== Production ==
The development of the Aligator 4x4 began after 1994. It was overseen primarily by the companies Transmisie a.s. and ZTE TEES in Martin, Slovakia, and by Kerametal, the latter of which provided the composite ceramic cladding for the vehicle's metal-ceramic armor. The original expectations of the armed forces were for 250 specimens of the newly designed vehicle, but later in the 1990s, this number was lowered to half of the projected number.

The vehicle was first publicly presented on 30 April 1997 in field trials at Jasenská dolina, Slovakia, and later that same year at the defence industry expo IDET '97.

The Aligator 4x4 is an all-terrain vehicle that is amphibious in water, equipped with a small propeller system that allows it to ford rivers and lakes, without submersion capability. The vehicle's standard equipment includes an air-tight enclosed crew cabin with ventilation, thermal heating of the cabin, daytime observation equipment, night vision equipment, communication equipment, and the amphibious propulsion system.

The vehicle is lightly armored (utilising steel armor with composite ceramic cladding) and can withstand small arms fire, but is vulnerable to anti-tank weaponry missiles and anti-armor mines. Most variants are not armed with a weapon system by default. The vehicle also has the capability for crew control of vehicle-mounted weapons remotely from the crew cabin (this was used and tested in several development variants). Due to its small size, the vehicle is also easily deployable by a heavier transport plane or heavier transport helicopter. The Michelin-provided tires are meant to withstand lighter small arms fire.

The Aligator 4x4 Master is a prototype modernized variant and upgrade of the vehicle, developed in the 2000s. In the mid-2000s, both the Slovak government and the Slovak Armed Forces started downsizing their need for more vehicles produced, with interest shifting to MRAP and IMV vehicles manufactured in other countries.

The Aligator 4x4 project was gradually wound down in 2007 and 2008, after an overall investment of 210 million Slovak crowns. The vehicle is no longer in production.

== Service ==
Just over 40 Aligator 4x4 vehicles (a total of 44) were produced for the Slovak Armed Forces since the late 1990s, delivered throughout the 2000s. Due to their more limited protection against mines and improvised explosive devices (IEDs) and their lacking protection against anti-tank missiles, they were only used domestically in Slovakia and for the Slovak peacekeeping missions in Bosnia and Kosovo.

Though the Aligator 4x4 introduced several innovative systems for effective crew protection from chemical weapon hazards, the vehicle was considered largely unsuccessful, mainly due to its more vulnerable armor and some of its older engine issues. Though the tires of the Aligator 4x4 were meant to withstand small arms fire and be functional even after partial deflation, a flat tire issue on an Aligator in 2007 caused a car accident between the vehicle and a truck.

== Variants ==
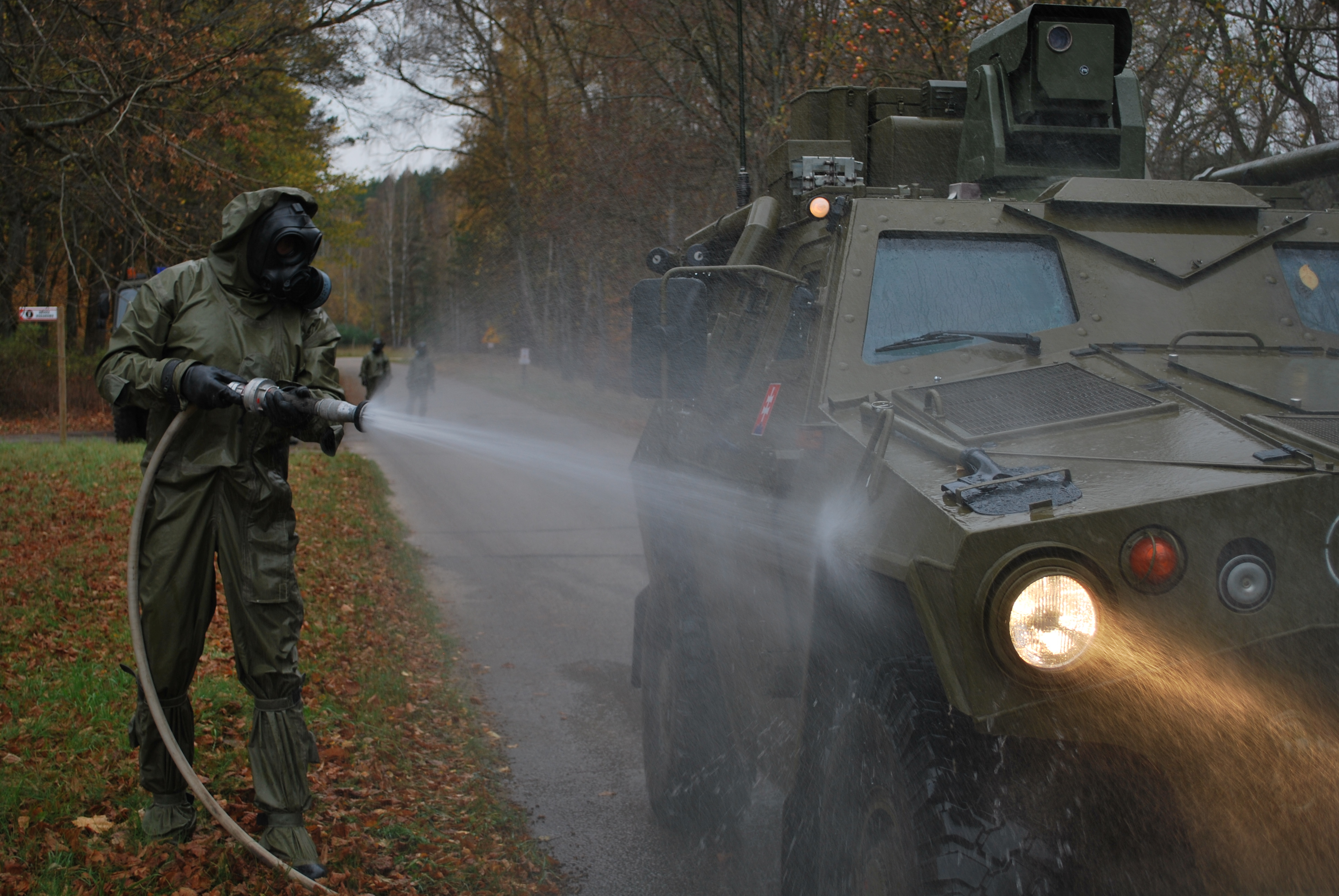
Aligator 4x4 (likely the RCHBO variant) during CBRN defense training at the international military exercise Steadfast Jazz 2013

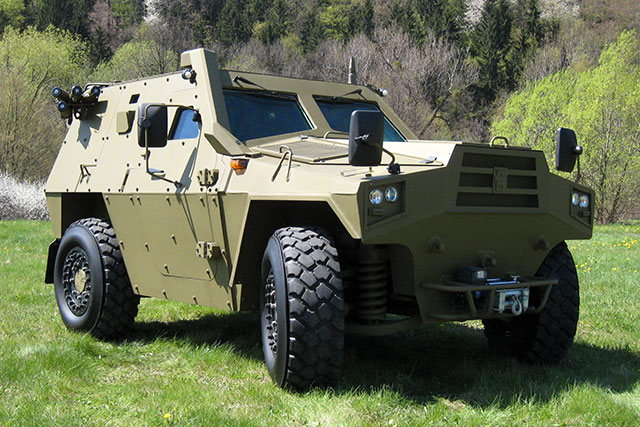
Aligator 4x4 Master (modernized variant prototype, mid-to-late 2000s)

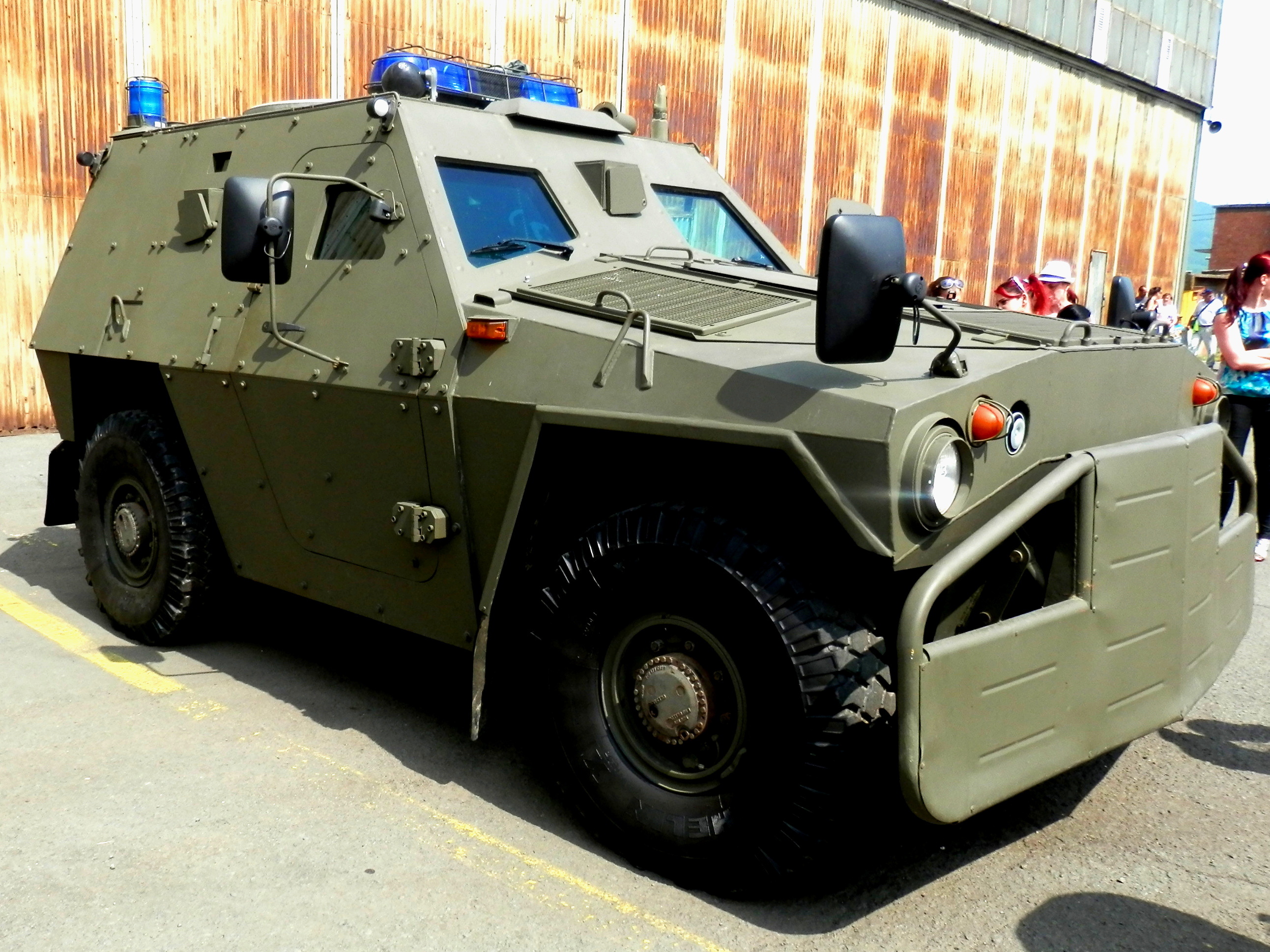
Police version of the Aligator 4x4 Master updated variant, June 2019

- Aligator 4x4 PCM" - production variant. The police version, a light armored vehicle with equipment specialised for law enforcement instead of military use.
- Aligator 4x4 PV" (Slovak: Prieskumné vozidlo, "Reconnaissance vehicle") - production variant. A light armored surface-amphibious vehicle, intended as the main military variant for use in the armed forces.
- "Aligator 4x4 PVS" (Slovak: Pohyblivé veliteľské stanovište, "Mobile command position") - production variant. A command version of the vehicle, derived from the standard reconnaissance variant.
- "Aligator 4x4 DPP" (Slovak: Delostrelecká pohyblivá pozorovateľňa, "Mobile observation post for artillery") - production variant. A reconnaissance version tailored to forward spotting and artillery guidance.
- "Aligator 4x4 ŽV" (Slovak: Ženijné vozidlo, "Engineering vehicle") - production variant. An engineering version of the vehicle, derived from the standard reconnaissance variant.
- "Aligator 4x4 RCHBO" (Slovak: Radiačná, chemická a biologická ochrana, "Radiation, chemical and biological protection") - production variant. A specialised version of the vehicle, purposefully designed to operate in high-risk hazardous environments affected by radiation, chemical and biological weapons.
- "Aligator 4x4 PPS" (Slovak: Pozorovacie prieskumné stanovište, "Observation reconnaissance position") - development prototype only. A reconnaissance version equipped with a MOWAG-produced MBK-2 turret, containing magnification equipment, a thermal camera and a MAG machine gun operated from inside the vehicle.
- "Aligator 4x4 PLN" (Slovak: Predsunutý letecký navádzač, "*Forward air controller's vehicle") - development prototype only. A vehicle used for air support communications and guidance on the battlefield. Somewhat comparable to the serially produced DPP variant.
- "Aligator 4x4 Mini-Samson" - development prototype only. The most heavily armed version of the vehicle, equipped with a Rafael Mini-Samson turret that contains a SADS system and multi-purpose Spike rocket launcher, all controlled from within the vehicle.
- "Aligator 6x6" - development concept only. A six-wheeled and somewhat more spacious version of the vehicle, for tasks comparable to that of an infantry mobility vehicle, medevac field ambulance and similar.
- "Aligator 4x4 Master" - development prototype only. An improved and modernized variant of the original Aligator 4x4, created in the 2000s, intended to be used as a tactical combat vehicle.

Armament loadout specific and equipment loadout specific variants of the vehicle include a PLRS Igla missile system vehicle, an anti-tank guided missile launching vehicle, a grenade launcher equipped vehicle, a 12.7 machine gun vehicle, a radiolocation vehicle, a field ambulance vehicle, and a mortar towing vehicle.

== Successor ==
The planned successor model to the original Aligator 4x4 and Aligator 4x4 Master is the Kerametal Aligator Master II, first presented at the IDEB defence expo in Bratislava in May 2016. The successor is a complete overhaul of the original vehicle's concept, enlarged in size, capable of carrying nine people (including crew) and profiled as a dedicated infantry mobility vehicle and MRAP.

Unlike the original Aligator, which was developed mainly for the needs of the Slovak Armed Forces, the Aligator 4x4 Master II is also meant for export sales to a number of foreign countries. Kerametal, one of the original developers of the Aligator 4x4, took over the initial development of the new Aligator 4x4 Master II vehicle, but was criticised for introducing the new model several years late, in an already far more competitive market for IMV and MRAP military vehicles. The Aligator 4x4 Master II is available in two basic versions, a surface-amphibious version and a standard version.

== See also ==
- Tatrapan - Multi-purpose armoured truck on 6x6 chassis derived from Tatra 815 heavy truck, used by the Slovak Armed Forces in several variants, including as an armored personnel carrier.
- List of armoured fighting vehicles by country
