= Chaiseri Jackal =

Jackal
- Type: Reconnaissance vehicle
- Place of origin: Thailand

Service history
- Wars: 2025 Cambodian–Thai border crisis

Production history
- Manufacturer: Chaiseri
- Produced: 2025 – present

Specifications
- Mass: 5.2 tonnes
- Length: 5.0 metres
- Width: 2.27 metres
- Height: 2.2 metres
- Armor: STANAG 4569 Level 1
- Main armament: 12.7mm RCWS
- Engine: 228 hp
- Payload capacity: 1250 kg
- Suspension: 4×4
- Operational range: 600 km
- Maximum speed: 130 km/h

The Jackal is a Thailand armoured vehicle designed and manufactured by Chaiseri. It is a 4x4 light high-mobility armoured tactical vehicle intended for reconnaissance, convoy escort, command and control, border patrol and fire-support mission. Designed with the agility and simple operational method, the vehicle suitable for high mobility, rapid deployment and lower cost operation.

== History ==
Launched by Chaiseri at Defense & Security exhibition in November 2025, the Jackal has owned a battle proven recognition in Royal Thai Army service. In 2025 Cambodian–Thai border crisis, Jackal was uses to support Royal Thai Army drone operators in reconnaissance mission.

== Design ==
The vehicle mass is 5.2 tonnes and has a length of 5.0 metres. Powered by one 228 hp engine, it can reach top speed of 130 km/h in the operational range of 600 kilometers. The protection of the hull is constructed with the STANAG 4569 Level 1 ballistic protection. For the armament, Jackal can be equipped with remote weapon stations (RWS) either 7.62mm or 12.7 mm machine gun.

== Operators ==
- Malaysia: Malaysian Army
- Thailand: Royal Thai Army
