= Sedena-Henschel HWK-11 =

Mexican and West German military vehicle

Sedena - Henschel HWK-11
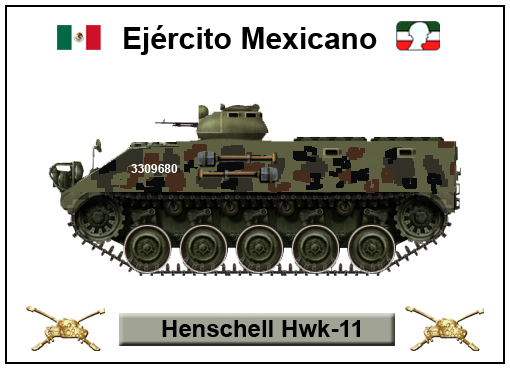
- A HWK-11 IFV
- Type: Infantry fighting vehicle (Second Version) armoured personnel carrier (First and Third Version)
- Place of origin: Mexico West Germany

Service history
- In service: 1965–present
- Used by: Mexico

Production history
- Designer: Henschel SEDENA
- Designed: 1962
- Manufacturer: Henschel Wehrtechnik GmbH SEDENA
- No. built: 52+

Specifications
- Mass: 11 tonnes
- Length: 5.05 m
- Width: 2.53 m
- Height: 1.59 m (without turret)
- Crew: 2+10
- Armor: Welded steel armour from 5 mm - 15 mm
- Main armament: 7.62 mm machine gun on French CALF turret
- Engine: Before 1993, 6V-53 Detroit Diesel developing 210 hp (current engine and power unknown)
- Transmission: Allison TX-100 automatic transmission
- Suspension: Torsion bar
- Fuel capacity: 356 Liters
- Operational range: 400 km
- Maximum speed: Before 1993, 70 km/h (current top-speed unknown)

The Sedena Henschel HWK-11 was a joint project between the Mexican Secretariat of National Defense (SEDENA) and Henschel Wehrtechnik GmbH of West Germany.

== Development ==
The HWK-11 came about at the request from the Mexican defense secretary for a new tracked armored troop carrying vehicle for the Mexican army. The HWK was mainly German designed although Mexico had some input in the design process in the form that Mexico set certain requirements and specifications for the vehicle and Mexico also designed the basic configuration of the hull.

== Production ==
In 1964 the first 12 vehicles were manufactured in West Germany and delivered to the Mexican Army while facilities were set up in Mexico to manufacture the vehicle locally. Initially 350 HWK-11s in multiple variants were to be manufactured for the Mexican military but the entire order was not completed. At least 40 vehicles were produced but the exact total number of vehicles produced has not been disclosed by the Mexican military.

== Specifications ==
=== First Version - 1965 ===
The first versions of the HWK-11 were strictly troop transport vehicles with only a single turret mounted 7.62 MG3 machine gun that could be fired from within the vehicle. This initial version featured a 180 hp engine and a two image intensifiers, one for the driver and one for the machine gun operator.

=== Second Version - 1980 ===
In 1980 one vehicle was used to test the use of a one-man Helio FVT900 turret with a 20 mm cannon and a coaxial 7.62 mm machine gun. The upgrade also included the upgrading of the vehicles engine to the 6V-53 Detroit Diesel which produced 210 hp and allowed the vehicle to reach up to 70 km/h.

=== Third Version - 1993 ===
In 1993 the vehicle was upgraded one more time, given a more powerful engine (the type of which is unknown) and new German made M113 caterpillar road wheels. The most significant upgrade to this new version is the addition of a French design fully enclosed turret mounting a 7.62 mm machine gun. Finish 1993

=== Medium tank ===
A medium tank variant was produced in small quantities to be utilized as an infantry fire support vehicle. It features French designed turret mounting a 90mm gun borrowed from the Panhard ERC90 and a night vision system. The engine type fielded has not been publicly disclosed.

== Comparable Vehicles ==
- German Schützenpanzer Marder
- Soviet BMP-1
- United States M113 armored personnel carrier
- British FV432
