= BA-5 =

BA-5 may refer to:

== Medicine ==
- the lineage BA.5 of the SARS-CoV-2 Omicron virus variant

== Aircraft ==
- BAaer BA-5 Gurí, an Argentine ultra-light aircraft
- BA-5, a Chinese unmanned target drone conversion of the Soviet Mikoyan-Gurevich MiG-15bis single-seat fighter
- Bell XLR-81-BA-5, a cancelled American rocket engine
