= RG41 =

- Type: Armored fighting vehicle (AFV)
- Place of origin: South Africa

Production history
- Designer: Land Systems OMC
- Designed: 2008
- Manufacturer: BAE Systems Land Systems South Africa
- Produced: 2010

Specifications
- Mass: 19.00 tonnes
- Length: 7.78 metres (25.5 ft)
- Width: 2.8 metres (9 ft 2 in)
- Height: 2.58 metres (8 ft 6 in)
- Crew: 11
- Main armament: various
- Engine: Deutz 2015TCD V6; 390 kilowatts (520 hp)
- Payload capacity: 11,000 kilograms (24,000 lb)
- Transmission: ZF 5HP 902
- Ground clearance: 440 millimetres (17 in)
- Maximum speed: 100 kilometres per hour (62 mph)

RG41, is a South African 8×8 armored fighting vehicle (AFV) with mine resistant protection developed by Land Systems OMC, a subsidiary of BAE Systems. The RG41 was designed as an affordable modern AFV can be utilized in a variety of roles, including infantry section vehicle, a command vehicle, an ambulance, recovery vehicle and engineer vehicle. Its large payload capability allows additional armour to be added to the RG41 and a variety of weapon systems such as the Alliant Techsystems's 25mm M242 Bushmaster mounted in a tactical response turret, the TRT-25 remote weapon station (RWS).

== History ==
Land Systems OMC, a subdivision of BAE Systems in South Africa, began development of the RG41 in early 2008 as a private venture after seeing a need for an affordable combat system. To meet this requirement, the RG41 employs an ITAR (International Tariff in Arms Regulation) free design and consists of commercial off-the-shelf (COTS) components that are not subject to US International Traffic in Arms Regulations.

== Specifications ==
The RG41 is an AFV where the driver is seated alone in the front left side of the vehicle. Some weapons can be added to it, including a 25 or 30 mm cannon. At the Africa Aerospace and Defense Conference 2018, a RG41 was fitted with a turret armed with a 30 x 173 cannon and a co axial 7.62 mm.

With a GVW of around 30 tonnes, this vehicle easily stays mobile thanks to its 8×8 capabilities.
