= Aqareb =

Iranian armored fighting vehicle

Aghareb Tank Destroyer آقارب
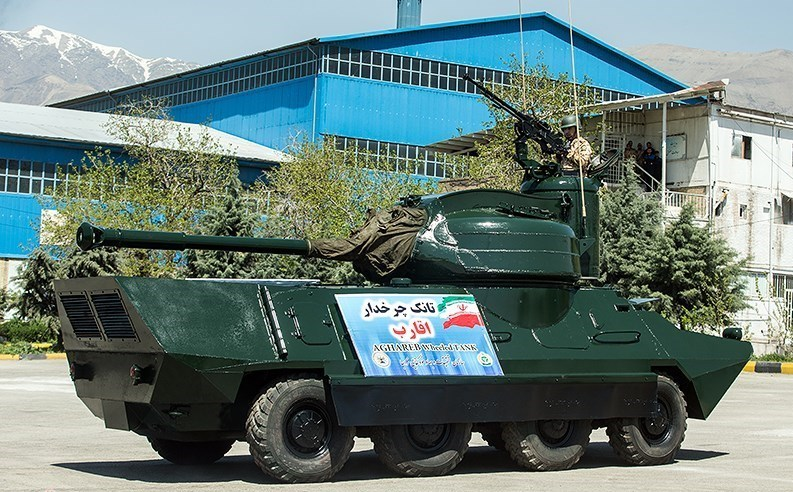
- Aghareb Tank Destroyer
- Type: Armored fighting vehicle
- Place of origin: Iran

Service history
- In service: 2015-Present
- Used by: Iran

Production history
- Manufacturer: Defense Industries Organization
- Produced: 2015-Unknown
- No. built: 20

Specifications
- Mass: 12,500 Kg (14 tons; 27,548 lb)
- Length: 9.3 meters (30.51 ft) overall, 7.6 meters (24.93 ft) hull
- Crew: 4
- Armor: Welded steel
- Main armament: 1 x 90 mm gun
- Secondary armament: 7.62 mm coaxial machine gun, 12.7 mm heavy machine gun
- Engine: Diesel engine
- Suspension: Wheeled 8×8
- Operational range: 500 km (311 miles)
- Maximum speed: 80 kilometers per hour (50 miles per hour)

The Aghareb (Persian: آقارب) is an Iranian designed and built eight-wheel drive armored fighting vehicle (AFV). The Iranian armed forces categorizes the vehicle as a wheeled fire support system with inherent battlefield reconnaissance functionality. The Aqareb is based upon the chassis of the Soviet BTR-60PB. The vehicle was unveiled on the 15th of April 2015 by the then commander of the Iranian Army’s Ground Forces Brigadier General Ahmad Reza Pourdastan.

== Description ==
The Aqareb is an Iranian development of the Soviet BTR-60PB, which the Iranian government received in 1986 from the Soviet Union. The Iranian armed forces categorizes the vehicle as a wheeled fire support system with inherent battlefield reconnaissance functionality.

It is based upon the chassis of the BTR-60PB, with the suspension raised to increase the ground clearance of the vehicle. It has a diesel-fueled engine, of unknown horsepower, with an eight-wheeled transmission. Four large road wheels are situated on either sides of the hull providing the vehicle with off-road capabilities. It has been modified to carry a standard crew of four, compared to the BTR-60PB which carries three. The Aqareb crew of four includes commander, driver, gunner and loader. The crew resides in the front and middle sections of the vehicle with the powerpack located at the rear of the chassis, like the original BTR-60PB, but with two prominent exhaust grills located at the rear.

=== Armor ===
The front hull of the Aqareb is longer and is made of all-welded steel armor which provides protection against light arms and shell splinters. The front of the hull has two small windows which can be covered by a flap hinged at the top. The glacis plate and nose section have been modified for better ballistics protection. An armored plate is welded onto the upper reaches of the wheels which protects the suspension.

=== Armaments ===
The primary armament of the vehicle is a 90mm caliber cannon in a 360 degree traversing power assisted turret mounted on the top of the hull which is equipped with a modernized fire control system.

The secondary armaments of the vehicle include a 12.7 mm heavy machine gun, mounted on a cylindrical outcropping located at the rear of the turret, and a 7.62 mm coaxial machine gun.
