= Vextra =

French armored reconnaissance vehicle

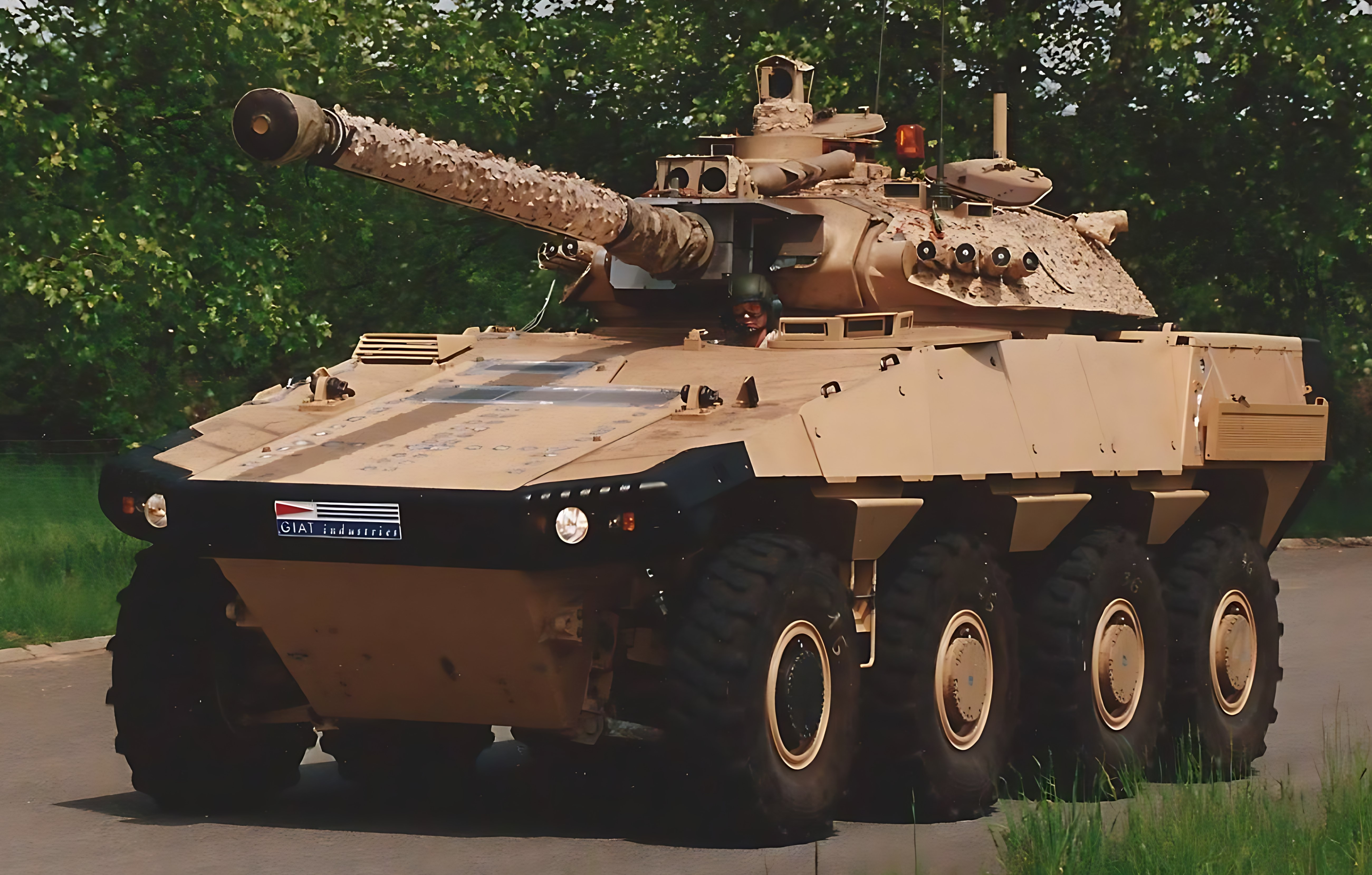
- Place of origin: France

Service history
- In service: No

Production history
- Manufacturer: GIAT Industries

Specifications
- Mass: 28 t (62,000 lb)
- Length: 7.4 m (24 ft)
- Width: 3 m (9.8 ft)
- Height: 2 m (6.6 ft)
- Crew: 4
- Passengers: 8
- Armor: Aluminum
- Main armament: 105mm gun 120mm gun 25mm autocannon
- Secondary armament: 7.62mm machine gun, coaxial
- Engine: Saab-Scania diesel 522 kW (700 hp)
- Drive: 8×8
- Operational range: 800 km (500 mi), road
- Maximum speed: 120 km/h (75 mph), road

The GIAT Vextra is a prototype French armored vehicle, developed in the early 1990s by GIAT industries, now Nexter Systems, revealed in 1997. It is crewed by a four-person crew, including commander, driver, gunner, and loader.

== Description ==
The Vextra was classified as an armored reconnaissance vehicle, fire support vehicle, and/or anti-tank vehicle. The Vextra was based on multiple preceding French armored vehicles of similar type. Aluminum armor was used to keep the tank as light as possible (weight was 28t - 33t depending on level of ballistic protection) which was also used on the AMX-10P IFV, an armored vehicle produced starting in 1973. The Vextra is also a wheeled vehicle, with an 8×8 chassis based on the Vextra IFV, a very similar prototype vehicle with the Dragar one-man turret and a 25mm gun. The Vextra was aimed at both the French Army and export customers, but after some successful trials in France, and many successful firepower tests in the United Arab Emirates, the vehicle still received no production orders.

The Vextra was equipped with a GIAT TLM 105mm three-man turret, armed with a GIAT G2 low-recoil 105mm gun. The gun is compatible with NATO-standard 105×617mmR ammunition, including armor-piercing fin-stabilized discarding sabot (APFSDS) ammunition. The vehicle carries a total of 35 shells for the main armament, twelve of which are stowed in the turret. The Vextra is also equipped with two coaxially mounted 7.62mm machine guns and the Galix close defense system: four 80mm launchers on either side of the gun at front, and three on either side at the rear.

With 8 total wide-dimension tires, light aluminum armor, 700 hp Saab-Scania diesel engine, and hydropneumatic suspension, the Vextra can reach speeds of 120 km/h on road. The hydropneumatic suspension system uses large fluid filled spheres to internally compress, and absorb shock. This suspension system rather than one using springs makes for a smooth ride and allows the Vextra to traverse more difficult terrain.

== The FINDERS system ==
A version of the FINDERS (Fast Information, Navigation, Decision and Reporting System) is installed in the GIAT Vextra and on the Leclerc main battle tank. Developed by GIAT industries, the FINDERS system performs a variety of functions for their tanks, it displays a color map with positions of the host, allied, and hostile vehicle(s), designated targets, alphanumeric messages, many digital mapping options, communication options, and more.
