= DELGA-1 =

The DELGA-1 is a Georgian light assault vehicle for special operations forces designed by the research company STC Delta of the Ministry of Defence of Georgia.

The very first of these vehicles were handed over to georgian special forces in 2001 for field examination. The on a Russian Lada based combat/scout vehicle is very light and lacks armor which is common to vehicles of similar types. Armament can be fitted by choice. There is a total space for at least two machineguns and one additional automatic grenade launcher or an anti tank weapon.

Since the beginning of research, several 4x4 and 6x6 variants were developed. Some having additional transport capacity and armor plates to provide more protection for the crew and passengers. Development of the Delga family is ongoing.
