= Rakhsh (armoured personnel carrier) =

Iranian military transport vehicle

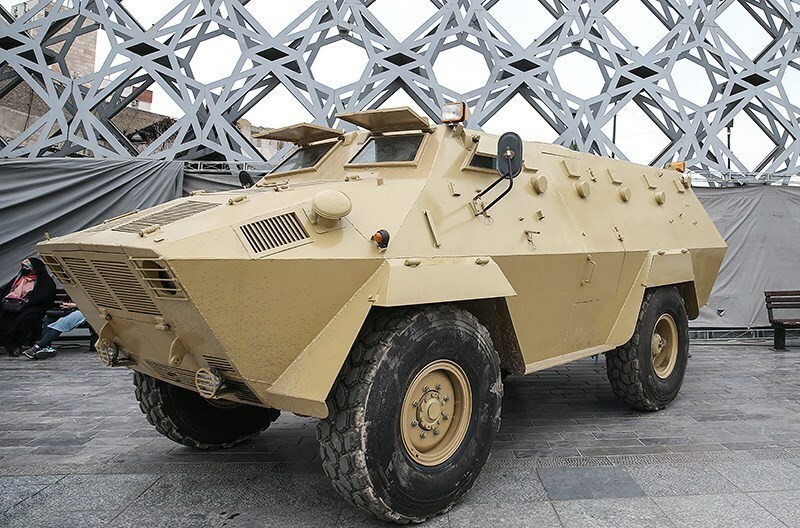
- Late version of the Rakhsh APC, 2022
- Type: Armoured personnel carrier
- Place of origin: Iran

Service history
- Used by: See Operators
- Wars: Second Sudanese Civil War; War in Darfur

Production history
- Manufacturer: Defense Industries Organization

Specifications
- Mass: 6.5 tonnes. 7.5 tonnes fully loaded
- Length: 6.06 m
- Width: 2.40 m
- Height: 2.43 m
- Crew: 2 (+8 passengers)
- Armor: Welded steel
- Main armament: 12.7 mm DShK 1938/46 heavy machine gun, 30 mm cannon or a twin 23 mm anti air cannon.
- Engine: DO 824LFL09 4-cylinder diesel engine 155 hp
- Power/weight: 23.8 hp/tonne
- Suspension: parabolic leaf spring with hydraulic shock absorber
- Maximum speed: 80 km/h (road)

The Rakhsh is a lightweight Iranian 4 × 4 cross-country armoured personnel carrier developed and produced by DIO's Shahid Kolah Dooz Industrial Complex and named after Rakhsh, the mythical horse of Rostam in Shahnama. It is probably based on a proven 4 × 4 cross-country chassis present in Iran before and is in service of Iranian Police, Iranian Army, IRGC and Sudan.

== History ==
It was first seen patrolling the Sudanese streets in 2005 before being unveiled by Iran officially in 2006.

Rakhsh was unveiled for the export market, but also entered service in the Iranian police and military. It is believed that about 20 of them are exported to Sudan as a contract signed in 2004. Deliveries started from 2005 and ended in 2006.

== Design ==
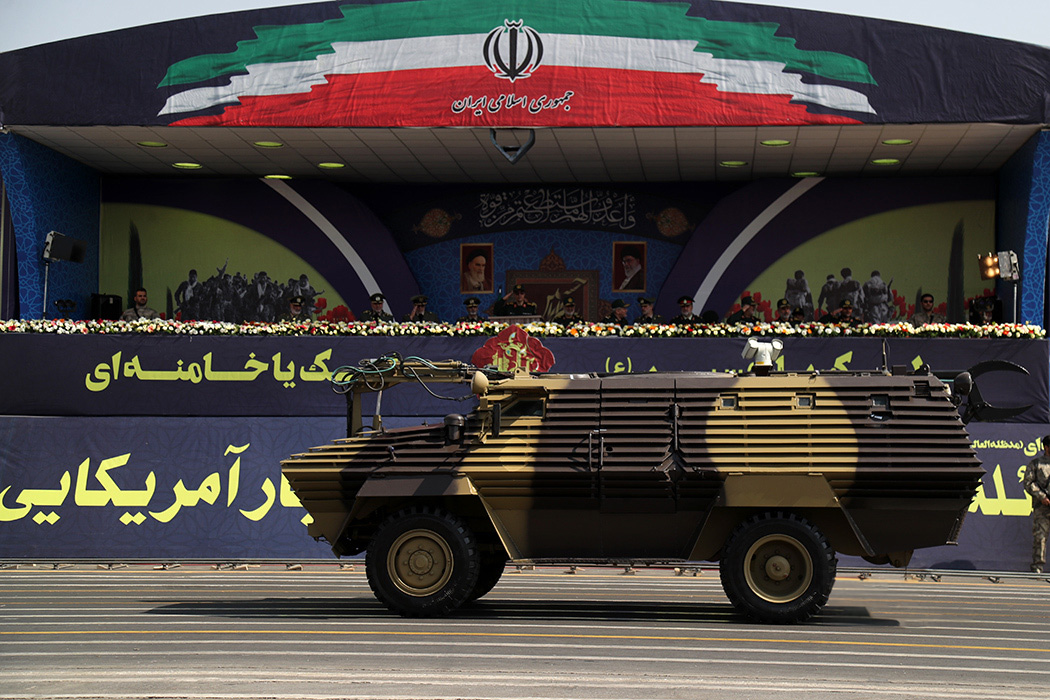
An early version of Rakhsh APC.

The hull is made of welded steel which can protect the occupants from 7.62 mm small arms. Driver's is in the frontal left part of the vehicle sided by the commander's. Both of these are protected by bulletproof glasses. In addition, 8 fully equipped troops can be carried by the rear compartment that also has small bulletproof windows and 10 associated firing ports that allows troops to fire their weapons from within the vehicle with some level of protection.

The crew can rapidly enter and leave the vehicle via a door in either side of the hull and twin doors in the hull rear.

It uses a DO 824LFL09 4-cylinder diesel engine with the output of 155 hp giving it a high speed of 80 km/h on road and excellent off-road mobility.

It comes in some different version. The most basic one has a 12.7 mm machine gun attached to the top of the hull with a rotatable mount similar to that of Boragh APC. Other versions are seen with ZU-23-2 23 mm anti air cannons or a 30 mm Autocannon similar to the ones used in Russian BMP-2.

Standard equipment for the Rakhsh includes a central tyre inflation system that allows the driver to adjust the tyre pressure to suit the terrain being crossed, tyres fitted with run flats, differential locks and a powered winch. As it will be deployed in high ambient temperatures an air conditioning system is fitted as standard.

As the Rakhsh has good cross-country mobility, it can be used for a wide range of battlefield missions as well as a baseline APC. It could also be modified for use as an internal security vehicle.

Also there are additional options for buyers such as banks of smoke grenade launchers, NBC system and additional ceramic armour. These are reported to increase the protection against 12.7 mm machine guns up to 14.5 mm.

== Operators ==
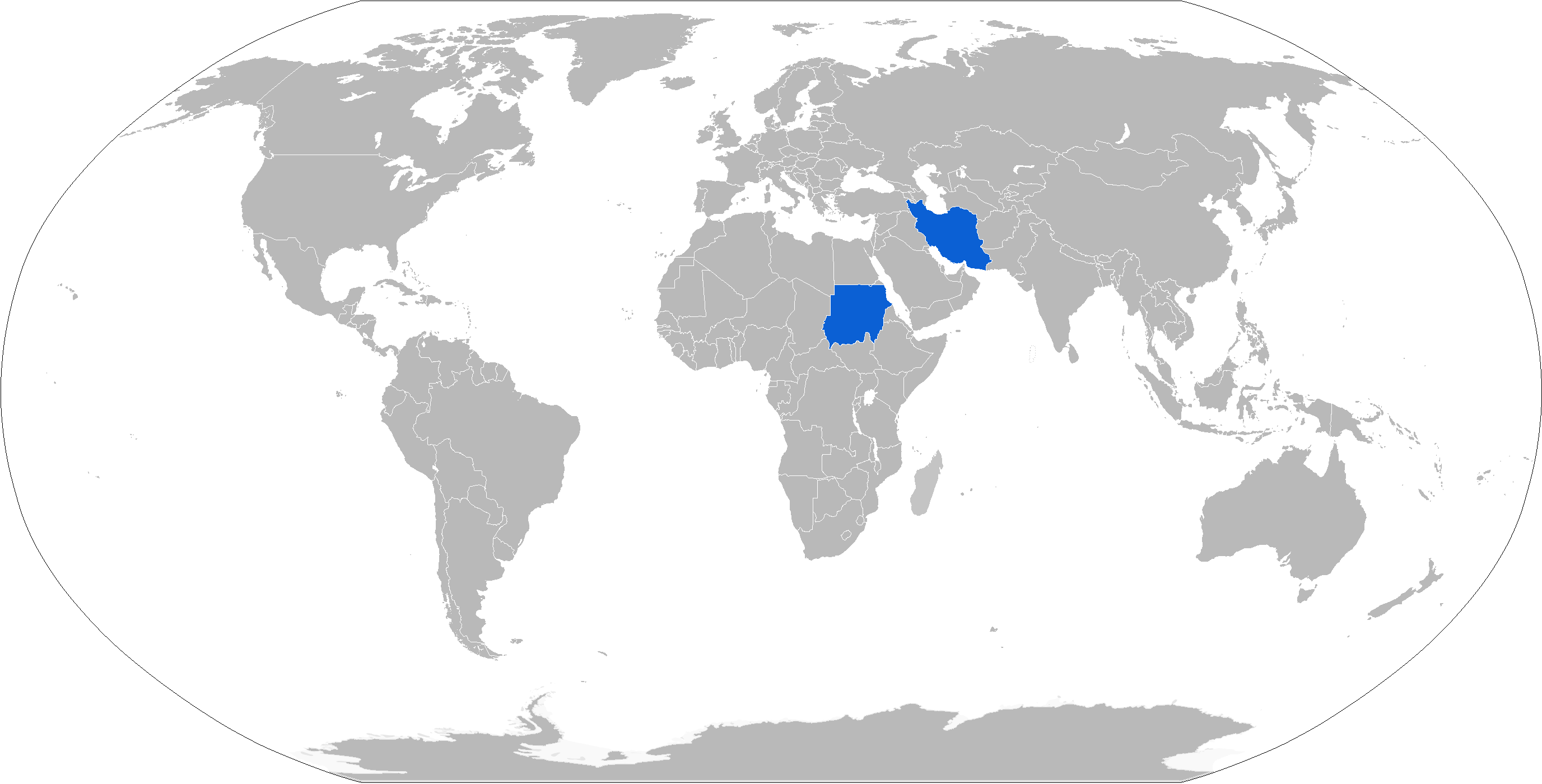
Map of Rakhsh operators in blue

- Iran
- Sudan
