= List of main battle tanks by country =

This is a list of countries that currently operate main battle tanks, in their military service. A main battle tank (MBT) is a type of tank that is armour-protected, direct fire and maneuver in many modern armies mechanized land force.

== Table of main battle tanks by country ==
=== A ===
Country	Type	Quantity (estimated)	Origin	Notes
Afghanistan	T-55	400	Soviet Union	Most either destroyed or scrapped during NATO occupation. Those that remain are now under Taliban control.
Afghanistan	T-62	260	Soviet Union	Most either destroyed or scrapped during NATO occupation. Those that remain are now under Taliban control.
Algeria	T-62	270	Soviet Union	
Algeria	T-64	300	Soviet Union	
Algeria	T-72	325	Soviet Union	
Algeria	T-90A	300	Soviet Union / Russia	
Angola	T-55	200	Soviet Union	
Angola	T-62	50	Soviet Union	
Angola	T-72	50	Soviet Union	
Argentina	Tanque Argentino Mediano (TAM)	231	Argentina West Germany	Chassis is based on Marder IFV
Armenia	T-62	14	Soviet Union	
Armenia	T-72	168	Soviet Union	
Armenia	T-90	1	Soviet Union	
Australia	M1 Abrams	75	United States	In 2022, Australia signed a contract to replace the 59 M1A1 AIM Abrams with 75 M1A2 SEPv3. 46 delivered as of late 2025.
Austria	Leopard 2A4	56	West Germany	Replaced the M60 A3 in 1997. Will be subject to a combat value increase in the near future.
Azerbaijan	T-90S	100	Soviet Union / Russia	
Azerbaijan	T-72 Aslan	420	Russia	
Azerbaijan	T-55	100	Soviet Union	

=== B ===
Country	Type	Quantity (estimated)	Origin	Notes
Bahrain	M60A3 Patton	180	United States	100 in active service with a further 80 in storage
Bahrain	M1A2 SEPv3	50	United States	Purchased in 2024
Bangladesh	Type 59 Durjoy	174	China / Bangladesh	174 Type 59 tanks were upgraded to Type 59 Durjoy
Bangladesh	Type 69	58	China	
Bangladesh	MBT-2000	44	China	
Bangladesh	VT-5	44 (on order)	China	Light tank
Belarus	T-72B	557	Soviet Union	
Belarus	T-72B3	20	RussiaSoviet Union	Modernized T-72B variant, brought up to T-90 operational standards
Bosnia and Herzegovina	M-84	71	Yugoslavia	
Bosnia and Herzegovina	AMX-30S	50	France	
Bosnia and Herzegovina	M60A3	85	United States	
Bosnia and Herzegovina	T-55	142	Soviet Union	
Brazil	EE-T1 Osório	2	Brazil	Two operational tanks with the Centro de Instrução de Blindados of the Brazilian Army
Brazil	M60A3 TTS	91	United States	Used for instruction
Brazil	Leopard 1A1	127	West Germany	
Brazil	Leopard 1A5	221	West Germany	Upgraded for ´´BR+´´ version
Bulgaria	T-72M1 Mod. 2022	90	Soviet Union	A number purchased and sold to Ukraine
Bulgaria	T-72	Unknown, estimated 130-250	Soviet Union	
Burundi	T-55	about 10	Soviet Union	

=== C ===
Country	Type	Quantity (estimated)	Origin	Notes
Cambodia	T-55	365	Soviet Union	
Cambodia	T-62	19	Soviet Union	
Cambodia	Type 59	74	Soviet Union / China	
Canada	Leopard 2A6M CAN	20	West Germany / Germany	20 Leopard 2A6M were leased from Germany in December 2007. The tanks were permanently transferred to Canadian service when tanks purchased from the Netherlands were transferred to Germany in exchange.
Canada	Leopard 2A4M CAN	20	West Germany / Germany	Upgraded from Dutch Leopard 2A4 in 2010, closer to 2A7+ armour configuration but with shorter barrel.
Canada	Leopard 2A4 CAN	34	West Germany	100 Dutch Leopard 2A4 initially purchased in 2007, and 15 more 2A4s were later purchased from Germany as "Logistic Stock Vehicles" exclusively for spare parts. 20 were upgraded to 2A4M CAN standard in 2010, 20 were upgraded to 2A7 standard and given to Germany in exchange for 2A6Ms, 18 converted into Wisent 2 "Ram" AEVs, leaving 42 Leopard 2A4 CAN in service by 2022. 8 were donated to Ukraine in 2023.
Cape Verde	T-55	12	Soviet Union	
Central African Republic	T-55	4	Soviet Union	
Chad	T-55	60	Soviet Union	
Chile	Leopard 2A4	172	West Germany	8 to be used as spares, upgrades for Leopard 2A5 in 2015
Chile	Leopard 1V	100	West Germany	
China	Type 99A	600	China	
China	Type 99	600	China	
China	Type 96	2,500	China	
China	Type 88	300	China	Reserve and training units. Retired from active service
China	Type 69/79	300	Soviet Union / China	Reserve and training units. Retired from active service
China	Type 59	30	Soviet Union / China	
Congo, Democratic Republic of	T-55	20	Soviet Union	
Congo, Republic of	Type 59	20	Soviet Union / China	
Croatia	Leopard 2A8	44	Germany	On order
Croatia	M-84A4 Sniper	45	Croatia	To be retired and donated to Ukraine once all Leopard 2A8s are delivered
Cuba	T-55	900	Soviet Union	
Cuba	T-64	20	Soviet Union	
Cuba	T-62	400	Soviet Union	
Cyprus	AMX-30B2	52	France	
Cyprus	AMX-30G	30	France	
Cyprus	T-80U	82	Russia	Ordered January 2009
Czech Republic	T-72M4 CZ	30	Czech Republic	3rd tank generation Czech upgrade of T-72, produced 2003-2006.
Czech Republic	Leopard 2A4	14	West Germany	Donated by Germany in exchange for Czech tanks sent to Ukraine.

=== D ===
Country	Type	Quantity (estimated)	Origin	Notes
Denmark	Leopard 2A7DK	48	Germany	Upgraded 2A5DK to 2A7DK in 2016 (2A5DK/2A7DK is the Danish upgraded version of the 2A5/2A7) ( (optional +9 2A7DK)

=== E ===
Country	Type	Quantity (estimated)	Origin	Notes
Ecuador	Leopard 1	60	West Germany	30 1V's and 30 1A5's models bought from Chile.
Ecuador	AMX-13	80	France	Light tanks
Ecuador	T-55	3	Soviet Union	Borrowed from Peru as war compensation (Cenepa War). Some sources establish that the T-55 are part of an unfinished weapons deal .
Egypt	T-62	500	Soviet Union	300 in active service with a further 200 in storage.
Egypt	Ramses II	840	Soviet Union / Egypt	A significantly upgraded T-54/55. Though the initial prototype (T-54E) was delivered in 1984, full production did not begin until 2004–2005, an additional 140–160 are to be converted from stored T-55.
Egypt	M60	1,150	United States	Out of 735 M60A3 + 700 M60A1 were brought up to A3 Standard from U.S. Army Europe surplus stocks in Germany between 1979 and 1988 + 173 M60A3 between 1992 and 2001 + 108 M60A3 from the Austrian Army Surplus in 2002,
Egypt	M1A1 Abrams	1,130	United States	
Equatorial Guinea	T-55	3	Soviet Union	
Eritrea	T-55A/AM2	300	Soviet Union	150 in service, 150 in storage.
Eritrea	T-62	~	Soviet Union	Received a number from Ethiopia.
Ethiopia	T-55	170	Soviet Union	
Ethiopia	T-62	50	Soviet Union	
Ethiopia	T-72	~250	Soviet Union	

=== F ===
Country	Type	Quantity (estimated)	Origin	Notes
Finland	Leopard 2A4	139	West Germany	Some of the existing Leopard 2A4's are equipped with Israeli made Urdan mine rollers.
Finland	Leopard 2A6	100	Germany	In total, 100 used Leopard 2A6 tanks were delivered from the Netherlands by the end of 2019.
France	Leclerc	406	France	184 in storage, 239 is active. 200 will be upgraded to Leclerc XLR.
France	Leclerc XLR	15	France	Total 200 ordered.

=== G ===
Country	Type	Quantity (estimated)	Origin	Notes
Georgia	T-72M1 SIM-1	143	Soviet Union; Israel	
Georgia	T-55	100	Soviet Union	
Germany	Leopard 2 A5/A6/A7/A7V/A8	328	Germany	2A4 no longer in use; for resale by KMW and Rheinmetall. All 19 2A5 only used for training exercises. 18 Leopard 2A8 ordered in 2023 to backfill the 18 2A6 given to Ukraine. Leopard 1s in long-term storage, or held by FFG, KMW, and Rheinmetall for resale.
Greece	Leopard 2A6 HEL	170	Germany; Greece	License built in Greece.
Greece	Leopard 2A4	183	West Germany	
Greece	Leopard 1A4/5	501	West Germany	
Greece	M60A3	101	United States	
Greece	M48A5 MOLF	390	United States	Upgraded with a new Fire Control System similar to the one found on the Leopard 1A5
Guinea	T-55	8	Soviet Union	
Guinea-Bissau	T-55	10	Soviet Union	

=== H ===
Country	Type	Quantity (estimated)	Origin	Notes
Hungary	Leopard 2A7+	44	Germany	Ordered in 2018.
Hungary	Leopard 2A4	12	Germany	Ordered in 2018. Used units for training purposes.
Hungary	T-72M1	34	Soviet Union; Polish People's Republic	34 units in active service. Another 130 T-72 in storage.

=== I ===
Country	Type	Quantity (estimated)	Origin	Notes
India	Arjun MBT	141 (MK1 and MK1A)	India	124 Arjun MK1 MBTs and a total of 118 MK1A tanks on order. Army required nearly 3500 MBTs in future.
India	T-90	2,078	Soviet Union / Russia	464 new T-90MS are on order as of 2020. These tanks are now manufactured locally.
India	T-72	2,414	Soviet Union; Poland	Upgraded to advanced Ajeya Mk1 and MK2 standard. To be replaced with next generation MBT.
Indonesia	Leopard 2A4	42	West Germany	
Indonesia	Leopard 2 Revolution	61	Germany	Up-armored and up-rated version of Leopard 2A4
Indonesia	Kaplan MT / Harimau	18	Indonesia/Turkey	Lightweight tank
Indonesia	FV101 Scorpion	90	United Kingdom	Designed as light tank
Indonesia	AMX 13	120	France	Already retrofit, light tanks
Iran
Iran	M60 Patton	150	United States	
Iran	Chieftain MK3	100	United Kingdom	Mobarez is domestically upgraded version.
Iran	T-62	75	Soviet Union	
Iran	T-72S	565	Soviet Union / Polish People's Republic	
Iran	Zulfiqar MBT	100	United States / Iran	
Iran	Type-72Z Safir	540	Iran	
Iran	Karrar	420	Iran	Additional 380 on order.
Iraq	T-55	72	Soviet Union	
Iraq	T-72M1	125	Soviet Union	
Iraq	M1A1 Abrams	146	United States	Further 175 on order. Yet to be delivered, Tank is equipped with Export Armor Package.
Iraq	T-90S/SK	75	Russia	
Israel	Merkava Mk.1	180	Israel	
Israel	Merkava Mk.2	400	Israel	
Israel	Merkava Mk.3	780	Israel	
Israel	Merkava Mk.4	660	Israel	
Israel	Magach 6	560	United States/Israel	Upgraded M60 tank
Israel	Magach 7	1,600	United States/Israel	Upgraded M60 tank
Italy	Ariete	150	Italy	147 C1 and 3 C2 variants. To be upgraded.
Ivory Coast	T-55	10	Soviet Union	Some donated by Angola

=== J ===
Country	Type	Quantity (estimated)	Origin	Notes
Japan
Japan	Type 90	341	Japan	Built by Mitsubishi Heavy Industries until 2009. Replaced by the Type 10.
Japan	Type 10	139	Japan	Built by Mitsubishi Heavy Industries, current MBT in Japanese service.
Jordan	Leclerc	80	France	Donated by the United Arab Emirates in September 2020
Jordan	Tariq	292	United Kingdom	Locally upgraded Centurion. Most of them were modified into Temsah heavy armoured personnel carriers.
Jordan	M60A3	250	United States	Modernized by KADDB
Jordan	Khaled	274	United Kingdom	Locally upgraded Chieftain
Jordan	Challenger 1	392	United Kingdom	

=== K ===
Country	Type	Quantity (estimated)	Origin	Notes
Kazakhstan	T-55	540	Soviet Union	
Kazakhstan	T-62	75	Soviet Union	
Kazakhstan	T-72	650	Soviet Union	
Kenya	Vickers Mk 3	78	United Kingdom	
Kenya	T-72Av	76	Soviet Union	
Korea, North	T-55	1,800	Soviet Union	
Korea, North	T-62	1,000	Soviet Union	
Korea, North	Type 59	1,000	China	
Korea, North	Type 69 tank	200	China	
Korea, North	Chonma-ho	1,000	North Korea	
Korea, North	Pokpung-ho	500	North Korea	
Korea, North	M2020	9 prototypes	North Korea	
Korea, South	M48A3K	300	United States	
Korea, South	M48A5, M48A5K	500	United States	
Korea, South	T-80U, T-80UK	35	Soviet Union	Used in "aggressor" training and test purposes only. Two T-80Us were destroyed during tests in November 2024.
Korea, South	K1, K1E1	1,027	Republic of Korea	All K1s will be upgraded to K1E1 by 2026.
Korea, South	K1A2	484	Republic of Korea	
Korea, South	K2 Black Panther	206	Republic of Korea	Put into service in June 2014. Total 260 to be delivered.
Kuwait	M-84D	150	Yugoslavia	
Kuwait	M1A2	218	United States	Depleted uranium armor removed.
Kyrgyzstan	T-72	210	Soviet Union	

=== L ===
Country	Type	Quantity (estimated)	Origin	Notes
Laos	T-54/55	15	Soviet Union	
Latvia	T-55	3	Soviet Union	Exclusively for training
Lebanon	T-55	270	Soviet Union	
Lebanon	M48A5	81	United States	
Lebanon	M60A3	10	United States	
Libya
Libya	T-55	325	Soviet Union	Large numbers of tanks destroyed by NATO bombings and rebel actions during 2011 Libyan civil war
Libya	T-62	350	Soviet Union	
Libya	T-72	315	Soviet Union	

=== M ===
Country	Type	Quantity (estimated)	Origin	Notes
North Macedonia	T-72	10	Soviet Union	20 scrapped. Only 10 are in fine condition.
North Macedonia	T-55	98	Soviet Union	All were military aid from Bulgaria during the 2001 KLA insurgency. Fate unknown.
Malawi	T-55	1	Soviet Union	Medium tanks
Malaysia	PT-91M	48	Poland	Special variant, Commissioned in 2008.
Mali	T-34	30	Soviet Union	Medium tanks, Retired as of 2020
Mali	T-54		Soviet Union	
Mali	T-55	33	Soviet Union	
Mauritania	T-55	35	Soviet Union	
Mongolia	T-54	100	Soviet Union	
Mongolia	T-55	170	Soviet Union	
Mongolia	T-62	150	Soviet Union	
Mongolia	T-72	100	Soviet Union	
Morocco	M1A1	222	United States	M1A1SA "Special Armor".
Morocco	M1A2	156	United States	M1A2
Morocco	VT-1A	150	China Pakistan	VT-1A version, 54 received in 2011, 96 to be delivered.
Morocco	T-72	148	Soviet Union	T-72B/BV.
Morocco	M60A3	427	United States	260 M60A3TTS and 167 M60A3.
Morocco	M48	224	United States	224 M48A5 in active service.
Mozambique	T-55	80	Soviet Union	
Myanmar	Type 59	280	Soviet Union / China	
Myanmar	Type 69	190	Soviet Union / China	
Myanmar	T-72B	300	Soviet Union	
Myanmar	MBT-2000	200	China	

=== N ===
Country	Type	Quantity (estimated)	Origin	Notes
Namibia	T-55	1	Soviet Union	
Netherlands	Leopard 2A6	20	Germany	Most MBTs retired in 2011, 100 Leopard 2 MBTs sold to Finland in 2014. 18 Dutch Leopard 2s are still in use in the German-Dutch tank battalion Panzerbataillion 414 (leased).
Nicaragua	T-55	31	Soviet Union	
Nigeria	T-55	24	Soviet Union	
Nigeria	T-72	16	Soviet Union	
Nigeria	Vickers MBT	108	United Kingdom	
Nigeria	AMX-30	16	France	
Norway	Leopard 2A4NO	52 (36 operational)	West Germany	52 Leopard 2A4NLs were acquired from the Netherlands in 2001. 46 of these have been refurbished and brought up to Norwegian standards, while the remaining 6 are being used for spare parts. Furthermore, Norway is planning on upgrading 38 tanks to modern standards in the future. Also has Leopard 1's in storage (unknown condition and quantity). Not in service.
Norway	Leopard 2A8	54 on order, option for further 18	Germany	Norway has ordered 54 Leopard 2A8 with expected delivery starting 2026. The new MBTs are expected to achieve FOC in 2031. Existing Leopard 2A4s will not be withdrawn from service with the introduction of the Leopard 2A8s, but instead put in service with the new "Finnmarksbataljonen". 8 Leopard 2A4s, 1 Bergepanzer 2 Armoured Recovery Vehicle, and 3 NM189 Armoured Engineering Vehicles have already been donated to Ukraine.

=== O ===
Country	Type	Quantity (estimated)	Origin	Notes
Oman	M60A3	73	United States	
Oman	Challenger 2	38	United Kingdom	
Oman	Chieftain Tank	27	United Kingdom	

=== P ===
Country	Type	Quantity (estimated)	Origin	Notes
Pakistan	Type 85-IIAP	410	China	
Pakistan	T-80UD	320	Soviet Union	
Pakistan	Al-Zarrar	750	Soviet Union; China / Pakistan	Pakistani-upgraded Type 59
Pakistan	Al-Khalid Al-Khalid-l	600 150+	Pakistan	Pakistani variant of MBT-2000
Pakistan	Haidar MBT	200+	China / Pakistan	Pakistani-variant of VT-4
Pakistan	VT-4	174	China	Delivery in process MBT-3000
Peru	T-55	200	Soviet Union	50 operatives, 75 in store.
Philippines	Sabrah	18 (+10 on order)	Israel	Light/medium tank armed with 105mm gun designed by Elbit Systems based on ASCOD and Pandur II platforms.
Philippines	FV101 Scorpion	1~12	United Kingdom	Principal light tank of the Philippine Army. Returned to service in 2024. Up to 12 units planned for reactivation.
Poland	T-72M1	Unknown	Soviet Union; Polish People's Republic	In service since 1978. License built in Poland At least 290 donated to Ukraine since the beginning of 2022 Russian invasion of Ukraine.
Poland	PT-91	152	Poland	In service since 1994. Polish development of the T-72M1. 60 were donated to Ukraine since the beginning of 2022 Russian invasion of Ukraine.
Poland	Leopard 2A4	46	West Germany	In service since 2002. 14 were donated to Ukraine since the beginning of 2022 Russian Invasion of Ukraine.
Poland	Leopard 2A5	105	Germany	In service since 2014.
Poland	Leopard 2PL	82	West Germany / Germany; Poland	In service since 2020. Polish modernization of Leopard 2A4s.
Poland	M1 Abrams	201/394	United States	In service since 2023. 28 M1A2 SEPv2 tanks leased for training in 2020. 116 M1A1 FEPs to be delivered in 2023 and to be upgraded to SEPv3 standard at a later date. 250 M1A2 SEPv3s to be delivered between 2025 and 2026.
Poland	K2 Black Panther	160/1000	Republic of Korea; Poland	In service since 2022. 180 K2s to be delivered between 2022 and 2025 and to be upgraded to K2PL standard at a later date. 820 K2PLs to be produced in Poland from 2026 onwards.
Portugal	M-60 A3TTS	96	United States	
Portugal	Leopard 2A6	34	Germany	
Portugal	M48A5 Patton	86	United States	In storage. Replaced by M60A3 TTS and Leopard 2A6.

=== Q ===
Country	Type	Quantity (estimated)	Origin	Notes
Qatar	Leopard 2A7	62	Germany	Qatar signed a contract for 62 Leopard 2A7+ tanks in April 2013.

=== R ===
Country	Type	Quantity (estimated)	Origin	Notes
Romania	T-55	394	Soviet Union	
Romania	TR-580	42	Socialist Republic of Romania	
Romania	TR-85	227	Socialist Republic of Romania	
Romania	TR-85M1	54	Socialist Republic of Romania	
Romania	M1 Abrams	0 (With 54 on order)	United States	In May 2023, the decision to buy 54 used M1A2 Abrams from US Army stocks was approved by the Parliament of Romania. The Romanian M1A2 variant is designated M1A2R.
Russia	T-54/55	30 (28 lost)	Soviet Union	Some were re-activated and put into active service because of the 2022 Russian invasion of Ukraine. Mostly used as either self-propelled artillery or remote-controlled VBIED's. Remaining T-55 may be used as driver training vehicles. At least 28 lost; destroyed, damaged or captured.
Russia	T-62	600 (347 lost)	Soviet Union	Up to 600 T-62s were taken out of long-term storage. Some are being modernized into the T-62M obr.2022 variant. At least 347 lost; destroyed, damaged or captured.
Russia	T-64	500 - 2,000 In storage (104 lost)	Soviet Union	Currently not in service. Pro-Russian separatist were using T-64. At least 104 lost; destroyed, damaged or captured.
Russia	T-72	~1,100 (active) 10,000+ (In storage)	Soviet Union	800 T-72B3/B3M and 300 T-72A/B are in service. More than ten thousand T-72 of various types are in storage, most of which are in varying states of disrepair. T-72B models are being upgraded to the T-72B3M obr.2022 standard. 1,812 lost according to the Oryxblog.
Russia	T-80	~350 (active); 4,000 In Storage as of 2024	Soviet Union	~350 T-80BV/BVM/U are in active service according to the Military Balance 2024. In February 2024, the IISS estimated that a total of 4,000 MBTs including T-80B/BV/U tanks were in storage At least 1,311 lost according to the Oryxblog.
Russia	T-90	620 T-90M and an unknown amount of other T-90 variants (218 lost)	Soviet Union / Russia	Some T-90A and 620 T-90M in service as of 2026. Unknown number of T-90 and T-90A tanks in storage. All remaining T-90A are being upgraded to the T-90M standard. All T-90 have been withdrawn from storage due to the ongoing 2022 Russian invasion of Ukraine. At least 218 lost; destroyed, damaged or captured, according to the Oryxblog.

=== S ===
Country	Type	Quantity (estimated)	Origin	Notes
Saudi Arabia	AMX-30	145	France	
Saudi Arabia	M60A3	450	United States	
Saudi Arabia	M1A2	442	United States	Depleted uranium armor removed. All will receive upgraded digital systems from US-standard M1A2SEP and will be designated M1A2S.
Serbia	M-84	232	Yugoslavia / Serbia	All to be modernized to domestic M-84AS1 variant.
Serbia	T-72	91	Soviet Union	30 T-72B1MS donated by Russia, ≈50 T-72M in reserve, used mostly for crew training.
Serbia	T-55	250+	Soviet Union	Kept in reserve and are being refurbished and sold to other nations.
Sierra Leone	T-72	3	Soviet Union	Purchased from Ukraine, delivered via Poland.
Singapore	Leopard 2SG	196 (30 tanks with additional feature)	Germany	Upgraded ex-German Leopard 2A4 / Leopard 2SG-1200
Slovakia	T-72M1	22	Czechoslovakia	Leased from Czechoslovakia.
Slovakia	Leopard 2A4	6/15	West Germany	Donated from Germany
Slovenia	M-84	54	Yugoslavia	28 in active service
Slovenia	M-55S	2	Soviet Union	30 T-55 were heavily modernized in cooperation with Israel, reserve status. 28 donated to Ukraine in October 2022.
Somalia	T-54/55	40	Soviet Union	Number in operable condition unknown
Somalia	M47 Patton		United States	Number in operable condition unknown
Somalia	Centurion	40	United Kingdom	
South Africa	Olifant 1A/1B	167	United Kingdom/South Africa	
South Sudan	T-55		Soviet Union	
South Sudan	T-72	110	Soviet Union	
Spain	Leopard 2A6E	239	Germany/Spain	License built in Spain
Spain	Leopard 2A4	108	West Germany	54 reserve
Spain	M60A3 TTS	17	United States	Spanish Marines
Sudan	T-55 & mods	400	Soviet Union	
Sudan	T-72	230	Soviet Union	
Sudan	Type 96	40	China	
Sweden	Leopard Strv.122	120	Germany/Sweden	Leopard 2A5 modified to Swedish specifications. Sweden also previously leased and operated 160 Leopard 2A4s (locally designated Strv 121) from Germany, but most of these have been returned.
Switzerland	Leopard Pz 87	250	West Germany / Switzerland	Leopard 2A4; 134 upgraded to Pz87 Leopard WE with PERI-R17A2, driver rear view camera and electric Turret drive, produced in Thun/Switzerland
Syria	T-55	2,250	Soviet Union	Scores destroyed in civil war, exact numbers left unknown.
Syria	T-62	1,000	Soviet Union	Scores destroyed in civil war, exact numbers left unknown.
Syria	T-72	1,600	Soviet Union	Includes 100+ upgraded T-72B3.
Syria	T-90	40	Russia	

=== T ===
Country	Type	Quantity (estimated)	Origin	Notes
Taiwan	M60A3	480	United States	
Taiwan	CM11 Brave Tiger	450	United States / Taiwan	
Taiwan	M1A2T Abrams	108	United States	
Tajikistan	T-72	44	Soviet Union	
Tanzania	Type 59	30	Soviet Union; China	
Thailand	M48A5	105	United States	
Thailand	M60A1 and M60A3	178	United States	
Thailand	BM Oplot	49	Ukraine	5 more reported en-route as of November 2017 and manufacture of the remaining 13 completed.
Thailand	VT-4	60	China	
Togo	T-54/T-55	4	Soviet Union	
Tunisia	M60A3	84	United States	
Turkey	Altay	7	Turkey; South Korea	In serial production. 250 on order.
Turkey	Leopard 1A3T1	227	West Germany	With EMES-12A3 fire control system.
Turkey	Leopard 1T	171	West Germany; Turkey	With Volkan-M Fire control system modernization.
Turkey	Leopard 2A4	233	West Germany	15 more for spare parts.
Turkey	Leopard 2A4T1	40	West Germany; Turkey	T1 upgrade is subjected to ballistic protection improvement with ERA plates and anti-drone cages whilst integrating modern electronics.
Turkey	Leopard 2A4TM	81	West Germany; Turkey	TM upgrade is the refinement of T1 package with active protection and RCWS.
Turkey	M60A1	100	United States	All in reserve.
Turkey	M60A3 TTS	650	United States	Some additional units for spares.
Turkey	M60TM	170	United States; Israel; Turkey	The ballistic profile of the appliqué armor was improved, incorporated the MG253 120 mm gun and new electronics. It received further updates with ERA plates, active protection and a RCWS.
Turkey	M48A5T1	400	United States; Turkey	Upgraded along similar lines to the M60, with an M68 105 mm main gun, passive night vision, M60A1 fire control system and an AVDS-1790 diesel engine. All in reserve.
Turkey	M48A5T2	750	United States; Turkey	Refinement of T1 upgrade with M60A3 thermal imaging, M60A3 fire control system and a laser rangefinder.
Turkmenistan	T-72	702	Soviet Union	
Turkmenistan	T-90	10	Soviet Union / Russia	

=== U ===
Country	Type	Quantity (estimated)	Origin	Notes
Uganda	T-55	20	Soviet Union	
Uganda	T-90	44	Soviet Union / Russia	
Ukraine	M-55S	28 (6 lost)	Soviet Union; Slovenia	Slovenia donated 28 of their 30 heavily upgraded T-55 tanks to Ukraine in October 2022. At least 6 lost.
Ukraine	T-64	>1,000 (709 lost)	Soviet Union; Ukraine	Only T-64BV and T-64BM are in active service. The numbers provided are for tanks in active service, based on data from late 2021 (before the 2022 Russian invasion of Ukraine). Additionally, 578 T-64As and T-64Bs were in storage in 2021 before the war, and would need to be overhauled before returning to service. At least 709 lost; destroyed, damaged or captured.
Ukraine	T-72	578 (363 lost)	Soviet Union; Czech Republic	130 provided are for tanks in active service, based on data from late 2021 (before the 2022 Russian invasion of Ukraine). Additionally, 500 T-72/T-72As were in storage in 2021 with no plans yet for repairs. As of 26 June 2022, 188 T-72 tanks have been visually confirmed captured by the Ukrainian Ground Forces, Territorial Defense Forces and the National Guard, with the biggest number among all Russian MBT types. In April 2022, it was reported that the Czech Republic and Poland (about 200 tanks) had supplied Ukraine with more than 260 T-72 tanks in response to the 2022 Russian invasion of Ukraine. Some of these were paid for by other countries including 90 from Czech Republic were upgraded using funds from the U.S. and Denmark. At least 363 lost; destroyed, damaged or captured.
Ukraine	T-80	94 (88 lost)	Soviet Union; Ukraine	Only 34 T-80 tanks were accounted by IISS in 2021. According to an advisor to then President Petro Poroshenko in 2015, around 100 T-80BV tanks were to be restored to service. In 2020, Ukrainian media reported multiple deliveries of T-80BV tanks. 60 Russian T-80BV, T-80BVM, T-80UK, T-80UE1 and T-80U tanks have been visually confirmed captured during the 2022 Russian invasion of Ukraine as of 26 June 2022, with some put to use by the 93rd Mechanized Brigade. At least 88 lost; destroyed, damaged or captured.
Ukraine	T-84 BM Oplot	6 (1 damaged)	Ukraine	Modification of T-84. Ukraine operated 6 in 2021. At least one damaged.
Ukraine	PT-91	60 (14 lost)	Poland	Modernized version of T-72, 60 units sent by Poland. At least 14 lost; destroyed, damaged or captured.
Ukraine	T-90	16+	Soviet Union; Russia	At least 16 Russian T-90 tanks were visually confirmed to be captured by Ukrainian Forces during the Russo-Ukrainian War in 2022.
Ukraine	Leopard 1A5	135 (38 lost)	West Germany	Financed by Germany, Denmark, and the Netherlands. Delivered by Germany between 2023-2025. At least 38 lost; destroyed, damaged or captured. Rheinmetall acquired an additional 96 Leopard 1A5IT from RUAG in 2025, though their direct transfer to Ukraine is complicated by purchase contract conditions imposed by Switzerland.
Ukraine	Leopard 2	95 (41 lost)	West Germany; Germany	As of 23 February 2023, confirmed transfers to Ukraine from army stockpiles include 18 Leopard 2A6 from Germany, three 2A6 from Portugal, 14 2A4 from Poland, eight 2A4NO from Norway, eight 2A4CAN from Canada, 10 2A4 from Spain and an unknown number of battle tanks from Finland. The Netherlands agreed to help procure and supply ammunition for the tanks. Ukrainian tank operators began training on the vehicles in February 2023. The first four Leopard 2A4 tanks were delivered from Polish stocks on 24 February 2023. The remaining 10 arrived after 7 March. Norway delivered all eight tanks on 20 March 2022. Canada delivered all eight Leopard 2A4CAN by 18 April 2023. Spain delivered its first six in late April, and the remaining four by June. Rheinmetall initially claimed it could prepare up to 51 Leopard 2A4 tanks for Ukraine. However, 14 of these were instead donated to Czechia and 15 were donated to Slovakia as part of Germany's Ringtaush program. 14 were jointly purchased by the Netherlands and Denmark for Ukraine on 20 April 2024, with delivery scheduled for Q1 2024. On 19 March 2024, Spain announced it is preparing an additional 19 or 20 Leopard 2A4 tanks for Ukraine, to be delivered over two batches in June and September respectively. At least 41 Leopard 2 lost.
Ukraine	Stridsvagn 122	10 (9 lost)	Germany; Sweden	Domestically manufactured Stridsvagn 122 variant (2A5 equivalent) as they are the only Leopards operated by Sweden. Delivered by July 2023. At least 9 lost; destroyed, damaged or captured.
Ukraine	Challenger 2	14 (2 lost)	United Kingdom	Delivered in 2023. At least 2 lost.
Ukraine	M1 Abrams	80 (27 lost)	United States	31 sent by the USA in 2023. An additional 49 delivered by Australia in 2025. At least 27 lost.
United Arab Emirates	OF-40 Mk.2	36	Italy	Being withdrawn from service.
United Arab Emirates	AMX-30S	45	France	
United Arab Emirates	Leclerc	388	France	
United Kingdom	Challenger 2	158 active (59 Driver training and reserve) (70 in storage, since 2010)	United Kingdom	Equips three regular and one Yeomanry (reserve) Armoured Regiments of the Royal Armoured Corps, each of 56 tanks. A Challenger 2 Life Extension Project (LEP) is planned, and will include new optronics, situational awareness and fire control systems, with 148 tanks upgraded and rebadges as Challenger 3. In 2010 due to budget cuts, 118 tanks were withdrawn from service. Of these, 70 were put in storage and 48 were converted to Driver Training Tanks.
United States	M1A1/M1A2	2,509	United States	750 M1A1 SA, 1,605 M1A2 SEPv2, 154 M1A2 SEPv3. (some 3,700 M1A1, M1A2 SEPv2/v3 in storage) All USMC M1A1s retired in 2021 and to be divested by 2025.
Uruguay	Ti-67	15	Soviet Union/Israel	T-55 significantly upgraded by Israel
Uzbekistan	T-55	80	Soviet Union	
Uzbekistan	T-62	170	Soviet Union	
Uzbekistan	T-64	100	Soviet Union	
Uzbekistan	T-72	70	Soviet Union	

=== V ===
Country	Type	Quantity (estimated)	Origin	Notes
Venezuela	AMX-30V	81	France	
Venezuela	T72M1M	92	Soviet Union/Russia	Purchased in Sept, 2009; the deliveries started in January, 2011
Vietnam	Type 59	350	China	
Vietnam	T-55	900	Soviet Union	
Vietnam	T-62	200	Soviet Union	
Vietnam	T-90S/SK	64	Russia	

=== Y ===
Country	Type	Quantity (estimated)	Origin	Notes
Yemen	M60A1	50	United States	
Yemen	T-55	450	Soviet Union	
Yemen	T-62	200	Soviet Union	
Yemen	T-72	60	Soviet Union	

=== Z ===
Country	Type	Quantity (estimated)	Origin	Notes
Zambia	T-55	10	Soviet Union	Purchased 1976 and 1981
Zambia	Type 59	20	China	
Zimbabwe	Type 59	35	Soviet Union; China	
Zimbabwe	Type 69	10	Soviet Union; China	
Zimbabwe	T-54/55	32	Soviet Union	

== See also ==
- Armoured fighting vehicle classification
- List of main battle tanks by generation

== Sources ==
- Hunnicutt, R. P. Patton: A History of the American Main Battle Tank. 1984. Presidio Press; ISBN 0-89141-230-1.
- International Institute for Strategic Studies (IISS) (14 February 2017). The Military Balance 2017. Routledge. ISBN 978-1-85743-900-7.
- War History. (2024, December 14). Chinese Type 59 Tank. WarHistory.org. https://warhistory.org/zh/@msw/article/chinese-type-59-tank
- International Institute for Strategic Studies (15 February 2023). The Military Balance 2023. Taylor & Francis. ISBN 978-1-000-91070-4.
