= Hamid Javaid =

Pakistani general (born 1947)

- Born: 16 August 1946; Rawalpindi, Punjab, Pakistan
- Died: 11 May 2019 (aged 72); Rawalpindi, Punjab, Pakistan
- Military career
- Allegiance: Pakistan
- Branch: Pakistan Army
- Service years: 1965 – 2004
- Rank: Lieutenant General
- Unit: Armoured Corps (15th Lancers)
- Commands: Commander XXXI Corps; DG Heavy Industries Taxila; Chief of Staff to the President of Pakistan
- Conflicts: Indo-Pakistani War of 1965; Indo-Pakistani War of 1971
- Awards: Hilal-i-Imtiaz; Hilal-i-Imtiaz (Military)
- Other work: President Al-Shifa Trust (2011-2019); Chairman PARCO (Feb 2008 - Aug 2008)

HAMIDJAVED/9203459267397 Hamid Javaid (Urdu: حامد جاوید), HI, HI(M), AFWC, PSC, (October 1947 – 2019) was a Pakistan Army general who served as Chief of Staff (COS) to President Pervez Musharraf for six years from September 2001 to December 2007. Javaid was the son of Mohammad Ashraf, a leader of Allama Mashriqi's Khaksar Tehrik.

He played a major role in ensuring that governance was transparent at the highest level and also worked to ensure harmonious relations between the civil and the military bureaucracies. He started the Al-Zarrar and Al-Khalid main battle tank projects while working as the director-general of Heavy Industries Taxila.

In February 2011 he became President of Al-Shifa Trust Eye Hospital in Rawalpindi.

== Military career ==
Javaid attended Cadet College Hasan Abdal and was commissioned in the Armoured Corps of the Pakistan Army on 31 October 1965. He received basic training from the School of Armour and Mechanized Warfare in Nowshera, Khyber Pakhtunkhwa followed by training in the US Army Armor School in Fort Knox, Kentucky. He was a graduate of the Command and Staff College, Quetta and National Defence College, Rawalpindi.

Javaid served as the military attaché to the United States from 1986 to 1990. He later commanded the XXXI Corps Reserve at Bahawalpur for two years after which he headed Heavy Industries Taxila.

During his four years stint as Chairman Heavy Industries Taxila (HIT) he successfully completed the R&D on Al-Khalid and delivered to the Pakistan Army the first batch of its indigenously manufactured world class Main Battle Tank. Lt Gen (R) Hamid Javaid also successfully conceived and produced Tank Al-Zarrar and several other armored and security vehicles.

== Chief of Staff ==
In 2001, he became Chief of Staff (COS). He advised Musharraf on reconciliation with leading political parties so that a smooth transition could be ensured at the time of 2008 elections. He played an important role in negotiating the Seventeenth Amendment to the Constitution of Pakistan and a working arrangement with Benazir Bhutto. He maintained a low profile, refusing to take an official residence or even a security guard and traveled in a private car.

Javaid is thought to have been against the emergency imposed in the country on 3 November 2007, which is considered the main reason for his resignation. He served as Chief of Staff to President Musharraf until 1 November 2007.

=== Presidential view ===
President Musharraf in his speech at Javaid's retirement, said that "whether it was the situation after the 9/11 attacks, the confrontation and rapprochement with regard to confidence building measures (CBMs) with India, the law and order problem, the domestic political situation, the passage of the 17th Amendment, or the encouragement of foreign direct investment (FDI), Lt-Gen Hamid Javaid made a vital contribution in tackling these issues very intelligently and prudently for the benefit of the country and nation.... Had he not been there, the project of Al-Khalid tank could not be achieved."

The President hailed him as an honest, upright, dedicated, hard-working and a balanced officer and man, with clarity of approach and thinking.

== Al-Shifa Trust ==
After retirement as chief of staff, Hamid Javaid was made the chairman of the Pakistan Arab Refinery (PARCO) in February 2008. He resigned from that post in August 2008. He later became the second President Al-Shifa Trust Eye Hospital in 2011 and served there until his death in 2019. The trust runs four eye hospitals in Rawalpindi, Sukkur, Kohat and Muzaffarabad.

== Death ==
Hamid Javaid died on 11 May 2019 due to cardiac complications after a knee replacement surgery.
