= VT-4 =

Chinese Main battle tank

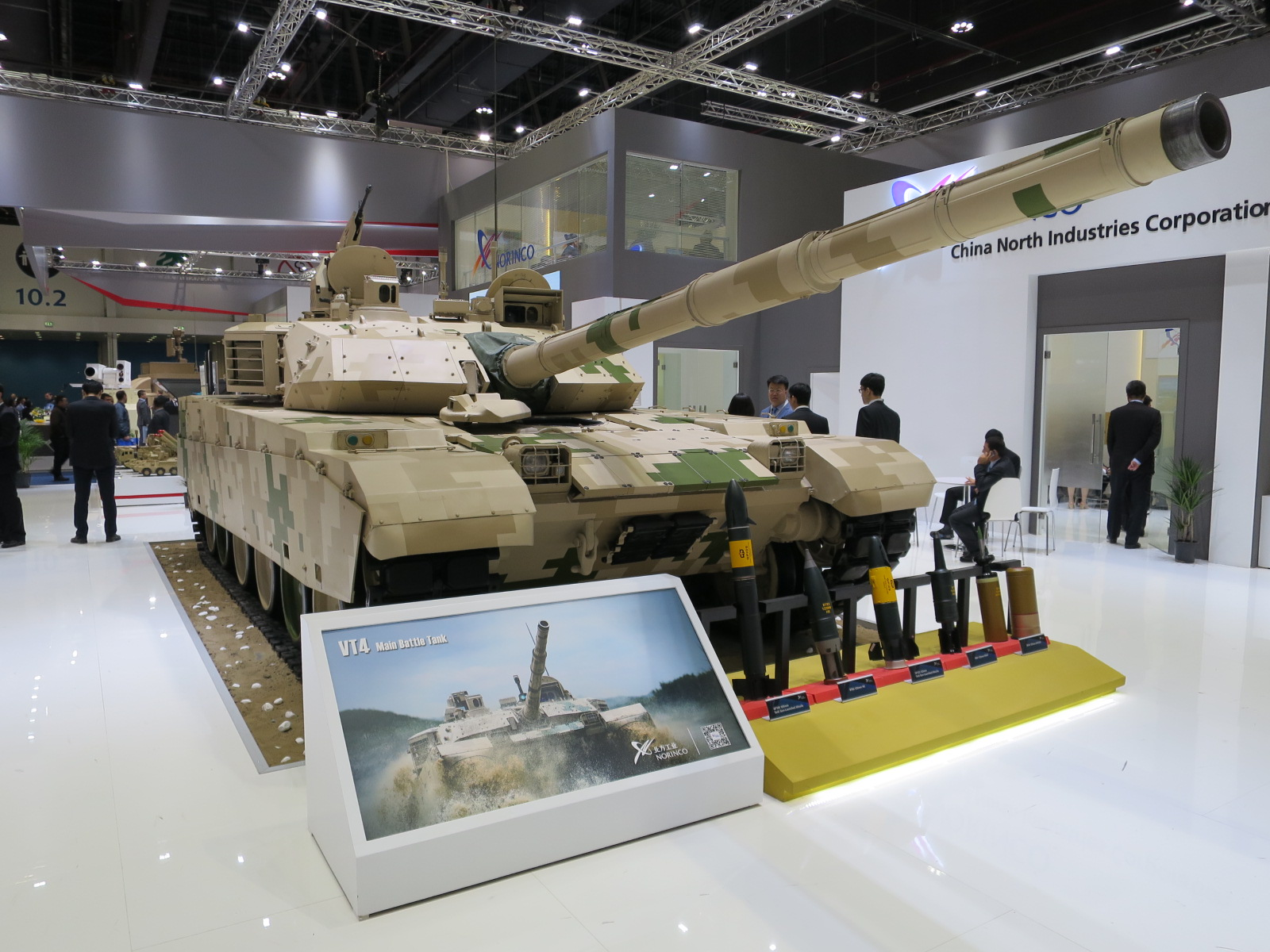
- Type: Main battle tank
- Place of origin: China

Service history
- In service: 2017–present
- Used by: See § Operators
- Wars: War against the Islamic State; Boko Haram insurgency; 2025 Cambodia‒Thailand conflict

Production history
- Designer: Norinco
- Manufacturer: Norinco; Heavy Industries Taxila
- Unit cost: $4.9 million
- Produced: 2017–present
- Variants: See Variants

Specifications
- Mass: 52 tonnes (57 short tons)
- Length: 10.10 m (33.1 ft)
- Width: 3.44 m (11.3 ft)
- Height: 2.40 m (7 ft 10 in)
- Crew: 3 (commander, driver, gunner)
- Armour: composite armour and Explosive reactive armour (ERA)
- Main armament: ZPT-98A 125 mm (4.9 in) smoothbore gun, 38 rounds (22 in the autoloader)
- Secondary armament: 1 × RWS 12.7 mm (0.50 in) AA HMG; 1 × 7.62 mm (0.300 in) coaxial MG
- Engine: VT/E1 V12 diesel engine 1,200 hp (895 kW) at 2,300 rpm
- Power/weight: 23 hp/tonne
- Transmission: Ch1000B automatic (6 FWD/2 REV)
- Suspension: torsion bars
- Ground clearance: 43 cm (1 ft 4.93 in)
- Operational range: 500 km (310 mi)
- Maximum speed: 70 km/h (43 mph)

The VT-4 (Chinese: VT-4主战坦克; pinyin: VT-4 zhǔzhàn tǎnkè), also known as the MBT-3000, is a Chinese modernized main battle tank built by Norinco for overseas export.

== Development ==
During the development of the Type 90-II/Al-Khalid (also known as MBT-2000) in the 1980s, the gearbox and engine were originally imported from Germany, but this plan was abandoned due to a Western arms embargo. The powertrain instead was sourced from Ukraine, the same for most Chinese export vehicles at the time.

China eventually developed domestic powertrains, which led to the creation of the MBT-3000 program for export customers. MBT-3000 was the successor of the Type-90II (MBT-2000) export tank. The MBT-3000 project later named as VT-4 began development in 2009 as a co-operation with the First Inner Mongolia Machinery Factory and other companies.

The MBT-3000 concept debuted at the 2012 Eurosatory. The tank was subsequently shown at the 2014 Norinco Armour Day and the 10th China International Aviation & Aerospace Exhibition as the VT-4.

== Design ==
The VT-4 shares many subsystems technology and features from other latest Chinese main battle tanks such as Type 96B and Type 99A. Key examples are an automatic transmission system, 125 mm smoothbore cannon, muzzle reference system, FY-4 ERA, carousel-style autoloader, and overall geometry.

=== Armament ===
The VT-4 has a ZPT-98A 125 mm smoothbore gun capable of firing APFSDS, HEAT and HE rounds and gun-launched anti-tank guided missiles. There is also a remote controlled weapon station on the turret armed with a 12.7 mm heavy machine gun. The fire-control system has a panoramic sight with hunter-killer capabilities. The gunner sight features a laser rangefinder and a Thales Catherine-FC thermal imager.

=== Protection ===
The tank is protected by dual-layer protection consisting of composite armour and FY-4 explosive reactive armour. According to the chief designer Feng Yibai, the frontal protection force is equivalent to 500 mm homogeneous steel armour, and the explosive reactive armour is around 700 mm. The front turret has wedge-shaped armour similar to other contemporary Chinese MBT's and the hull sides have conventional metal sideskirts. The VT-4A1 variant is equipped with a "hardkill" active protection system designated GL5, defensive grenade launchers and a laser warning device. The vehicle also has an IFF system, NBC protection, explosion-suppression system, fire-extinguishing system and air conditioning.

=== Mobility ===
According to Norinco, the VT-4 uses a locally produced 1,200 hp (895 kW) VT/E1 diesel engine with torsion bar suspension and an Ch1000B automatic transmission. Steering and acceleration is handled by a steering wheel and automatic gear transmission. VT-4 is also capable of neutral steering.

=== Command and control ===
The tank is also integrated with digital communications systems for tank to tank communication and communication between commanders.

== Service history ==
=== Nigeria ===
In 2020, Nigeria received the first batch of VT-4 from Norinco. The tank had the first combat debut during Operation Tura Takai Bango. As of 2025, one VT-4 had been confirmed destroyed during combat with Boko Haram.

=== Thailand ===
In February 2016, the RTA allocated $255 million for fiscal years from 2016 to 2018 to purchase new MBT to replace the M41 Walker Bulldog in service since the Vietnam War era. Previously, Thailand purchased 49 T-84s from Ukraine in 2011 with scheduled delivery by 2015; however, Ukraine faced issues in manufacturing, and delivery only began in 2014. Therefore, Thailand decided to look for different manufacturer, and short listed three MBTS: the Russian T-90S, the South Korean K1A1, and the Chinese VT-4.

In May 2016, Thailand signed a $150 million agreement with Norinco to purchase 28 VT-4s.

On 4 April 2017, the Thai cabinet approved the purchase of 10 VT-4s worth $58 million as a second batch.

The VT-4 was first displayed by the Thai military in January 2018 after the first units were delivered in October the preceding year. Following the VT-4's demonstration, the commander at the Royal Thai Army Cavalry Centre expressed his satisfaction with the VT-4 to the press, calling it a world-class advanced tank with excellent informatization, manoeuvrability, and firepower. On 16 January 2019, Thai media reported that the RTA plans to purchase 14 VT-4s at $72.5 million.

On 8 November 2023, Norinco disclosed that it has completed deliveries of 60 VT-4s to Thailand.

In 2025, VT-4s were used extensively in the border conflict with Cambodia. In December, a VT-4 main battle tank operated by the Royal Thai Army (RTA) suffered an accident during combat operations against Cambodian forces, with its 125mm main gun barrel rupturing and damaging external systems. Colonel Ritcha Suchasuwan commented that the VT-4 tank had been continuously engaged in heavy firing throughout the operation period, and that there were several possible explanations for the incident. Despite the criticism, Thailand continued to purchase Norinco armored vehicles in 2026.

== Variants ==
MBT-3000
Prototype.
VT-4
Production model.
VT-4A1
Improved model with a modified turret. The new turret features radar panels, repositioned grenade dischargers, a new hard-kill active protection system, and a launcher for small attack drones.
Haider
Indigenously manufactured Pakistani variant.
VN20
Heavy infantry fighting vehicle.

== Operators ==
- Nigeria − ~17 in service as of 2025.
- Pakistan − 176 tanks initially ordered in 2018–2019. Officially inducted into service in 2021. Indigenous Haider variant unveiled in 2024.
- Thailand − 60 in service as of 2025.

== Bibliography ==
- International Institute for Strategic Studies (2024). The Military Balance 2024. Taylor & Francis. ISBN 978-1-040-05115-3.
