= Haider (tank) =

Pakistani main battle tank

- Type: Main battle tank
- Place of origin: Pakistan; China

Service history
- In service: 2024–present
- Used by: Pakistan Army

Production history
- Designer: Norinco / Heavy Industries Taxila
- Manufacturer: Heavy Industries Taxila
- Developed from: VT-4

Specifications
- Length: 10.10 m (33.1 ft)
- Width: 3.40 m (11.2 ft)
- Height: 2.30 m (7.5 ft)
- Crew: 3
- Armor: Composite with ERA
- Main armament: 125 mm smoothbore gun
- Secondary armament: 12.7 mm machine gun; 7.62 mm coaxial machine gun
- Engine: Four-stroke turbo charged electronically-controlled Diesel engine 1200 hp
- Transmission: Hydro-mechanical Automatic Manual Transmission
- Suspension: Torsion Type
- Operational range: 500 km (310 mi)
- Maximum speed: 70 km/h (43 mph)

The Haider (Urdu: حیدر, lit. 'Lion') is a third-generation-plus Pakistani main battle tank (MBT) built by Heavy Industries Taxila (HIT) for the Pakistan Army in collaboration with China's Norinco. It is an indigenously manufactured variant of the Chinese VT-4 MBT. The tank was first shown in the UAE's IDEX defense exhibition in 2023, which was displayed on the pavilion of Pakistan, and it was officially unveiled in a rollout ceremony at HIT in 2024.

== Design ==
The design of Haider MBT is conventional with the driver seated at the front center of the hull, the turret in the middle and the engine in rear. The tank has a crew of three: driver, commander and gunner.

=== Armament ===
The main armament is a 125 mm smoothbore gun. There are also a 7.62 mm coaxial machine gun and a 12.7 mm heavy machine gun in a remotely operated weapon system (ROWS) on the turret roof.

=== Armor ===
The base armor is welded steel and composites, with explosive reactive armor (ERA) on the hull and turret.

=== Suspension ===
The Haider tank's torsion suspension system has six road wheels on each side with the first and former wheels mounted on hydraulic shock absorbers.

=== Fire control system ===
The Haider MBT is equipped with an advanced fire control system that contains a variety of sensors and targeting device to enhance the tank's accuracy and lethality. This system is designed to help the tank's crew have a clear view of the battlefield and to identify and engage threats effectively.

The main gun of the tank is equipped with thermal imaging sight (To detect heat signatures and to visualize heat patterns even in low-light environments), laser rangefinder (assists the gunner in determining the precise distance to a target) and a panoramic commander's sight (360 view of the battle field).

The fire control system also includes a ballistic computer which calculates the firing solution for the main gun based on the target's distance, angle and various other parameters. This assists the crew to ensure that the tank's rounds hit their target accurately and with maximum effect.

With addition to these features, the lethality of the tank is further increased by the addition of a sophisticated ballistic computer that with pinpoint accuracy, calculates the firing solution for the main gun. This feature promises accuracy with precision.

== Unveiling ceremony ==
The Haider main battle tank was unveiled on 6 March 2024 at Heavy Industries Taxila. Senior officials including Chief of Army Staff (COAS) and Chief of Defence Forces (CDF) Field Marshal Asim Munir participated in the ceremony.

== See also ==
- VT-4
- Al-Khalid tank
