= Al Qaswa =

Al-Qaswa
- Type: Armored logistics vehicle
- Place of origin: Pakistan

Service history
- Used by: Pakistan Army

Production history
- Designer: Heavy Industries Taxila
- Designed: 2002
- Manufacturer: APC Factory
- Developed from: M113P

Specifications
- Mass: 8,500 kg (18,700 lb) (Curb weight); 14,500 kg (32,000 lb) (Combat weight)
- Length: 5.6 m (220 in)
- Width: 2.54 m (100 in)
- Height: 2.6 m (100 in)
- Crew: 2 (Driver & Commander)
- Armor: 5083 aluminium alloy
- Secondary armament: 1x12.7mm M2 Browning or DShK Heavy Machine Gun
- Engine: Detroit Diesel 6V53T; 265 HP @ 2800 r.p.m.
- Drive: Tracked
- Transmission: 3-speed auto
- Suspension: Torsion bar
- Maximum speed: 35 km/h (22 mph) (level land)
- Steering system: Deferential or pivot brake

The Al-Qaswa (Arabic: ٱلْقَصْوَاء) is a tracked logistics vehicle developed by Pakistan's Heavy Industries Taxila (HIT). It is based on the M113 APC and can carry 6 tones of military supplies.

== Etymology ==
The vehicle is named after the Prophet Muhammad's beloved Arabian camel.

== Overview ==
The first prototype of the Al Qaswa was completed in 2002. Designed for logistics roles, the vehicle can carry 6 tones of military supplies in its cargo compartment across all types of cross-country terrain especially in Pakistan's multi-terrain region.

The vehicle is based on the chassis of the popular American M113 APC but instead of the normal five road wheels, the Al-qaswa has six on each side which gives the vehicle greater weight distribution and payload capacity. Furthermore, the cargo compartment can be adapted for different combat scenarios such as a weapons station for mortars, missile launchers, radars, Tactical Command Vehicle (TCV), MEDEVAC, maintenance vehicle etc.

== Operators ==
- Pakistan
  - Pakistan Army

== See also ==
- M548
