= Heavy Industries Taxila =

Pakistani State owned enterprise

- Native name: ہیوی انڈسٹریز ٹیکسلا
- Formerly: Heavy Rebuild Factory (HRF)
- Type: State owned enterprise
- Industry: Defense industry
- Founded: 1971; 55 years ago
- Founder: Ministry of Defence
- Headquarters: Taxila, Pakistan
- Area served: Worldwide
- Key people: Chairman: Maj-Gen. Ali Iqbal
- Products: Armoured fighting vehicles, Civilian armoured cars, Military armoured cars, Self-propelled artillery, Cannons
- Number of employees: ~5200
- Parent: Ministry of Defence Production
- Subsidiaries: Margalla Heavy Industries Ltd.
- Website: www.hit.gov.pk

Heavy Industries Taxila (Reporting name: HIT, Urdu: ہیوی انڈسٹریز ٹیکسلا) is a Pakistani state-owned enterprise and defense contractor working under the Ministry of Defence Production, located in Taxila, Punjab. Inaugurated in 1979 by then President Zia-ul-Haq as the "Heavy Rebuild Factory," the facility specialises in repairing, rebuilding, developing, and manufacturing various tanks and other armoured vehicles.

HIT has extensive experience in the overhaul and upgrade of tracked armoured fighting vehicles for the Pakistan Armed Forces.

HIT's commercial wing specialises in irrigation equipment systems and lab services such as material testing and casting.

== History ==
Plans to establish a heavy vehicles facility were envisaged as early as July 1968, when President Ayub Khan negotiated a credit offered by Czechoslovakia for establishing a workshop at Multan for the overhaul of T-59 MBTs which the Pakistan Army's Armoured Corps was acquiring in large numbers from China but the project received opposition from the former Soviet Union who refuse to grant clearance to the Czech side for the construction of the facility.

In 1970, the Defence Secretary, Syed Ghiasuddin Ahmed, on instructions of the President Yahya Khan, channelled a formal request to the Chinese government through the Chinese ambassador to establish a "tank manufacturing plant" for Pakistan, in response to which the Chinese dispatched a team from the People's Liberation Army (PLA) for discussions.

As a first step, experts from China and Pakistan surveyed sites around Multan and Rawalpindi in May 1971, with the latter's Taxila area eventually being selected as the ideal location for the facility. Therefore, a MoU was signed in July 1971 between the government of Pakistan and the government of China for a "tank re-build complex".

In the aftermath of the war with India in 1971, the Ministry of Defence realised the importance and critical need of indigenisation and developing a local defence industry. As a result, Project-711 was initiated, which was overseen from Chaklala under the jurisdiction of the Defence Production Division of the Ministry of Defence (today's Ministry of Defence Production). Under Project-711, construction of a Heavy Rebuild Factory for T-59s commenced at the previously selected site at Taxila with assistance from China's Norinco. It started with the construction of residential buildings for the factory's employees in early 1973, followed by the construction of the rebuild complex in 1975. Construction of the complex was completed by the late 1970s. The Heavy Rebuild Factory (T-series) was formally inaugurated in 1979 by President Zia-ul-Haq, with the first locally overhauled T-59 rolled out of the factory's production line. A year later, in 1980, the factory initiated serial production with a yearly capacity to rebuild 100 T-59s and 250 engines.

By 1992, new factories had been constructed as HRF transformed into a large multi-factory military industrial complex spanning over 1400 acres, supplemented by 2 more R&D labs in 2007. Altogether, the complex had a combined workforce of 5200 engineers and technicians. Subsequently, the facility was renamed to "Heavy Industries Taxila".

By the 2020s, HIT had manufactured 1800 armoured fighting vehicles and 400+ internal security vehicles besides overhauling 5000 armoured vehicles.

== Production ==
=== Main battle tanks (MBT) ===
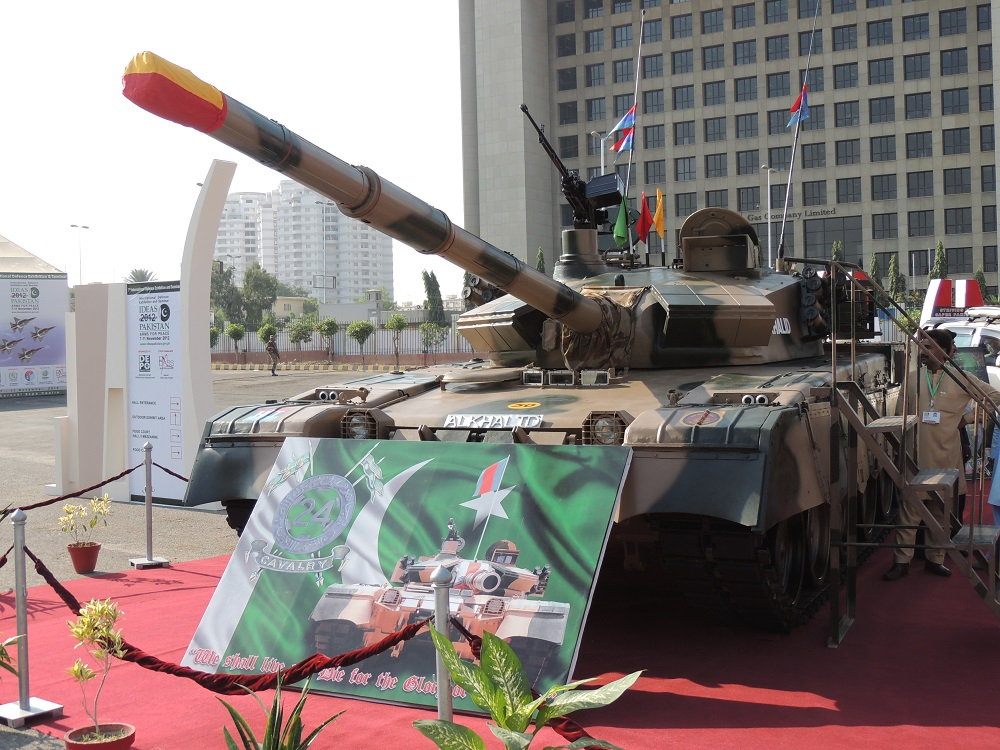
The Al-Khalid MBT at the IDEAS 2022 defence exhibition.

- Haider – 3rd+ generation main battle tank. Pakistani modernised variant of VT-4, jointly developed with Norinco of China.
- Al-Khalid – 3rd generation main battle tank. Jointly developed with Norinco of China, entered service in 2001.
  - Al-Khalid I – Upgraded variant of Al-Khalid, entered service in 2020.
  - Al-Khalid II – Modernised Al-Khalid successor, status unclear, probably replaced by Haider.
- Al-Zarrar – 2nd generation main battle tank. Heavily upgraded Type 59 tank, entered service in 2004.

=== Infantry fighting vehicles (IFV) ===
- Viper – The prototype was showcased in IDEAS 2018. The IFV is based on APC Saad chassis with 6 road wheels, weighs 16 tons, and has appliqué armour. Viper can accommodate 13 fully equipped troops; and has a modified Turra 30 remotely controlled weapon station (RCWS) armed with a Slovak-made Shipunov 2A42 30 mm automatic cannon, Kalashnikov PKT 7.62 mm medium machine gun (MG), two ready-to-use 9M113 Konkurs (AT-6 'Spandrel') anti-tank guided missiles and smoke dischargers.
- Al-Hamza – The IFV is based on APC Saad, fitted with 25 mm automatic cannon. It was developed as an export product and is not in service with the Pakistan Army.

=== Armoured personnel carriers (APC) ===
- APC Talha – Armoured personnel carrier based on M113 chassis with five road wheels, accommodates 11 fully equipped troops. 250 delivered to the Pakistan Army by 2006.
- APC Saad – Armoured personnel carrier based on the APC Talha design. Modified with extended hull and six road wheels, 14.5 mm machine gun, improved armour protection and a more powerful engine supplied by Germany's MTU. Accommodates 13 fully equipped troops.
- Dragoon II – Armoured multi-role vehicle built with a supervision and support of DUMA Engineering of Belgium.
- Mohafiz series – Internal security vehicle
  - Mohafiz-II – Based on the Land Rover Defender.
  - Mohafiz-III (Protector) – Based on the Land Cruiser 79.
  - Mohafiz-IV (Interceptor) – Upgraded variant of Mohafiz (vehicle) series based on the Land Cruiser 79.

=== Fire support vehicles ===
- Maaz – Based on the APC Talha, armed with the Baktar-Shikan anti-tank guided missile (ATGM) launcher and operated by a crew of four. There is capacity for eight extra rounds and the missile firing unit on the roof is retracted into the cabin for reloading.
- Mouz – Based on the APC Talha, armed with either the Anza or RBS 70 air-defence missile systems. The missile firing unit on the roof is retracted into the cabin for reloading.
- Sakb – Armoured Command-and-Control vehicle based on the APC Talha.

=== Engineering & support vehicles ===
- Al-Hadeed – Armoured recovery vehicle based on APC Saad.
- Al-Khalid AVLB – Armoured vehicle-launched bridge based on Al-Khalid tank.

=== Armoured utility vehicles ===
- Al-Qaswa – Armoured logistics vehicle based on APC Talha.

=== Weapons ===
- 125mm Smooth bore tank gun – for Al-Khalid & Al-Zarrar tanks.
- 155mm Self propelled (SP) gun – for M109A2 (overhauled) self-propelled howitzer.

=== Former products ===
- Type 85-IIAP – Chinese main battle tank produced under license.
- Type 69-IIMP – Chinese main battle tank produced under license.
- M113 – Armoured personnel carrier produced under license. (APC rebuild & overhaul facility is still running).

== See also ==
- Defence Science & Technology Organisation
- Pakistan Armed Forces
- Pakistan Ordnance Factories
