= List of main battle tanks by generation =

Chronological listing of main battle tanks

Like jet fighter generations, main battle tanks are often classified as belonging to a particular generation, although the actual definition and membership in these generations are not defined. Typically, generations are defined either by the time of their introduction or technological advancements, such as new armour technologies, the introduction of new electronic sub-systems and more powerful guns.

== Definition of main battle tank generations ==
The fundamental issue with classifying main battle tanks into generations is the lack of a common, internationally accepted definition. Different attempts to define main battle tanks have been made by authors, historians and militaries in the past, many of which co-exist to this day.

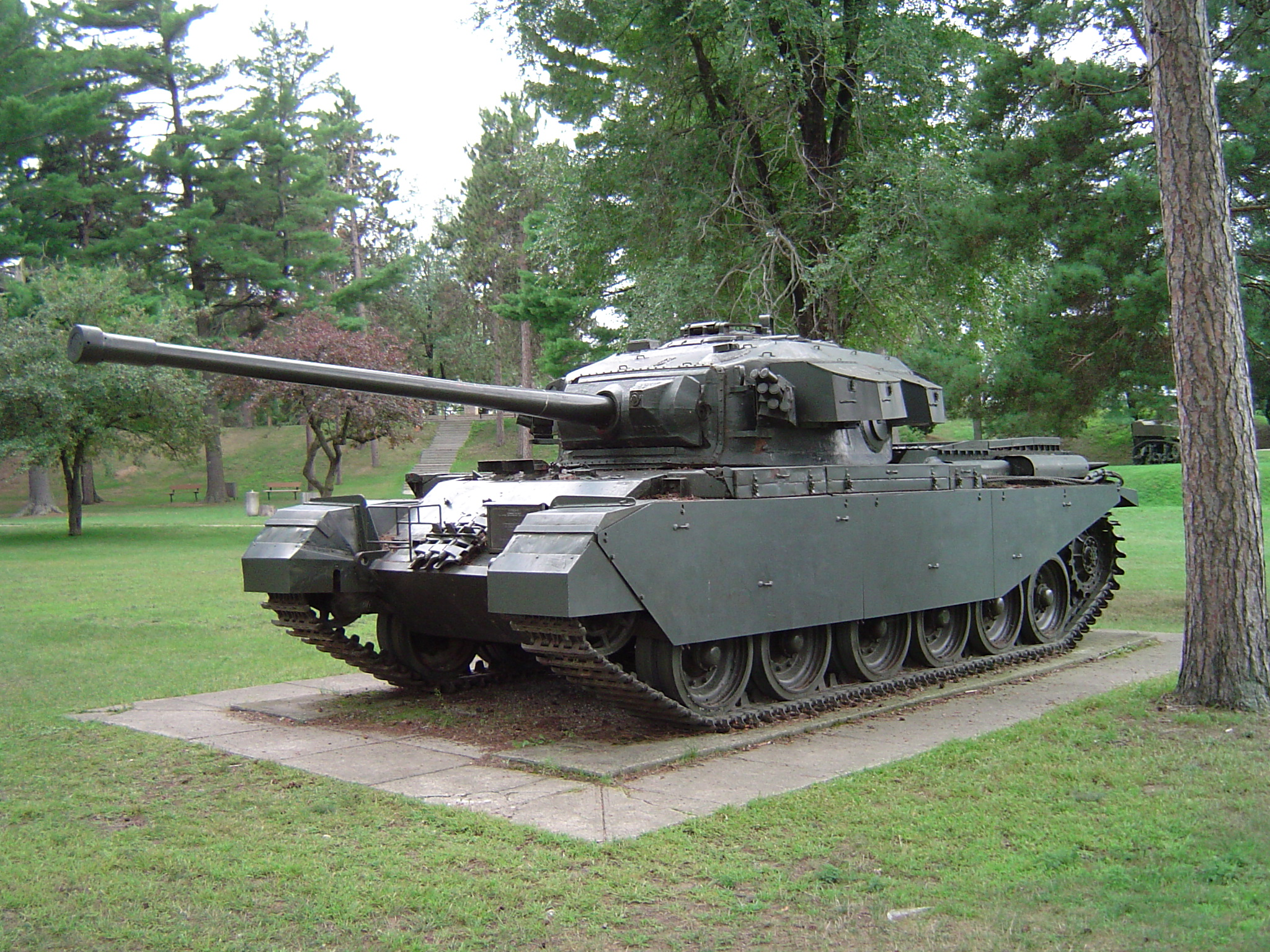
The British Centurion is sometimes considered a first generation main battle tank

The Canadian Army Command & Staff College developed a system to classify Western main battle tanks in three different generations (Soviet/Russian ones are not covered). Tanks such as the Chieftain, Leopard 1, M48 and M60 are considered first generation MBTs, while the Challenger 1, Leopard 2 and M1 Abrams are considered second generation ones. Digital tanks such as the Leclerc, Leopard 2A5 and M1A2 Abrams are considered third generation tanks.

The military of the People's Republic of China recognizes four generations of its own tanks.

In his 1983 book, Rolf Hilmes describes three generations of post-war main battle tanks. In his system for the classification of main battle tanks, the first generation of MBTs was roughly being fielded between 1950 and 1960, the second generation roughly between 1960 and 1970, and the third generation starting in 1980 with a predicted end by 1990.

In Hilmes' system, older tanks cannot reach higher generations via upgrades even when these upgrades include all characteristics defining the newer generations. Instead, heavily upgraded tanks belong to so-called intermediate generations (Zwischengenerationen) with the first, ranging from 1970 to 1980, containing upgraded second generation MBTs (e.g. M60A2, Leopard 1A4) as well as new MBTs produced during that time frame (e.g. the T-64, Merkava and TAM) which lack some of the features defining the third generation. The first generation of main battle tanks was based on or influenced by designs of World War II, most notably the Soviet T-34. The second generation was equipped with NBC protection systems, night-vision devices, a stabilized main gun and at least a mechanical fire-control system. The third generation is in Western parlance determined by the usage of thermal imagers, improved fire-control systems and special armour. However, Hilmes acknowledged that tanks cannot be definitively grouped by generations, as each tank-producing country develops and introduces its tanks in tune with its own ideas and needs. He also states that breakdown of postwar tanks by generations is based on timeframe and technical factors, as a basis for further discussion.

By 2007, Hilmes saw a fourth generation of post-war main battle tanks (containing certain tanks fielded in 1990 to 2000) and predicted a fifth (expected to appear by 2010). Defining characteristics of the fourth generation are autoloaders, adapted modular armour, battlefield managements systems and improved digital electronics, more powerful guns, night sights (passive or thermal imagers) for the commander's independent periscope and often hydropneumatic suspensions. Additionally, a third intermediate generation (1990 to 2000) was established in his system, containing tanks like the Leopard 2A5, the PT-91 Twardy and the T-90.

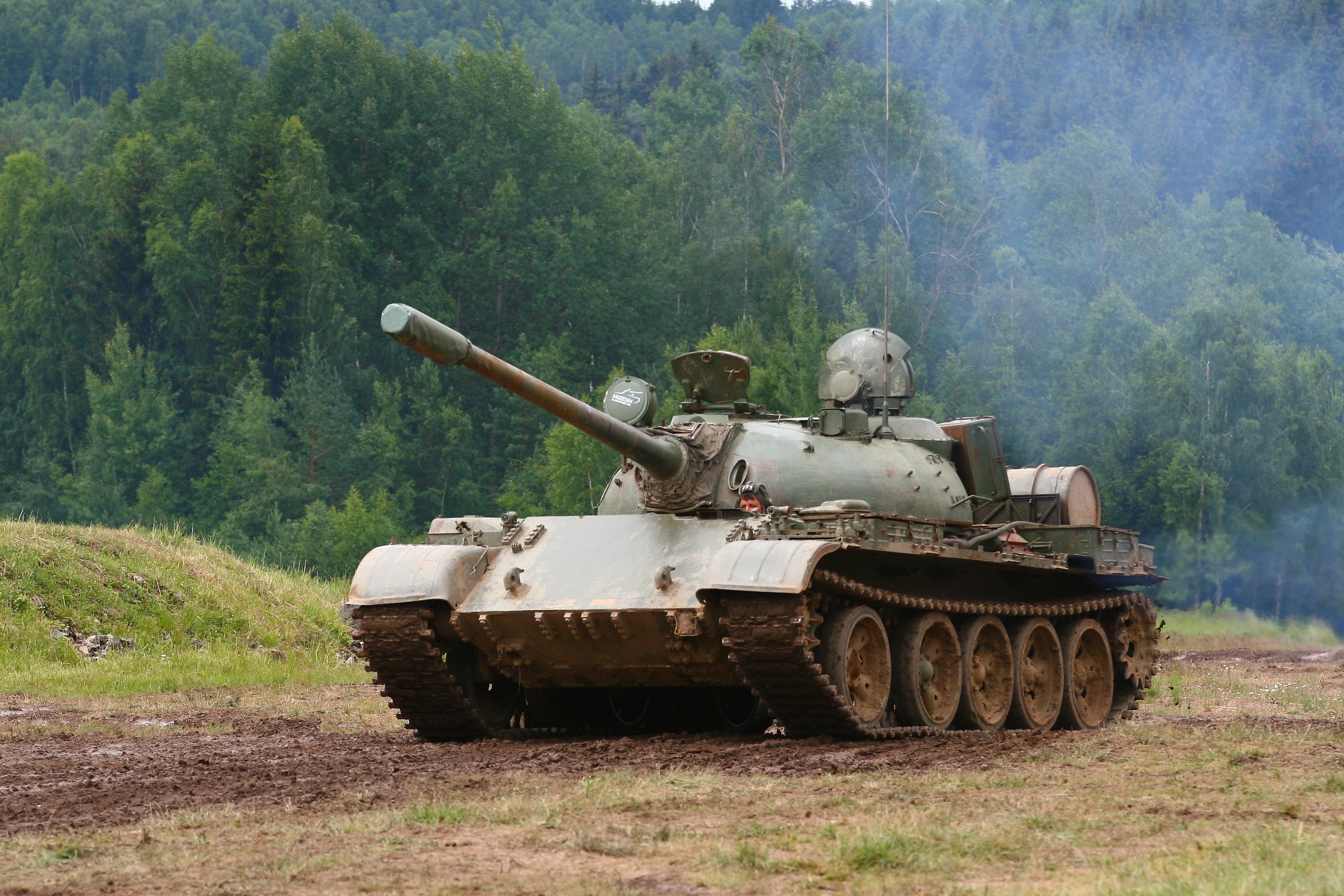
Russian author Kholyavasky considers the T-55 a second generation tank

In the late 1990s, the Russian author Gennady Lvovich Kholyavasky describes a total of five generations of main battle tanks; with the first starting in 1920 and lasting to the end of World War 2, followed by the second generation covering 1946 to 1960, the third generation lasting from 1961 to 1980 and a fourth generation starting in 1981. As per Kholyavasky, no Russian fourth generation tank was fielded by 1998, but the Challenger 2, the M1A2 Abrams, and Leopard 2A6 can be considered fourth generation tanks. Despite not providing an official end for the fourth generation, the Leclerc was considered a fifth generation main battle tank.

As per Rafał Kopeć from the University of the National Education Commission, Krakow no fourth generation tank had already been fielded by 2016, suggesting that all earlier tanks belong to the earlier three generations based on the system he used for classification. In addition to the three main generations, tanks like the T-64, T-72 and Merkava belong to a generation "two plus" according to Kopeć. In a similar fashion, a generation "three plus" consisting of never fielded prototypes with 140–152 mm guns is defined.

In their 2010 book, the Hungarian authors Ernő Hegedűs and Károly Turcsányi define four generations of main battle tanks. The first generation of main battle tanks has no autoloader, a conventional propulsion system with diesel engine and layered armour. This generation includes tanks like the Challenger and Leopard 2. The second generation of main battle tanks has a similar set-up with layered armour, conventional diesel propulsion systems but features and autoloader; it includes tanks such as the Leclerc and T-72. The third generation of MBTs like the second but uses a conventional propulsion system with a gas turbine instead of a diesel; it includes the T-80, the HSTV(L) and the Stridsvagn 103. Hegedűs and Turcsányi define a fourth generation of main battle tanks, utilizing composite materials in their construction, gas turbines and electromagnetic weapons, with the ACAV-P and FCS-T being examples of implementations of fourth generation tank technologies.

Like Hilmes, military historian Hptm Marc Lenzin, Oberst Peter Forster, Div Fred Heer and Hptm Stefan Bühler from the Swiss Army recognise five generations of post-war main battle tanks, as well as a further four Zwischengenerationen consisting of upgraded versions of older main battle tanks. Tanks are categorised by generation based solely on the rough date of their introduction into service rather than on technical aspects of their design. The first generation covers tanks introduced between 1950 and 1960; the second generation, between 1960 and 1980. The third generation covers tanks introduced between 1980 and 1990, followed by the fourth generation, which lasted from 1990 to 2010. The fifth generation of main battle tanks has been in production since 2010.

== List of main battle tanks by generation ==
Because there is no widely accepted definition of main battle tank generations, it is often difficult to determine which generation a tank belongs to. Depending on the definition used by the author, the same tank may belong to several different generations. For example, according to Hegedűs and Turcsányi, the Leopard 2 is a first-generation main battle tank, whereas Pierre Lamontage of the Canadian Army Command & Staff College places it in the second generation. German author Rolf Hilmes considers the Leopard 2 a third-generation tank, assigning upgraded variants to different Zwischengenerationen (intermediate generations).

Consequently, a tank may be listed as belonging to multiple generations. The name(s) behind the entry refers to the author, so placements based on the same definition can be identified.

Name	Year entered service	Origin	No. built	Mass (tonnes)	Engine power	Generation	Notes
M47 Patton	1951	United States	8,576	41 t	750-810 hp	1st (Hilmes, Kopeć)	
M48 Patton	1952	United States	~12,000	44 t	750-825 hp	1st (Hilmes, Lamontagne, Kopeć)	Hilmes also considers the A1 and A2 models first generation MBTs
Centurion	1945	United Kingdom	4,423	51 t	650 hp	1st (Hilmes, Kopeć, Lamontagne)	
T-44	1944	Soviet Union	1,823	32 t	520 hp	1st (Hilmes)	
T-54	1948	Soviet Union	~87,000	36 t	520-800 hp	1st (Hilmes, Kopeć)	
Type 59	1959	People's Republic of China	9,500	36 t	520 hp	1st (Hilmes)	
Type 61	1961	Japan	560	35 t	570 hp	1st (Hilmes, Kopeć)	
M60	1959	United States	2,205	46 t	750 hp	1st (Lamontagne) 2nd (Hilmes, Kopeć)	
M60A1	1961	United States	7,948	47.7 t	750 hp	2nd (Hilmes)	
Chieftain	1966	United Kingdom	1,896	55 t	750 hp	1st (Lamontagne) 2nd (Hilmes, Kopeć)	
Vickers Mk. 1 Vijayanta	1965	United Kingdom	2,270	39.5 t	535 hp	2nd (Hilmes)	
T-62	1961	Soviet Union	more than 22,700	37 t	580-620 hp	2nd (Hilmes, Kopeć)	
AMX-30	1966	France	3,571	36 t	680-720 hp	2nd (Hilmes, Kopeć)	
Leopard 1	1965	West-Germany	4,744	42 t	830 hp	1st (Lamontagne) 2nd (Hilmes, Kopeć, Lenzin et al.)	Hilmes also considered the A1, A2, and A3 second generation MBTs
Panzer 61	1965	Switzerland	150	39 t	630 hp	2nd (Hilmes, Kopeć, Lenzin et al.)	
Stridsvagn 103	1967	Sweden	290	42.5 t	290 hp (diesel) + 489 hp (gas turbine)	2nd (Hilmes, Kopeć, Lenzin et al.) 3rd (Hegedűs et al)	
M60A2	1973	United States	526-540	47.2 t	750 hp	1st Zwischengeneration (Hilmes, Lenzin et al.)	
M60A3	1979	United States	~5,400	49.5 t	750 hp	1st Zwischengeneration (Hilmes, Lenzin et al.)	
Vickers Mk. 3	1977	United Kingdom	226	39.5 t	720 hp	1st Zwischengeneration (Hilmes)	
T-64	1966	Soviet Union	~13,000	38-42 t	700 hp	1st Zwischengeneration (Hilmes) Generation 2+ (Kopeć)	Hilmes also considers the T-64A to be a tank of the 1st ZwischengenerationProduction number for all variants.
T-72	1973	Soviet Union	~25,000	41-44.5 t	780-840 hp	1st Zwischengeneration (Hilmes, Lenzin et al.) 2nd (Hegedűs et al.) Generation 2+ (Kopeć)	Production number for all variants
AMX-30B2	1979	France	700	37 t	720 hp	1st Zwischengeneration (Hilmes, Lenzin et al.)	
Leopard 1A4	1974	Germany	250	42 t	830 hp	1st Zwischengeneration (Hilmes, Lenzin et al.)	
OF-40	1977	Italy	39	45.5 t	830 hp	1st Zwischengeneration (Hilmes)	
Panzer 68	1971	Switzerland	390	40.8 t	660 hp	1st Zwischengeneration (Hilmes)	
Type 74	1975	Japan	873	38 t	750 hp	1st Zwischengeneration (Hilmes)	
Merkava 1	1979	Israel	250	61 t	908 hp	1st Zwischengeneration (Hilmes)	
Merkava 2	1983	Israel	580	62 t	950 hp	1st Zwischengeneration (Hilmes) Generation 2+ (Kopeć)	
Tanque Argentino Mediano	1983	Argentina; West-Germany	280	30.5 t	720 hp	1st Zwischengeneration (Hilmes)	
T-64B	1976	Soviet Union	~6,000	40.6 t	700 hp	2nd Zwischengeneration (Hilmes, Lenzin et al.)	
T-80	1976	Soviet Union	~300	42.5 t	1,000 hp	2nd Zwischengeneration (Hilmes, Lenzin et al.) 3rd (Kopeć, Hegedűs et al.)	
T-80B	1978	Soviet Union	~5,390	42-43 t	1,000-1,100 hp	2nd Zwischengeneration (Hilmes)	
Type 85	1988	People's Republic of China	~300	44 t	730 - 790 hp	2nd Zwischengeneration (Hilmes, Lenzin)	
Leopard 1A5	1986	West-Germany	1,587	42 t	830 hp	2nd Zwischengeneration (Hilmes)	
Panzer 68/88	1988	Switzerland	195	41.7 t	660 hp	2nd Zwischengeneration (Hilmes, Lenzin et al)	
Merkava 3	1989	Israel	780	63.5 t	1,200 hp	2nd Zwischengeneration (Hilmes) 3rd (Kopeć)	
M1 Abrams	1980	United States	3,268	54.4-55.3 t	1,500 hp	3rd (Hilmes, Kopeć)	
M1A1 Abrams	1981	United States	5,000-5,800	57.2-59.5 t	1,500 hp	2nd (Lamontagne) 3rd (Hilmes)	
Challenger 1	1984	United Kingdom	420	62 t	1,200 hp	1st (Hegedűs et al) 2nd (Lamontagne) 3rd (Hilmes, Kopeć)	
Challenger 2	1998	United Kingdom	447	64 t	1,200 hp	3rd (Hilmes) 3rd Zwischengeneration (Lenzin et al.) 4th (Kholyavasky)	
T-80U/UD	1985-87	Soviet Union	~1,130	46 t	1,000-1,200 hp	2nd Zwischengeneration (Lenzin et al.) 3rd (Hilmes)	
Leopard 2	1979	West-Germany	~3,600	55.15 t	1,500 hp	1st (Hegedűs et al.) 2nd (Lamontagne) 3rd (Hilmes, Kopeć)	
Type 90	1990	Japan	341	50.2 t	1,500 hp	3rd (Hilmes, Kopeć)	
C1 Ariete	1995	Italy	200	54 t	1,270 hp	3rd (Hilmes, Kopeć) 4th (Lenzin et al.)	
Type 98	1999	People's Republic of China	~40	51 t	1,200 hp	3rd (Hilmes)	
K1 Type 88	1987	South Korea	1,511	51-55 t	1,200 hp	3rd (Hilmes, Kopeć)	
Leclerc	1992	France	~862	54 t	1,500 hp	2nd (Hegedűs et al.) 3rd (Lamontagne, Kopeć) 4th (Hilmes, Lenzin et al.)	
M1A2 Abrams	1992	United States	1,500-1,700	62.5 t	1,500hp	3rd (Lamontagne) 3rd Zwischengeneration (Hilmes, Lenzin et al.) 4th (Kholyavasky)	
M1A2 SEP v1	1999	United States	600+	63 t	1,500 hp	3rd Zwischengeneration (Hilmes)	
Leopard 2A5/A6	1995	Germany	1,164	59-64 t	1,500 hp	3rd (Lamontagne) 3rd Zwischengeneration (Hilmes, Lenzin et al.) 4th (Kholyavasky)	
T-84	1999	Ukraine	10	46 t	1,200 hp	3rd Zwischengeneration (Hilmes)	
T-90	1992	Russia	~120	46 t	840 hp	3rd (Kholyavasky) 3rd Zwischengeneration (Hilmes, Lenzin et al.)	
PT-91 Twardy	1993	Poland	~285	46 t	1,000 hp	3rd Zwischengeneration (Lenzin et al.)	
Type 99	2001	People's Republic of China	~1,300	51 t	1,500 hp	3rd Zwischengeneration (Lenzin et al.)	
Al-Khalid	2001	Pakistan	~300	46 t	1,200 hp	3rd Zwischengeneration (Hilmes, Lenzin et al.)	
Arjun Mk. 1	2004	India	124	58.5 t	1,400 hp	3rd Zwischengeneration (Lenzin et al.)	
Merkava 4	2004	Israel	320	65 t	1,500 hp	3rd (Kopeć) 3rd Zwischengeneration (Hilmes, Lenzin et al.)	
T-14 Armata	2021	Russia	less than 100	55 t	1,500 hp	5th (Lenzin et al.)	
K2 Black Panther	2014	South Korea	more than 440	55-58 t	1,500 hp	5th (Lenzin et al.)	
Type 10	2012	Japan	117	44 t	1,200 hp	5th (Lenzin et al.)	
Altay	2025	Turkey	5	65 t	1,500 hp	5th (Lenzin et al.)	
Type 99A	2011	People's Republic of China	1,300	55 t	1,500 hp	4th Zwischengeneration (Lenzin et al.)	
Arjun Mk. 2	-	India	-	68 t	1,400 hp	4th Zwischengeneration (Lenzin et al.)	
M1A2 SEP v3 Abrams	2017	United States	690	66 t	1,500 hp	4th Zwischengeneration (Lenzin et al.)	
Leopard 2A7	2014	Germany	254	63-67.5 t	1,500 hp	4th Zwischengeneration (Lenzin et al.)	
T-72B3	2013	Russia	1,000 - 1,700	46-47 t	1,130hp	4th Zwischengeneration (Lenzin et al.)	
T-80BVM	2018	Russia	250-300	46-48 t	1,260 hp	4th Zwischengeneration (Lenzin et al.)	
T-90M	2020	Russia	100+	52 t	1,130 hp	4th Zwischengeneration (Lenzin et al.)	

== See also ==
- Armored bulldozer
- Armoured car
- Armoured personnel carrier (APC)
- Armoured fighting vehicle (AFV)
- Armoured fighting vehicle classification
- Armoured recovery vehicle
- Armoured vehicle-launched bridge
- ASM Program (cancelled due to the end of the Cold War)
- Cruiser tank
- Future Combat Systems Manned Ground Vehicles
- Future Combat Systems
- Future Force Unit of Action
- Heavy tank
- Improvised fighting vehicle
- Infantry fighting vehicle (IFV)
- Infantry mobility vehicle
- Infantry tank
- Light tank
- List of armoured fighting vehicles
- List of armoured trains
- List of main battle tanks by country
- List of modern armoured fighting vehicles
- List of U.S. military vehicles by model number
- Medium Mine Protected Vehicle
- Medium Tank
- Military engineering vehicle
- Reconnaissance vehicle
- Super-heavy tank
- Tank destroyer
- Tankette

== General and cited references ==
- Hilmes, Rolf (1983). Kampfpanzer: Die Entwickelungen der Nachkriegszeit (in German). Frankfurt am Main: Verlag Soldat und Technik. ISBN 3-524-89001-6. OCLC 13410347.
- Hunnicutt, R. P. (1984). Patton: A History of the American Main Battle Tank. Novato, Calif.: Presidio Press. ISBN 0-89141-230-1. OCLC 471892846.
- Lamontagne, J. G. Pierre (2003). Are the Days of the Main Battle Tank Over? (PDF) (Master of Defence Studies). Toronto: Canadian Forces College.
