= Type 80/88 main battle tank =

Type 80/Type 88
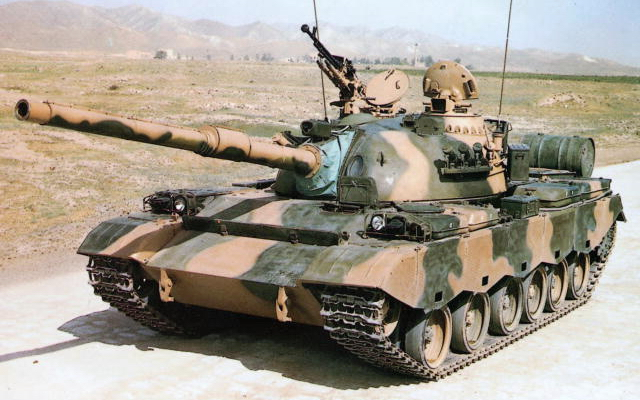
- Type 80 with 105mm rifled gun
- Type: Main battle tank
- Place of origin: China

Service history
- In service: 1988–present
- Used by: See Operators
- Wars: See Operational history

Production history
- Designed: 1978 (Type 80); 1981–1987 (Type 88)
- Manufacturer: Norinco
- Variants: Type 80; Type 85; Type 88

Specifications
- Mass: 38 tonne (Type 80/88); 39.5 tonne (Type 85); 44 tonne (Type 85-III)
- Length: 6.325 m (vehicle hull); 9.336m (gun forward; Type 80/88); 10.369m (gun forward; Type 85-III)
- Width: 3.372 m
- Height: 2.29 m
- Crew: 4 (Type 80/88); 3 (Type 85-IIAP/Type 88C)
- Armor: Type 80: Cast Steel Turret Type 85II/Type 88: Welded Steel/Composite Armor Turret. May be fitted with Explosive Reactive Armor
- Main armament: ZPL-79 105mm rifled gun (Type 80); ZPL-83 105mm rifled gun (Type 88); ZPL-83A 105mm rifled gun (Type 85/88B); ZPL-94 105mm rifled gun (Type 88A); ZPT-88C 125mm smoothbore gun (Type 85IIA/Type 88C)
- Secondary armament: Type 59 7.62 mm coaxial machine gun Type 59 12.7 mm air-defence machine gun
- Engine: 12150ZL Diesel; 730 hp (537 kW)
- Power/weight: 18.9hp/ton (Type 80/85/88)
- Fuel capacity: 1433L
- Operational range: 500 km (Type 80/85/88); 400 km (Type 88C)
- Maximum speed: 57 km/h

The Type 80 (Chinese: 80式; pinyin: Bālíngshì) and the Type 88 (Chinese: 88式; pinyin: Bābāshì) are a family of Chinese second-generation main battle tanks (MBTs). They are also known as the ZTZ80 and ZTZ88.

== History ==
In the 1970s China's primary MBT in service was the Type 59, a licensed copy of the T-54 medium tank which was obsolete compared to contemporary Soviet and Western designs. The People's Liberation Army (PLA) thus requested new tanks that could match Soviet designs, which led to the development of the Type 69 medium tank that had new technology such as a laser rangefinder and two-plane stabilization. However, the Type 69 failed to satisfy PLA requirements and was only an export success that saw limited domestic service. Even then, the Type 69 was barely able to meet export requirements. Further tank development commenced which would lead to the Type 80 and Type 90 prototypes.

=== Type 80 and Type 85 development ===
The Type 80 began development in 1978, building upon the foundation that was laid during the development of the Type 69 tank. Development took place in Factory 617 and Institute 201, Factory 447 and 616 were also involved. It was the first Chinese tank to be classified as a "Main Battle Tank". The Type 80 was a prototype which did not enter production but was the basis of improved variants such as the Type 80-I, Type 80-II and Type 85, creating a family of MBTs. The Type 80 used the turret from the Type 79 MBT but with a thickened turret front.

The Type 80-II was a prototype intended for foreign export but was unable to garner interest among foreign buyers. When sent overseas for trials, the Type 80-II's engine failed to perform satisfactorily. In a trial between the Type 80-II and the AMX-32, the Type 80-II required 8 hours to change its engine, while the AMX-32 only required an hour. This spurred Norinco's engineers to develop a brand-new export tank on the Type 80 chassis. They did this by mating a newly designed welded turret to the Type 80 chassis, in contrast to the original cast turret of the Type 80. Due to export restrictions, the Chinese were unable to use an imported 105mm gun on the Type 85 tank. This led to the development of the first locally designed 105mm gun. This was marketed as the "Storm" series of main battle tanks and later named the Type 85 domestically. However, the first Storm tanks also failed to gather interest among potential buyers. This led to further upgrades in the Type 85 to its engine from 730 hp to 800 hp and changing to a semi-auto transmission. This upgraded Type 85 would eventually be designated the Type 85-II/Storm-II. The Type 85-II would catch the interest of the Pakistani government and was finally exported under the designation Type 85-IIAP or Type 85-IIM. While the Type 85 should have been named the Type 88 by its year of development, it was eventually decided that it would be retroactively named the Type 85 due to its more dated specifications.

=== Type 88 development ===
None of the Type 80 prototypes entered domestic service.

The Type 80 variant that entered PLA service was designated the Type 88. Visually resembled the Type 80-II. Improved variants known as the Type 88B and Type 88A later entered service. Both variants of the tank employed the same chassis and round turret but had differences in their firepower and fire control system and the ability to mount explosive reactive armour (ERA).

The Type 85-III was designated the Type 88C for domestic production. The Type 88C was renamed as the Type 96 and further upgraded in the 1990s and 2000s.

As of 2021, the Type 88A is still in active PLA service.

== Design ==
=== Overview ===
The chief engineer of the Type 80 was Fang Wei Xian, who also designed the Type 69 and Type 90 tank families.

The Type 80 inherited the design philosophy of the Type 69/79 which combined a Soviet-style chassis and turret with Western technology. Like the Type 69 series, the initial Type 80 design possessed a hemispherical turret similar to the T-54/55. Another similarity was that the driver sat in the left forward section of the hull. However, the Type 80 used a licence-built L7 rifled gun instead of the Soviet 100 mm rifled gun.

The Type 80 family marked a number of firsts for Chinese tanks. Beginning from the Type 85, they were the first Chinese tanks to use a welded turret, allowing it to make use of composite armor. It was also the first tank to use six road wheels instead of five for a smoother ride at higher speeds. The Type 80 was the first Chinese tank to have applique composite armour. This was later integrated into the turret in the Type 85. Type 85-III was the first Chinese tank to use both composite armor (in its turret) and explosive reactive armour (ERA).

The Type 85-I (Storm-1) series had a new welded turret design that was angular instead of the familiar bowl-shape. The Type 85IIAP/M was the first tank in the series to be equipped with a 125 mm smoothbore gun.

=== Armaments ===
Type 80 served as a testbed for the imported ZPL-79 105 mm rifled gun. On Type 88 and Type 88B, the main armament is a dual-axis stabilized ZPL-83 and ZPL-83A 105 mm rifled gun with a fume extractor at its midway point. On Type 88A, the main gun is replaced by a longer, 62-caliber ZPL-94, offering longer range, higher accuracy, and capability to launch laser-guided gun-launched missiles. The main gun has an elevation of -5 to 18 degrees and an electronic turret drive of 20°/s for horizontal control and 6°/s for vertical. The main gun on Type 80 is loaded manually and has a rate of fire of approximately 7 rounds per minute. On Type 88B, a form of assist loader is introduced for quicker and easier reload operations with a reportedly 13 rounds per minute maximum rate of fire.

Secondary armaments for all variants are the same, including one Type 59 12.7 mm heavy machine gun mounted on the turret roof, and one Type 59 7.62 mm coaxial machine gun. The Type 80 and Type 88 can store 44 rounds of ammunition for the main gun. On Type 88B and Type 88A, the tank features redesigned ammo racks with 48 rounds of ammunition. The 12.7 mm heavy machine gun has 300 rounds of ammo, while the coaxial machine gun has 2250 rounds.

=== Electronics ===
The Type 80 tank is equipped with a laser rangefinder, a digital ballistic computer, a power supply, a target angle measurement sensor, a velocity measurement sensor, and a gun positioning sensor. The driver's periscope and gunner sight are fitted with a passive night vision device (1st generation), daylight periscopes. The commander is fitted with one rotating periscope and four additional observation periscopes. The driver and loader have their own periscopes. The commander can override the turret direction. Type 80-I replaced the external laser rangefinder with an integrated multi-function gunner sight. The gunner sight was upgraded to second-generation passive night vision.

The Type 88 tank features an improved Type 37A fire control system. Type 37A features an integrated gunner sight with daylight optics, a passive night vision channel, and a laser range finder. The daylight emergency sight from Type 80 is kept at its original location. The new fire control system has an improved ballistic computer, a new radio communication system, a dual-axis stabilizer, self-diagnosis software, and a second-generation passive night-vision device for the driver and gunner.

The Type 88B and Type 88A tanks are equipped with an improved ISFCS-212 fire control system, with the driver, gunner, and commander all having access to 2nd generation passive night vision devices. The gunner sight is stabilized. Type 88A and later batches of Type 88B had their gunner sight replaced by thermal imaging devices. The fire control computer of Type 88B and Type 88A allows the commander to acquire and engage enemy targets through the optical periscope mounted on the commander's hatch.

=== Protection ===
Starting from Type 80, the tank is protected by composite armor plates mounted on the vehicle's frontal chassis and composite rubber/metal side armor skirts. The turret of Type 80/88 is still made of rolled homogeneous armour, with the exception being the Type 85 series, which is constructed with a welded turret and composite armour layers.

The original prototype of Type 80 had a cutout on the frontal cast turret for a gunner observation sight, similar to the Type 59 tank. This was removed in Type 80-I and Type 88 models with roof-mounted periscopes and fire control sights.

All versions of the Type 80/85/88 tanks are fitted with thermal suppression camouflage paint, a collective NBC protection system, an air filtration and ventilation system, an automatic fire/after-effect suppression system, and 2 sets of four 76mm smoke grenade dischargers.

=== Mobility ===
Type 80 and Type 88 tanks are powered by 12150ZL diesel engine developing 730 hp (537 kW). The maximum road speed is 57 km/h and the average off-road speed is 32 km/h. The power-to-weight ratio is about 18.9 hp/ton. The transmission has 5 forward gears and 1 reverse gear. It has a maximum cruising range of 500 km and can negotiate a gradient of 61% and a side slope of 58%. It can cross a vertical obstacle of 0.8 m and a trench of 2.7m.

== Operational history ==
=== Sudan ===
In 2012 Heglig Crisis, South Sudan deployed T-72AV against Sudan, to which Sudanese Type 85-II-M (designated Al-Bashir) tanks would respond. Upon clashing, 4 T-72s were destroyed, with another 2 badly damaged; no Type 85s were seriously damaged or lost. This resulted from the Type 85-II-M's superior fire control system and ammunition.

Type 85-IIs were used in the Sudanese civil war (2023–present).

=== China–India border crisis ===
Type 88Bs were deployed to the Chinese frontier region during the 2020–2021 China–India skirmishes.

== Variants ==
In Chinese tank development, the "M" or "II" in the designation typically represents a variant primarily intended for export. Tanks for domestic use will have their own Type designation or the "I" suffix as explained below.

=== Type 80 ===
Type 80/Type 80-I

Prototype Chinese second-generation tank design which did not enter production. Uses an older-style round steel cast turret with a new chassis. Four-man crew. Came with NBC protection. The vehicle served as a testbed for the imported ZPL-79 105mm rifled gun. Main difference between Type 80 and Type 80-I was in the fire control system with the original range finding laser mounted on the gun mantlet incorporated into the tank commander's gun sight.

Type 80-II

Type 80 was developed for export purposes. Type 80-II had a new 12150ZL(G) engine developing 790 hp (588 kW), new transmission, air ventilation system, improved vehicle radio system, and thermal smoke generator.

=== Type 85/Storm ===
Type 85-I

Type 80-II chassis with welded turret. Also known as Storm-I. Had a 730 hp engine.

Type 85-II

Type 80/88 chassis with welded turret. Also known as Storm-II. Featured a locally developed ZPL-94 105mm gun, 800 hp engine and semi-automatic transmission.

Type 85-IIA/M

Upgraded variant of the Type 85-II/Storm-2 to suit Pakistan's specifications. The 105mm gun was changed to a 125 mm smooth-bore gun with an autoloader. The original four-man crew was reduced to a three-man crew. Pakistan had originally wanted a 1000 hp engine, but this was not available in China at the time. Export designation to Pakistan was Type 85-IIM or Type 85-IIAP (The "P" standing for "Pakistan").

Type 85-III

Developed in 1993. Upgrade for the Storm-II/Type 85-IIM with 1000 hp engine, ERA, improved FCS, and thermal night sight. It used the transmission from the T-72 tank. In 1994, when China competed against the Ukrainian T-84 for export to a tropical country, the Type 85-III performed better but suffered a higher number of faults and was thus not chosen.

Type-85UG

Pakistani upgraded version of the Type-85IIA. Upgrades include ability to fire NAIZA-DU & APFSDS-T rounds along with Ukrainian Kombat ATGMs. Moreover, it features new LRF ballistic computers and fire-control systems and a Solid-State autoloader made by CARE. The sights of the tank commander, gunner & driver were also replaced with newer ones made by Thales.

=== Type 88 ===
Type 88

Type 88 was the first design of the Type 88 series. This variant never went into mass production.

Type 88B

Despite the name, Type 88B was the first mass-produced Type 88 variant. The Type 80 underwent further development and was accepted into PLA service in 1988, hence its designation was changed to Type 88. It was mounted with ZPL-83A 105mm gun which could fire all 105mm NATO gun ammunition.

Type 88A

Later variant of the Type 88B. Distinguished from Type 88B by type of 105 mm gun mounted. The Type 88A mounts a 62 caliber ZPL-94 105mm gun that is longer than the NATO L7 cannon and is capable of firing ATGMs.

=== Type 88C ===
Type 85-III was produced for domestic service in the PLA. Uses an angular welded turret. Armed with a 125 mm ZPT-98 smoothbore gun with an autoloader. Equipped with JSFCS-212 fire control system (FCS) (with laser rangefinder, ballistics computer, stabilized gunner's sight and dual-axis gun stabilization), and Type 889B radio with range of up to 30 km. Later renamed to Type 96.

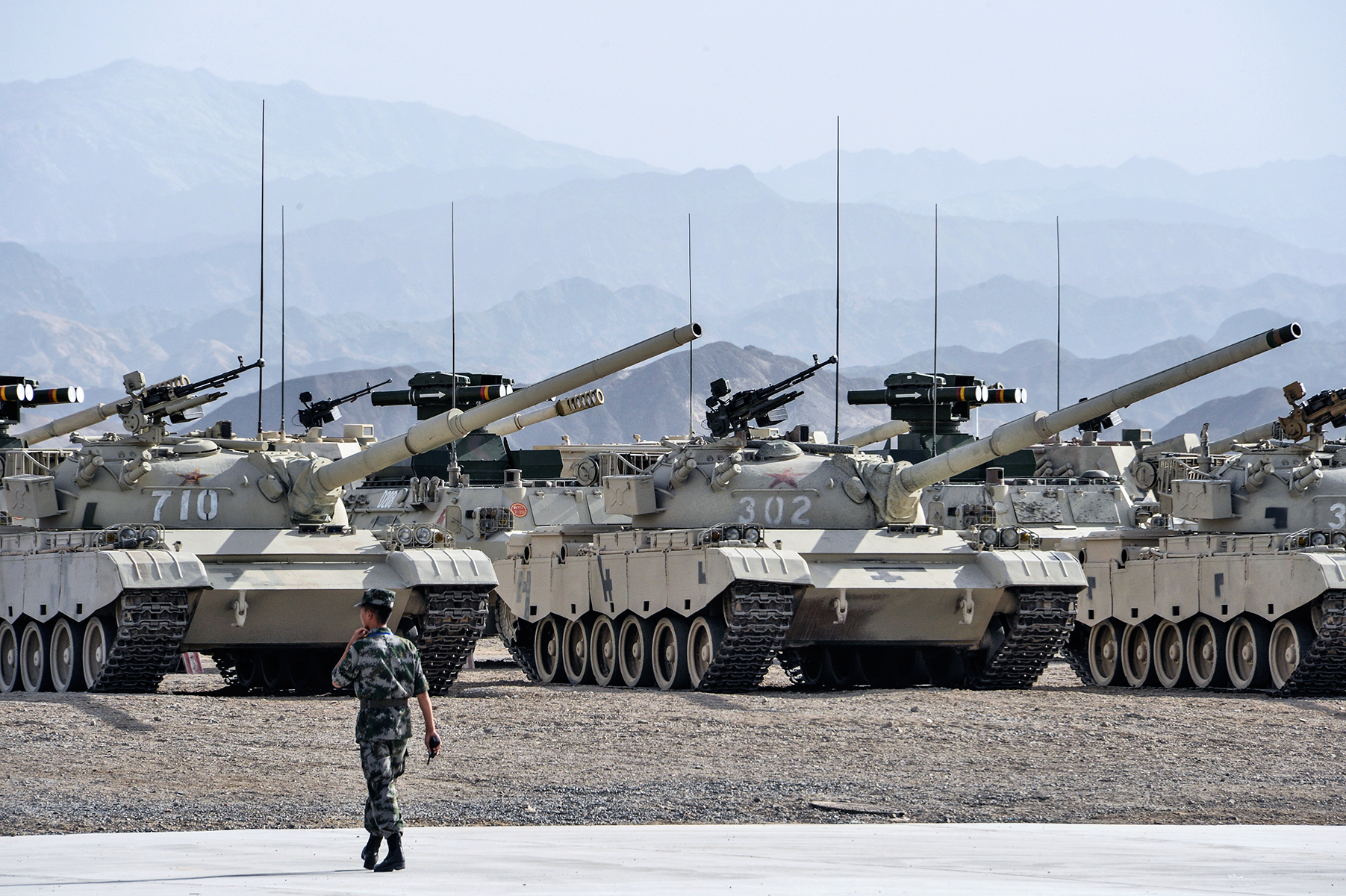
Type 88A tanks

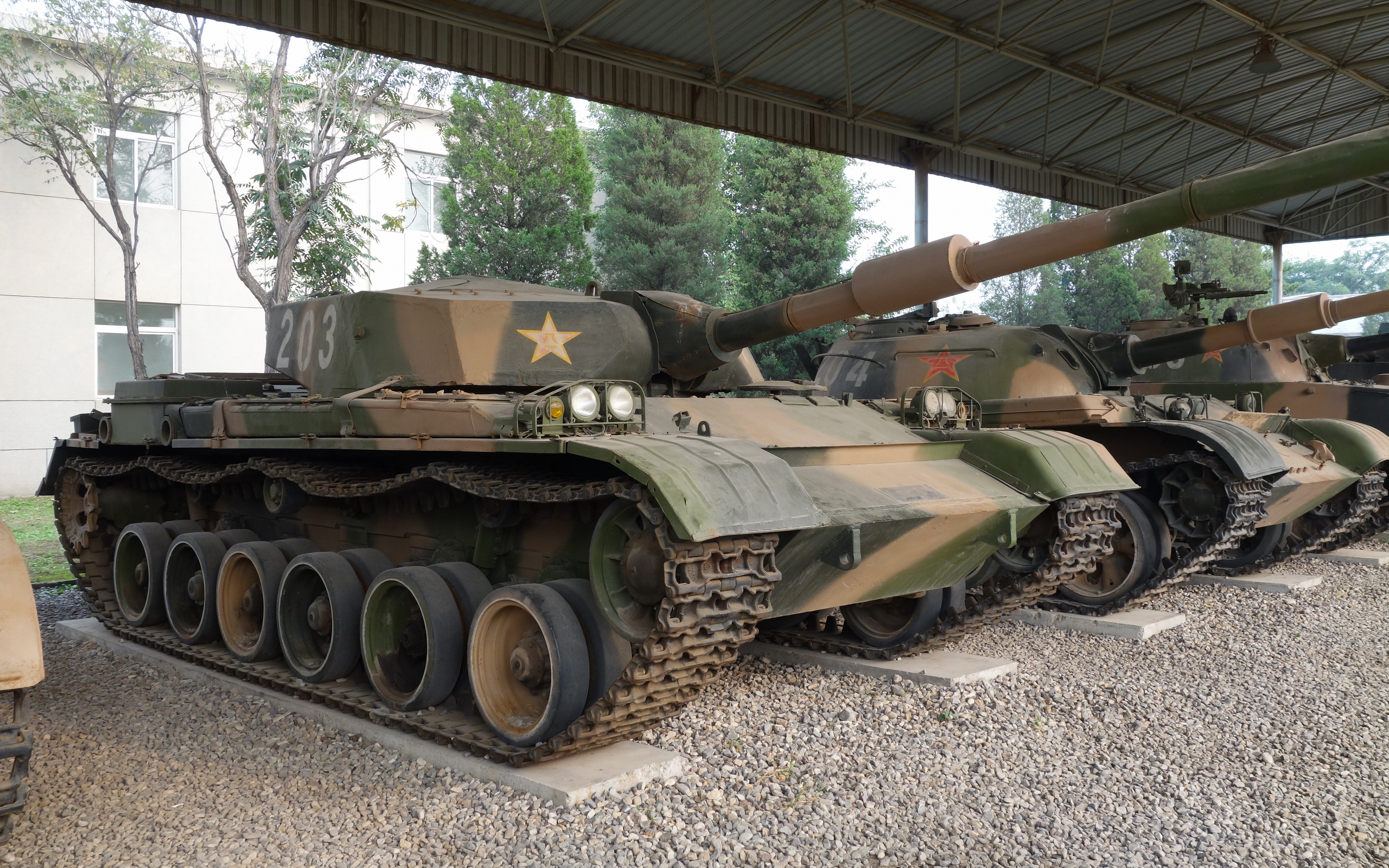
Storm-1/Type 85-I. Prototype designation for export. Never mass-produced. Welded turret on Type 80 chassis.

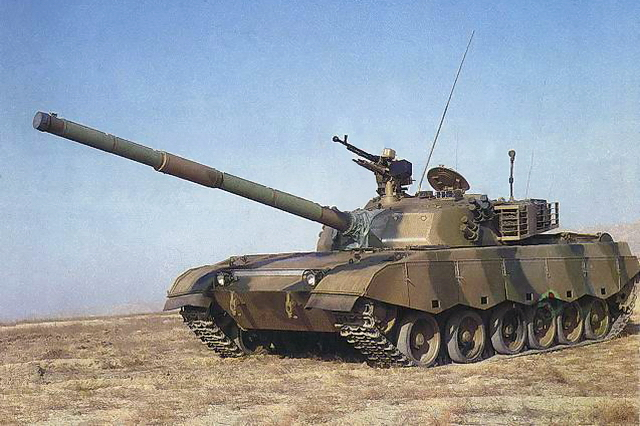
Type 85-IIM variant with 125mm gun

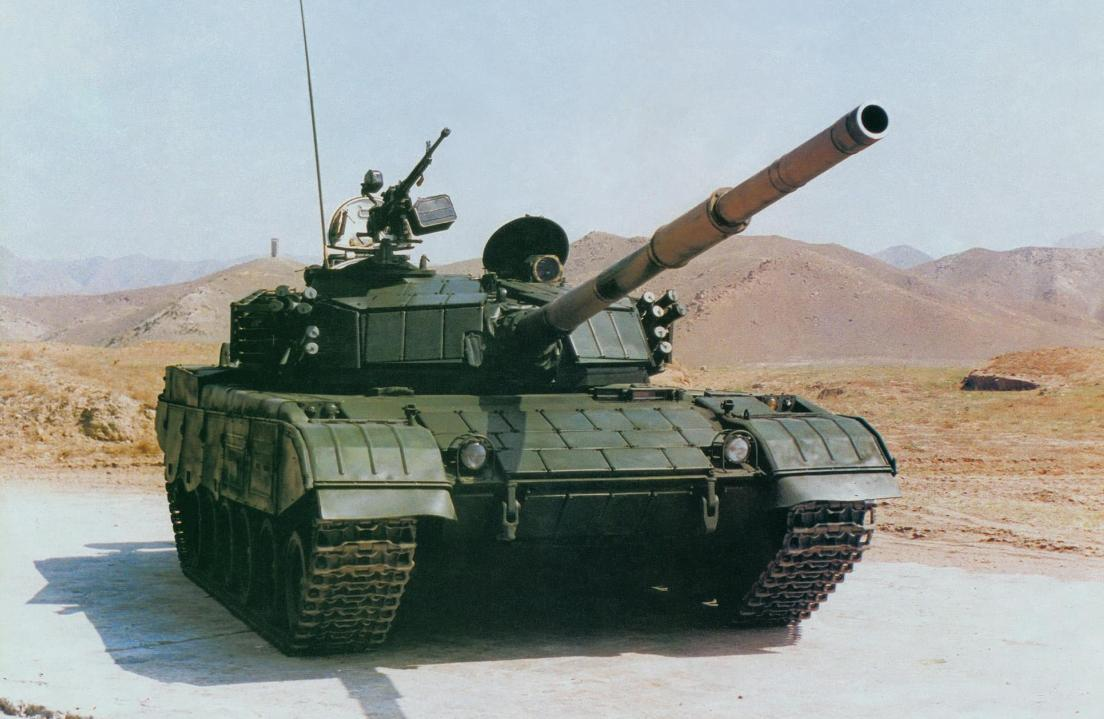
Type 85-ІІІ

== Operators ==
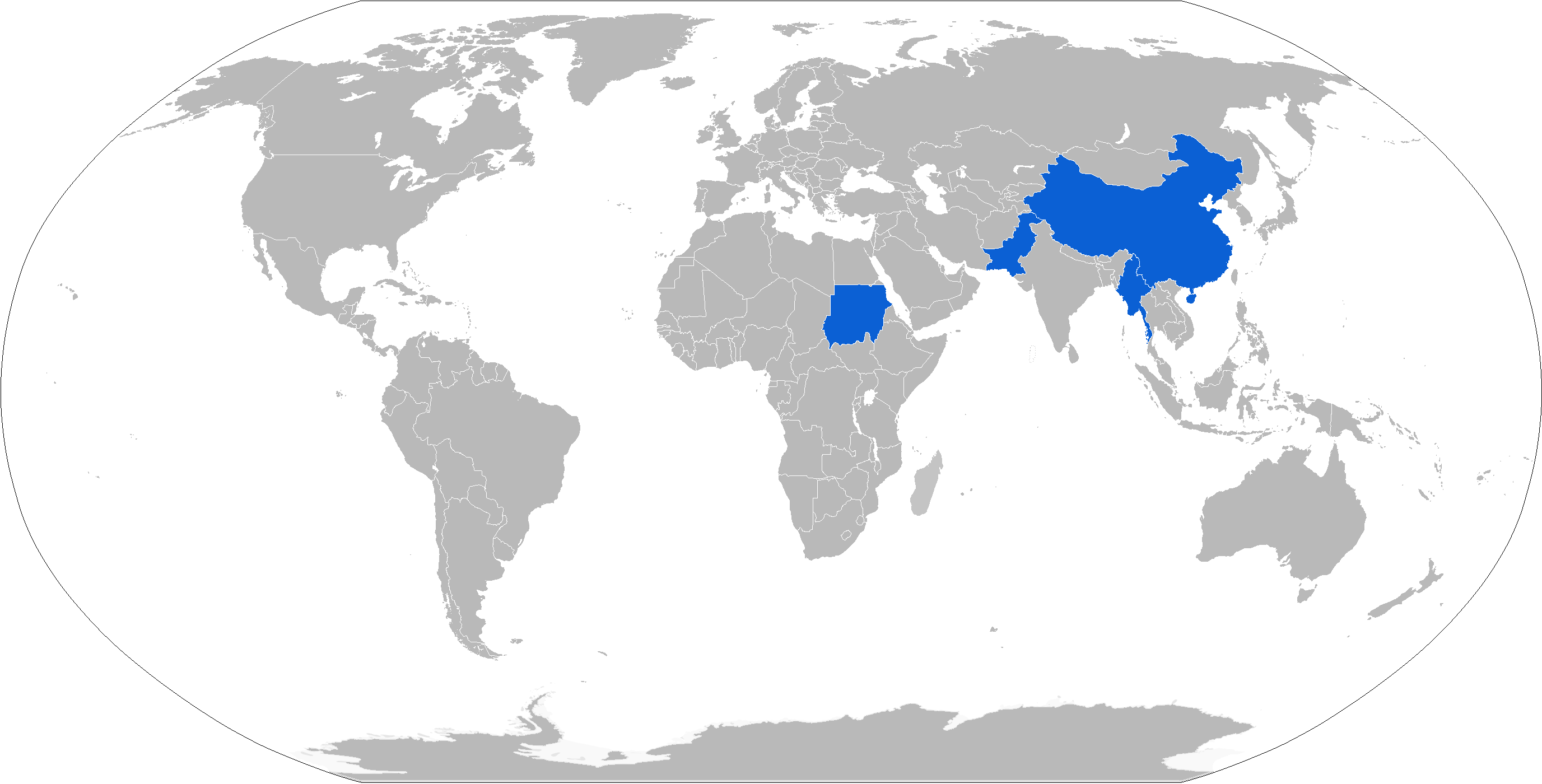
Map of Type 88-85 operators in blue with former operators in red

China

300 Type 88A/B as of 2020.

Pakistan

268 Type 85-IIAP confirmed as of 2024. Being Upgraded to Type-85UG/T-85UG standards. Some sources estimate around 400 Type 85s in service.

Sudan

10 Type 85-II-M (local designation Al-Bashir) as of 2020.

Uganda

~5 Type 85-II-M received in 2008.

== See also ==
- Al-Khalid tank
- Type 69 tank
- Type 96 tank

Contemporary tanks of similar performance

- AMX-30 – (France)
- Type 74 tank – (Japan)
- Leopard 1 – (Germany)
- M-84 – (Yugoslavia)
- M60A3 – (United States)
- OF-40 – (Italy)
- T-62 – (Soviet Union)
- T-64 – (Soviet Union)
- T-72 – (Soviet Union)
- Al-Zarrar – (Pakistan)
