= Al-Khalid tank =

Pakistani main battle tank

Al-Khalid/VT-1A
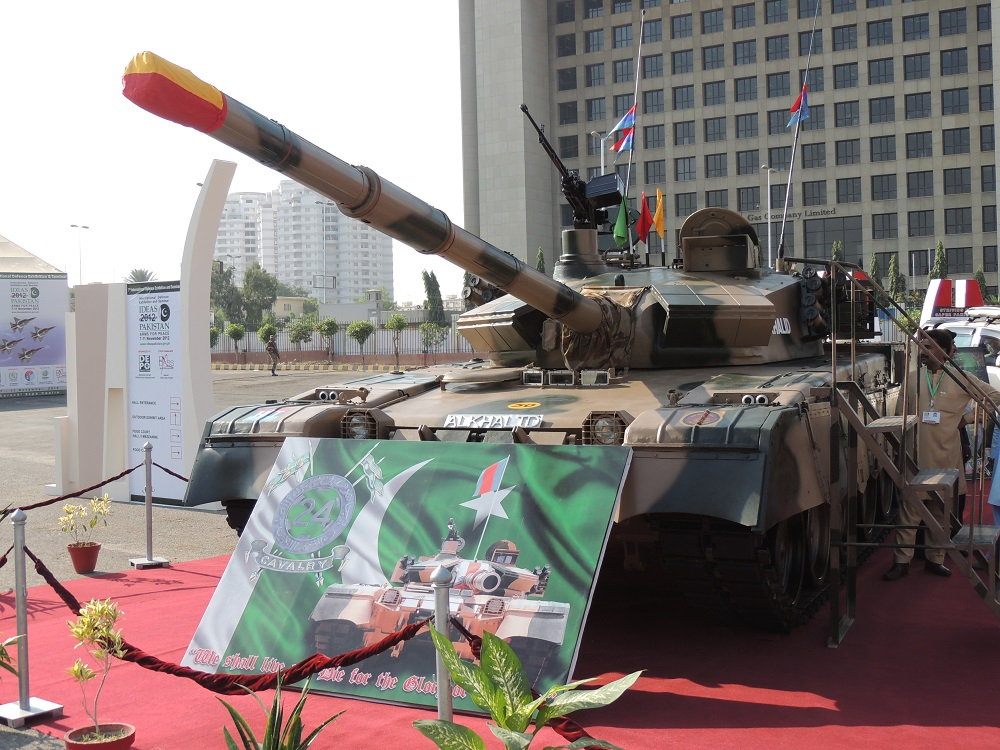
- Al-Khalid in IDEAS 2012
- Type: Main battle tank
- Place of origin: Pakistan / China

Service history
- In service: 2001 – present
- Used by: Operators

Production history
- Designer: Norinco
- Designed: 1993–1999
- Manufacturer: Norinco (VT-1A/MBT-2000, Type 96-IIM); Heavy Industries Taxila (Al Khalid, Al Khalid-1)
- Unit cost: US$4.7 million – US$5.8 million in 2011
- Produced: 2001 – 2014 (Al-Khalid) 2020 – present (Al-Khalid-1)
- Variants: Pakistani: Al-Khalid; Al-Khalid I; Chinese: Type 90-IIM / MBT-2000; VT-1A

Specifications
- Mass: 46 t (51 short tons)
- Length: 10.07 m (33 ft 0 in)
- Width: 3.50 m (11 ft 6 in)
- Height: 2.40 m (7 ft 10 in)
- Crew: 3
- Armour: Composite armour, RHA, ERA
- Main armament: Al-Khalid: 125 mm smoothbore gun, 39 rounds Al-Khalid I: 125 mm smoothbore gun, 49 rounds
- Secondary armament: Al-Khalid: 7.62 mm coaxial machine gun, 3000 rds 12.7 mm external AA machine gun, 500 rds Al-Khalid I: 7.62 mm coaxial machine gun, 7,100 rds 12.7 mm external AA machine gun, 1,500 rds
- Engine: KMDB 6TD-2 6-cylinder diesel 1,200 hp (890 kW)
- Power/weight: 26 hp/ton
- Transmission: 7 forward and 4 reverse gears, Semi-automatic
- Suspension: Torsion bar with hydraulic dampers
- Operational range: 500 km (310 mi) combat range
- Maximum speed: 72 km/h (45 mph)

The Al-Khalid/VT-1A (Urdu: الخالد ٹینک — Al-Xālid Ṫaiŋk, pronounced [əlˈxaːlɪd̪ ʈɛːŋk], lit. 'The Eternal Tank') is a main battle tank family developed jointly by Norinco of China and Heavy Industries Taxila of Pakistan. The tank is based on the Type 90-II tank and its predecessor. Approximately 300 Al-Khalid main battle tanks were produced by 2014. The tank has been exported by China to Bangladesh, Morocco and Myanmar. The VT-1A is also marketed as the MBT-2000.

The Bangladesh Army ordered 44 MBT-2000s from China in 2011. The Norinco-made MBT-2000 is also used by the Royal Moroccan Army. It was trialed by the Peruvian Army for possible acquisition, but was not purchased due to financial problems.

Operated by a crew of three and armed with a 125 mm smooth-bore tank gun that is reloaded automatically, the tank uses a fire-control system and night-fighting equipment. Al-Khalid is named after the 7th-century Muslim commander Khalid bin al-Walid (592–642 AD).

The current production variant of the Al-Khalid uses a diesel engine and transmission supplied by the KMDB design bureau of Ukraine. The first production models entered service with the Pakistan Army in 2001. The country placed an order with Ukraine to further upgrade the tanks with a new engine.

== History ==
The Chinese People's Liberation Army was concerned about the Soviet threat, required an improved main battle tank (MBT) to replace the old and obsolete Type 59 tank. Thus, in 1980, Norinco was formed and the Inner Mongolia First Machine Group Corporation was tasked with developing a series of new tanks.

A joint development deal was signed with Pakistan in January 1990. Initial Chinese-built prototypes were tested in Pakistan in August 1991. Pakistan completed its manufacturing plant at Taxila in 1992. Pakistan spent more than US$20 million over the next eight years on the co-development of a model suitable for its needs and on creating a capability to manufacture it locally. The Project Director at Heavy Industries Taxila (HIT) Brigadier Nasir Mahmood SI(M) led Pakistan's first indigenously produced tank from conception to production. His team modified the tank to accept a foreign-built engine. Several different prototypes were evaluated.

In light of high ambient temperatures and the fine sand or dust that would be encountered in operational areas such as the deserts of southern Pakistan, the development of high performance cooling and air filtering systems was emphasized during the planning stage of the project. Implementation of a hydro-gas suspension system was considered but, after technical evaluation, it was found to be impractical due to various limitations such as problems with reliability and maintainability. Installation of the Renk 304 transmission was also considered but discarded.

An early version was armed with a Chinese gun and fire-control system, and had a German-designed MTU-396 diesel engine which was built under licence in China. Another version was equipped with a more advanced Western digital fire-control system and powered by a Perkins 1,200 hp (890 kW) Condor diesel engine (as in the British Challenger) and SESM ESM500 automatic transmission (as in the French Leclerc). This version was considered too expensive, and under-performed in the extreme heat of southern Pakistan. Finally, a version was tested with the compact Ukrainian 6TD-2 1,200 hp diesel engine. This configuration was chosen by Pakistan for the production version of the tank and came to be known as Al-Khalid.

The final tank design resulting from a decade of co-operative development was designated Type 90-IIM. The Chinese company Norinco showed the new Type 90-IIM during the March 2001 Abu Dhabi Defense Expo, under the export name MBT 2000. The version powered by the Ukrainian engine, intended for domestic production in Pakistan, was named Al-Khalid.

During the development period, Heavy Industries Taxila gained experience after building the Type 85-IIAP under Chinese licence and prepared to begin production of the Al-Khalid tank in 1999. A pilot batch of fifteen tanks was inducted into the 31st Cavalry Regiment of Pakistan's Armoured Corps on 20 July 2001. Pakistan signed a contract with Ukraine's Malyshev Factory in May 2002 for the delivery of 315 KMDB 6TD-2 diesel engines over three years. An additional batch of Al-Khalid tanks was delivered on 23 September 2004. Pakistan planned to build a total of 600 Al-Khalid tanks for its armed forces.

In December 2017, HIT officials told the Pakistan Senate that budgetary constraints had reduced the output of the tank to 18 per year on average.

On July 28, 2020, the Pakistan Army inducted the first Al Khalid-I main battle tank into its Armoured Corps Regiment. The handing over ceremony of the tank, which is an upgraded version of Al Khalid tank, was held at HIT.

== Unveiling ==
The Al-Khalid was unveiled on 17 July 1991 by the Prime Minister Nawaz Sharif and Chief of Army Staff Mirza Aslam Beg during a ceremony at the Heavy Rebuild Factory (HRF), Taxila. In his speech, the Prime Minister said that the completion of the project was a big step towards self-reliance. The Army Chief said that for the first time in history, not only had technology been transferred to Pakistan, but the design was also made by Pakistani engineers themselves.

== Design ==
=== Armament ===
Al-Khalid is designed with a 125 mm bore, 48 calibre long smoothbore, autofrettaged and chrome-plated gun barrel which is manufactured from high strength electroslag remelting steel. The gun is then put under stringent quality control process to ensure standard barrel life of 1,100 rounds EFC; barrels that cannot pass this test are rejected. This gun provides very high internal chamber pressures for APFSDS, HEAT-FS and guided missiles. The gun can also fire the following types of conventional ammunition: APFSDS, HEAT-FS, and HE-FS. The gun is a modified variant of both the ZPT-98 and KBA-3 series of 125 mm smooth bore gun for Al-Khalid MBT which provided compatibility with Ukrainian ATGMs such as Kombat. The gun retains qualities of both Chinese and Ukrainians mated with indigenous design for better and accurate firepower on stationary and moving targets alike. The Gun-launched, laser-guided anti-tank guided missiles can also be launched.

Al-Khalid also fires a Pakistani depleted uranium round, the Naiza 125 mm DU round which gives an armour penetration of 570 mm RHA at 2 km. It is equipped with a muzzle reference system and dual-axis stabilisation system. Elevation and azimuth control is achieved by electro-hydraulic power drives. The automatic ammunition-handling system for the main gun has a 24-round ready-to-fire magazine and can load and fire at a rate of eight rounds per minute.

The tank is also equipped with a 7.62 mm-coaxial machine gun, a 12.7 mm remotely controlled externally mounted air-defence machine gun that can be aimed and fired from within the tank, and 16 smoke grenade launchers(12 Smoke, 4HE).

The gunner is provided with a dual-magnification day sight and the commander with a panoramic sight for all-around independent surveillance. Both sights are dual-axis image stabilised and have independent laser range-finders. The tank has hunter-killer capability, giving the commander the ability to acquire new targets independently while the gunner is engaging another target. The automatic target-tracking system is designed to work when tank and target are both moving. Night vision for the gunner and commander is achieved through a dual-magnification thermal imaging sight. Both sights are integrated with the fire-control system. The production Al-Khalid tank's fire-control system is the ISFCS-122B and is a modified version of the Chinese ISFCS-122 modified with French Assistance by adding features like Auto-tracking and more. In the MBT 2000, the Chinese Norinco fire-control system takes inputs from ten sensors. The ballistic computation time is less than one second. The manufacturer claims routine first round hits on standard 8 ft (2.4 m) square targets at ranges over 2,000 metres.

- Effective range: 200 to 7,000 metres
- Sensor: laser ranging from 200 to 9,990 metres
- French Auto-tracking, interfaced with gunner station, firing four types of munitions, gunner's thermal imaging sight, commander's image intensification night vision sight, gyro-stabilised and UPS power supply system.

Prototypes were demonstrated with various fire-control systems of Chinese and western origin, but the production model of the Al-Khalid MBT's use a modified Chinese fire-control system (FCS) and gun control system (GCS).

The Al-Khalid-1's FCS has been improved and is able to cue up multiple targets at once and has Auto-tracking for both the 125mm Main gun as well as for the 12.7mm Anti-air gun. It is also equipped with the "Integrated Battlefield Management System" (IBMS), named "Rebar", a digital communications system developed domestically by HIT and CARE (Centre for Advanced Research in Engineering). It comprises a flat-screen display mounted inside the tank which communicates with those of other vehicles, including command posts such as the HIT Sakb. It uses a data-link to facilitate secure communication of battlefield information between units, including tank video footage and information from unmanned aerial vehicles.

A project to manufacture the first Pakistani tank gun barrel was started by Pakistan's Strategic Plans Division (SPD) in 2000. In April 2011, it was reported that the first Pakistani-produced tank gun barrel was ready to be delivered to HIT for installation on the Al-Khalid and Al-Zarrar. Previously, HIT imported 125 mm gun barrel blanks from France for the two tanks which would then be machined in Pakistan by HIT. The first Pakistani gun barrel blank was produced at Heavy Mechanical Complex (HMC) in a joint project involving HIT, People's Steel Mills Limited (PSML) and other defence-related organisations. The specialist grade steel was produced at PSML and the resulting steel block was passed on to HMC. HMC then pressed the block to a length of 5 metres and square cross-section, before forging it into a 125 mm smoothbore barrel. The barrel was then heat treated several times in facilities such as a large vertical furnace. The process took 2–3 months and was watched by experts from other defence-related organisations. The barrel was to be capable of firing at 4 rounds per minute as well as being compatible with the autoloader and its 24-round magazine. According to a HIT official, a joint team proved to the Pakistan Army that strict standards would be met before the army approved production of a first batch of 50 gun barrels by HMC. The Pakistani gun barrels would likely be installed on upgraded versions of the Al-Khalid which are under development by HIT. A 200 million PKR contract has been finalised by HIT for the first 50 barrel batch, which is slightly lower than the barrels imported from France. After production of the first batch of local tank gun barrels in 2011, Heavy Mechanical Complex is planning to explore manufacture of artillery guns.

=== Mobility ===
The production model Al-Khalid is powered by a 6TD-2 liquid-cooled diesel engine, designed by the Kharkiv Morozov Design Bureau (KMDB) of Ukraine. The 6TD-2 is a supercharged 6-cylinder engine delivering 1,200 horsepower (890 kW). The 2-stroke design, with the pistons arranged horizontally in an opposed piston configuration, makes the engine very compact and therefore more suitable for being fitted into relatively small vehicles such as the Al-Khalid MBT.

The 6TD-2 is part of a Ukrainian power pack and is capable of semi-automatic power-shifting, the transmission has 7 forward and 4 reverse speeds along with a braking system that incorporates carbon friction brakes and a secondary speed-retarding system. Gear changes are controlled by a torque converter which is made more efficient by addition of an automatic lock-up clutch. There is also a mechanical back-up system for use in emergencies, able to shift 2 gears forward and reverse.

The Al-Khalid is fairly lightweight compared to the Western tanks, weighing 46 tonnes compared to the 60 tonne M1 Abrams and Leopard 2. A power-to-weight ratio of 26.66 hp/tonne gives acceleration from 0 to 32 km/h (0 to 20 mph) in 10 seconds and a maximum speed of 72 km/h, the speed and agility also helping to improve survivability.

A snorkel allows the tank to cross water obstacles up to 5 metres deep, after some preparation by the crew. Navigation is assisted by an inertial navigation system (INS) and a GPS satellite navigation system.

=== Protection ===
Al-Khalid has modular composite armour and explosive reactive armour, high hardened steel plates over rolled homogeneous layers. The composite armour includes classified elements and NERA inserts. The vehicle also has overpressure nuclear-biological-chemical defense system, an effective thermal smoke generator, internal fire extinguisher and explosion-suppression system. The infrared signature of the tank is reduced by infrared reflective paint. The Al-Khalid's armour is publicly stated to be around 660mm vs HEAT and 550mm vs APFSDS without ERA on the Turret and the Glacis is Estimated to be around 450-470mm without ERA. The Al-Khalid-1 later inducted into the Pakistan Army is improved further from the Al-Khalid 1 unveiled earlier and is equipped with newly developed indigenous explosive reactive armor AORAK Mk.2, which is not only lightweight, but also more resistant to APFSDS, HEAT and HE-FS rounds. ERA is developed by Global Industrial Defence Solutions (GIDS). Al-Khalid is also equipped with an active protection system known as VARTA. HIT is working on an indigenous APS system for future batches, especially for Al-Khalid 2.

An advanced laser detection system from ATCOP has been added. The LTS 1 consists of a mast-mounted sensor and operator's control box, which includes a display showing threats 360 degrees around the tank. It can detect laser rangefinders and laser target designators and responds automatically by triggering acoustic alarms, smoke generators and other countermeasure systems. LTS 1 can detect laser devices operating in the 0.8 to 1.06 μm waveband, has a 360° field of view in azimuth (resolution of 15°) and a field of view in elevation of -15° to +90°.

The Laser Threat Sensor LTS786P is an early warning device which gives audio and visual alarms of threat by sensing a laser beam aimed at it from any direction. The exact location of the threat (incoming beam) is indicated by nine LEDs, covering all directions above the horizon. It has the capability to differentiate between a Laser Range Finder, Laser Target Designator or a Laser Target Tracker Signal. Provision of sensor output signal, interfacing for appropriate countermeasures, is also available. It can be used on stationary or moving objects of any size or shape. The maximum operating range is 10 km.

==== ATCOP LTS786P specifications ====
- Response: enhanced for Nd:YAG laser signal
- Range: >10,000 m
- Field of view: capable of detecting any signal aimed towards LTS786P.
- Detector type: silicon photodiode
- Size (approx.): 214 x 134 mm (sensor head)
- 126 x 123 x 100 mm (display unit)
- Weight 2 kg (sensor head), approx.): 1 kg (display unit)

== Variants ==
=== Prototypes ===
- Type 90-II – A further development of the Type 80/85 series main battle tanks introduced in 1992.
- P1 – Prototype incorporating a Chinese 125 mm gun, autoloader and fire-control system, German MTU-396 diesel engine and Renk LSG-3000 automatic transmission.
- P2 – Prototype incorporating a Chinese 125 mm gun and autoloader, Western fire-control system, Perkins 1200 hp Condor diesel engine and French SESM ESM500 automatic transmission.
- P3 – Prototype fitted with Chinese 125 mm gun and autoloader, Western fire-control system, Ukrainian KMDB 6TD-2 1200 hp diesel engine and French SESM ESM500 automatic transmission.
- P4 – Prototype export variant incorporating German NATO standard 120 mm gun, Western fire-control system, German MTU-871/TCM AVDS-1790 diesel engine and Renk LSG-3000 automatic transmission.

=== Production variants ===
==== Pakistani variants ====
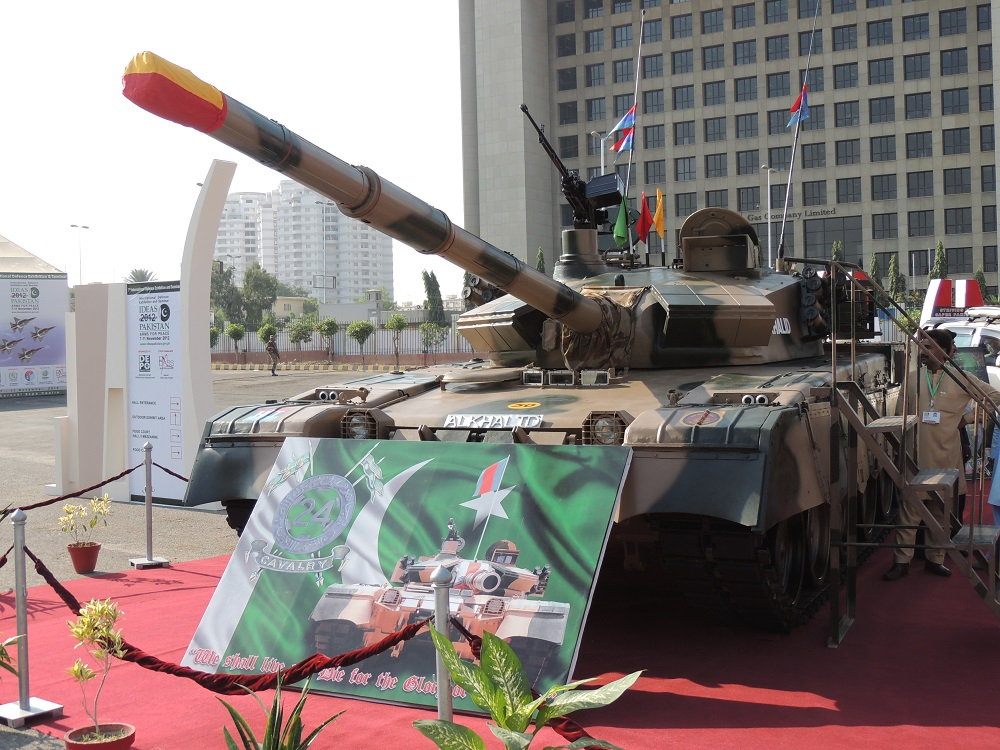
Al-Khalid tank on display at IDEAS 2012 held at Expo Center, Karachi, Pakistan in November, 2012.

- Al-Khalid – Based on P3 prototype of MBT-2000, operational as of 2001. Has an ammunition capacity of 39 125 mm rounds (22 in autoloader), 500 12.7 mm rounds and 3,000 7.62 mm rounds.
- Al-Khalid I – Upgraded variant with ammunition capacity increased to 49 125 mm rounds, 1,500 12.7 mm rounds and 7,100 7.62 mm rounds. Incorporates modifications made to the fire-control system which is now a more advanced multi process fire control computer with up to 7 km effective identification range. The engagement range is also improved which is up to 3.5 km, digital driver panel, IBMS, side-skirts, track pads, digitally controlled FPGA based solid state auto-loader with bidirectional tray movement and ammo availability info on screen, info on empty and full trays and types of available rounds, bigger carousel for longer rounds, (rate of fire increased to 9 rounds per minute), Ukrainian Varta electro-optical jammer (disrupts laser rangefinders, laser designators and anti-tank guided missile tracking systems), Sagem third-generation thermal imagers for both gunner and Commander and improved air conditioning system. It is the most heavily weaponized tank by tonnage. It is fitted with a 1,200 hp Ukrainian engine. Al-Khalid I's top speed is 72 km/h, and it weighs 46 tonnes.

==== Chinese variants ====
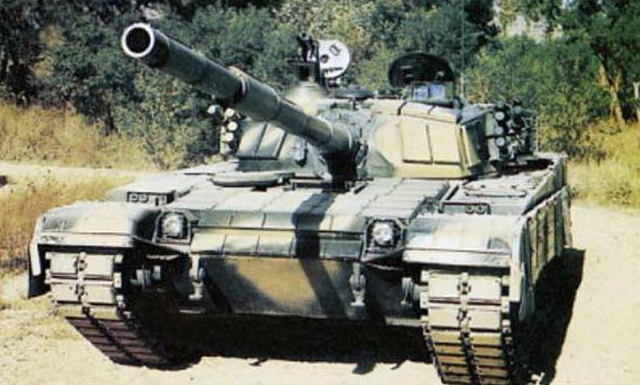
Chinese 90-IIM

- Type 90-IIM/MBT-2000 – Type 90-IIM was introduced in 2000 with Ukraine's KMDB 1,200 hp 6TD-2 diesel engine. Export version MBT-2000 introduced in 2001 at a defence exhibition in Abu Dhabi.
- VT-1A – A new export variant of the Type 90-IIM, with Chinese interior, turret, gun, electronics and armour. It has a Chinese 1300 horsepower engine.

=== Cancelled projects ===
- Type 90-IIA – An export model offered to Pakistan. It was powered by French V-series diesel engine, developing 1 500 hp. Cancelled after France joined the international arms embargo on Pakistan after the Pakistan's 1998 nuclear tests.

Further production was reputedly on hold due to lack of tank engines, with Ukraine first refusing to provide engines, but later promising to deliver 110 new tank engines. Since the 2014 Russian invasion, Ukraine was facing issues in making deliveries of equipment.

== Operators ==
=== Current operators ===
- Bangladesh – 44 MBT-2000s in service.
- Morocco – 54 in service.
- Myanmar – 180+ VT-1As in service. Received between 2009 and 2013
- Pakistan – 300 Al-Khalid and 110+ Al-Khalid I in service as of 2024.

=== Failed contracts ===
- Malaysia – In April 2002, it was reported that Malaysia was considering purchasing the Al-Khalid after evaluation by Malaysian military personnel, but Malaysia eventually backed out without stating any reasons.
- Peru – The Peruvian government had expressed interest in purchasing 80–120 units to complement the fleet of Soviet T-55 tanks in service with the Peruvian Army. However the deal fell through partly due to the unauthorised export of the Ukrainian engine.
- Saudi Arabia – The Saudi Arabian Army began conducting trials of the Al-Khalid's desert performance in April 2006, after expressing interest in purchasing a batch of the tanks 2 years earlier. No order for the tank was placed later.
- Sri Lanka – In May 2008, Lt. Gen Sarath Fonseka of the Sri Lanka Army held talks with his Pakistan Army counterparts regarding the sale of military equipment, weapons and ammunition. The supply of 22 Al-Khalid MBTs to the Sri Lanka Army was reportedly finalised during these talks in a deal worth over US$100 million. The order was later cancelled by Sri Lanka's Defence Secretary.
