= List of modern armoured fighting vehicles =

This article lists modern armoured fighting vehicles (AFVs) produced or used after World War II.

== Albania ==
AFVs produced in albania

=== MRAP (Mine-Resistant Ambush Protected) ===
- SHOTA

=== LTV ===
- TIMAK Tactical Vechicle (4+1)
- Ujku

== Algeria ==
AFVs produced in Algeria

- BCL-M5

== Argentina ==
AFVs produced in Argentina

- TAM
- VCTP
- VCA Palmaria
- Patagón

== Australia ==
AFVs produced in Australia

=== Wheeled armoured fighting vehicles ===
- ASLAV (Australian LAV-25 series)
- Boxer AFV

=== Armoured personnel carriers ===
- M113 Armored Personnel Carrier (modifications only)
- Bushmaster IMV
- Shorland S600 (Design by Short Brothers plc purchased in 1996 by BAE Systems Australia, with later variants produced by Tenix Defence)

== Austria ==
AFVs produced in Austria

- Saurer 4K 4FA series (Schützenpanzer A1)
- Steyr 4K 7FA
- SPz Ulan – co-development with Spain ("ASCOD").
- Pandur I 6x6
- Pandur II 6x6 and 8x8
- SK-105 Kürassier

== Azerbaijan ==
AFVs produced in Azerbaijan

- Matador 4x4 (Mine Resistant Ambush Protected vehicle)
- Marauder 4x4 (Mine Resistant Ambush Protected vehicle)

== Belgium ==
AFVs produced in Belgium

- BDX (APC)
- Cobra series
- SIBMAS
- FN 4RM-62F AB

== Belarus ==
AFVs produced in Belarus

- 2T Stalker

== Brazil ==
AFVs produced in Brazil

=== Armoured personnel carrier ===
- EE-3 Jararaca
- EE-9 Cascavel
- EE-11 Urutu
- VBTP-MR Guarani

=== Infantry fighting vehicles ===
- VBTP-Charrua
- EE-T4 Ogum
- FNM Cutia

=== Main battle tank ===
- EE-T1 Osório
- Bernardini MB-3 Tamoyo
- X1A2

=== Self-propelled artillery ===
- Astros II MLRS multiple rocket launcher

=== 4×4 armored car ===
- VBPED 4×4 CTEx light armoured car
- Marruá M27 VPBL Agrale/OTT 4×4 light armored car
- GUARÁ Avibrás 4×4 light armored car
- VBL Gladiador 4×4 light armored car
- AV-VU4 AM medium 4×4 armored car
- AV-VBL heavy 4×4 armored car

=== Others ===
- EE-17 Sucuri
- EE-18 Sucuri II

== Bulgaria ==
AFVs produced in Bulgaria

- BMP-23
- Tundzha self-propelled mortar (tracked, 120 mm)
- Podnos self-propelled mortar (tracked, 82 mm)
- MT-LB versions
- BTR-60PB-MD1

== Canada ==
AFVs produced in Canada

- LAV family of wheeled armoured vehicles:
  - AVGP: Cougar, Grizzly and Husky 6×6 armoured vehicles - based on the MOWAG Piranha
  - LAV-25 8×8 – Family of vehicles produced for the United States Marine Corps
  - Bison APC 8×8
  - Coyote Reconnaissance Vehicle 8×8
  - ASLAV 8×8 – Family of vehicles produced for the Australian Army based on the LAV-25 and Bison vehicles
  - LAV III 8×8
  - Stryker 8×8 – Co-produced in the United States for the United States Army
- Air Defense Anti-Tank System (ADATS)
- Multi-Mission Effects Vehicle (MMEV) (Project canceled)

== Chile ==
AFVs produced in Chile

- Piraña 6×6
- Piraña 8×8
- VTP-1 Orca
- VTP-2 Escarabajo

== China ==
Modern armoured fighting vehicles produced in the People's Republic of China.

=== Tanks ===
- Type 99 tank
- Type 96 tank
- Type 15 tank
- VT-4

=== Infantry fighting vehicles ===
- Type 92 aka WZ551 wheeled IFV (modern)
- ZBD-03 aka WZ-506, tracked dedicated airborne IFV (modern)
- ZBD-04 tracked semi-amphibious IFV (modern)
- ZBD-05, tracked dedicated amphibious IFV (modern)
- ZBL-08, family of wheeled vehicles including IFV, APC (modern)

== Colombia ==
AFVs produced in Colombia

- BTR-80 Caribe
- Hunter TR-12

== Croatia ==
AFVs produced in Croatia

- M-84
- M-95 Degman
- LOV
- LOV-1

== Denmark ==
AFVs produced in Denmark

=== Main battle tanks ===
- Leopard 1A5DK
- Leopard 1A5DK-1
- Leopard 2A7DK

=== Light Tanks ===
- M41 DK1

=== Tracked armoured personnel carriers and infantry fighting vehicles ===
- CV9035DK
- M113A2 Mk I DK
- M113 G3 DK
- M113 G4 DK
- As well as several other M113 variants

=== Wheeled armoured personnel carriers and infantry fighting vehicles ===
- Eagle I
- Mowag Eagle IV
- Mowag Piranha III
- Piranha V
- Cardom 10 (120mm mortar mounted on Piranha V)

== Egypt ==
=== Tanks ===
- Ramses-II main battle tank
- T-62 variants RO-115, RO-120 and T-62E
- M60 Patton (locally upgraded)
- M1A1 Abrams (locally produced)

=== Infantry fighting vehicles ===
- Egyptian infantry fighting vehicle

=== Armoured reconnaissance vehicles ===
- Tiger Kader-120 4×4 armored reconnaissance scout (locally built under license Italian VM 90)

=== Armoured personnel carriers ===
- Fahd
- Walid

=== Tank destroyers ===
- Locally modified anti-armour Humvee variant

=== Self-propelled air defence ===
- BTR-152 locally equipped with quadruple DShK

== Finland ==
AFVs produced in Finland

=== Armoured personnel carriers ===
- Patria 6×6 (XA-300)
- Patria Pasi (XA-186, -188, -202, -203)
- Protolab Misu
- Sisu GTP
- Sisu Pasi (XA-180, -185)

=== Multirole AFVs ===
- Patria AMV (XA-360, -361)

== France ==
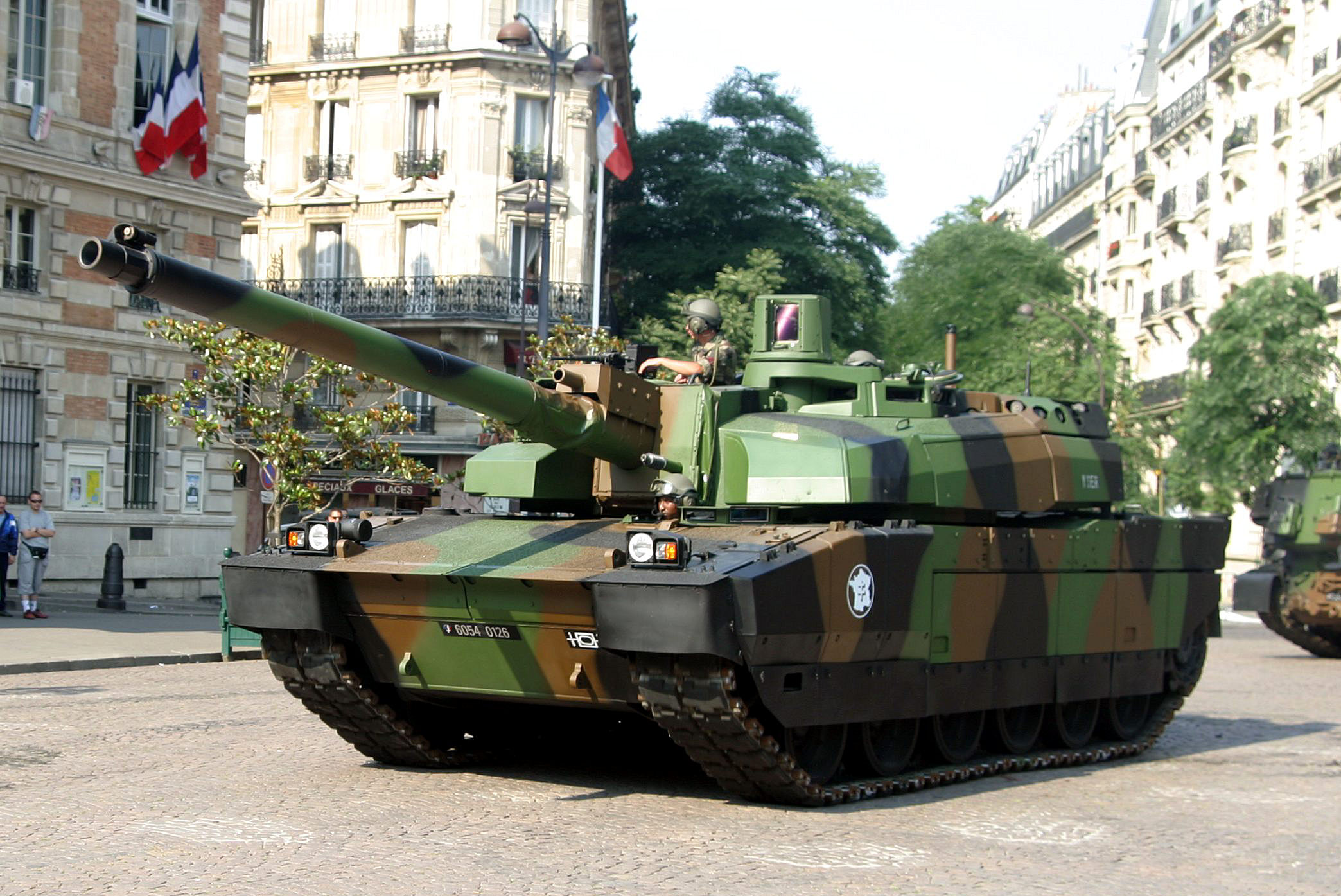
Leclerc main battle tank

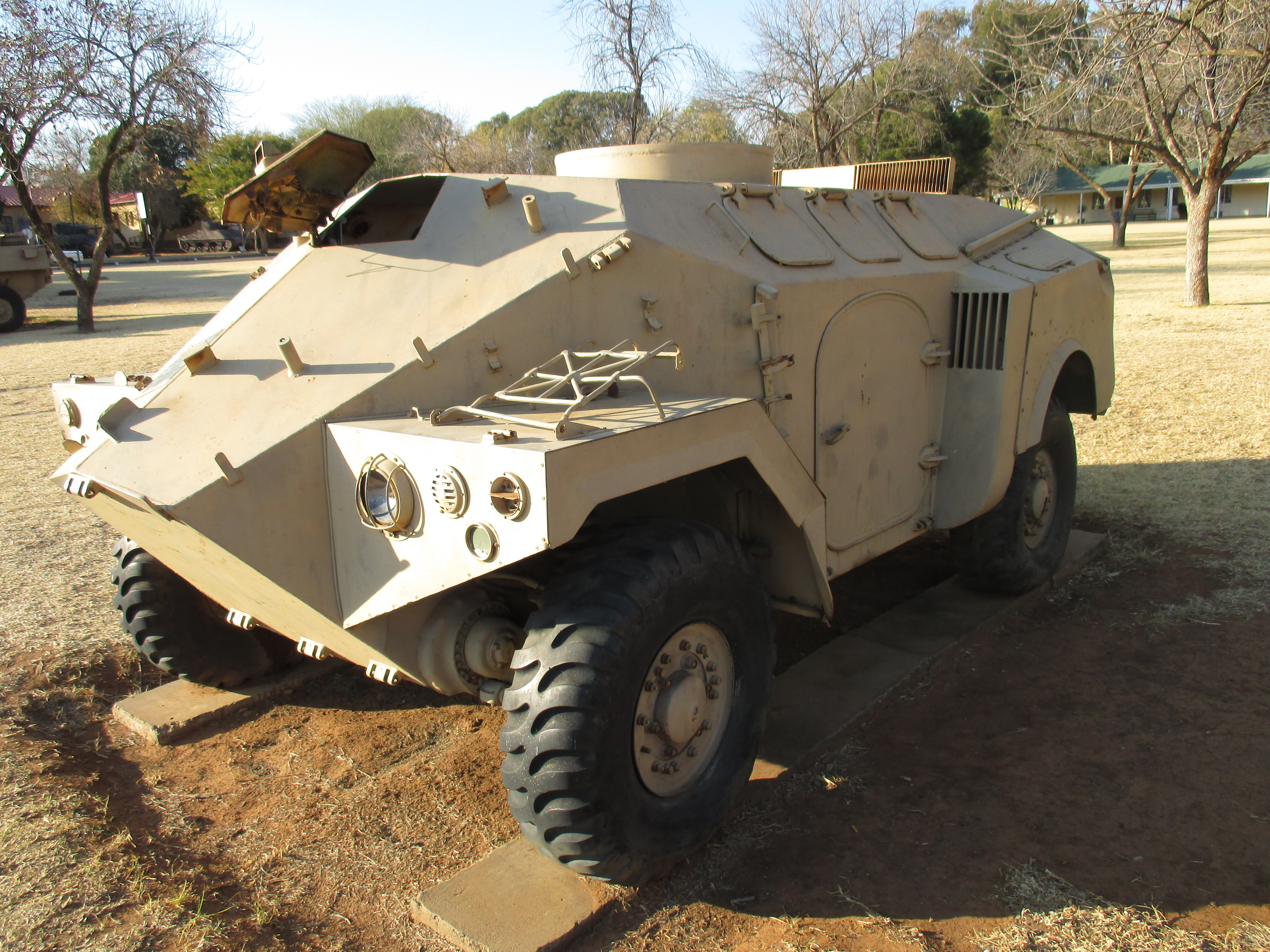
Panhard M3 VTT

AFVs produced in France

=== Tanks ===
- AMX 13
- AMX 30
- ARL 44
- Leclerc
- Leclerc XLR

=== Infantry fighting vehicles ===
- VBCI

=== Armoured reconnaissance vehicles ===
- AMX 10 RC
- Panhard AML
- Panhard EBR
- Panhard ERC
- VBC-90
- VBL
- EBRC Jaguar

=== Armoured personnel carriers ===
- AMX-10P
- VBMR Griffon
- Nexter Aravis
- Panhard M3
- Panhard VCR
- VAB
- VXB

=== Self-propelled artillery ===
- CAESAR self-propelled howitzer
- GCT 155mm

=== Multirole AFVs ===
- Vextra 105

=== Other AFVs ===
- Petit Véhicule Protégé

== Georgia ==
=== Fast attack vehicles ===
- DELGA-1 series

=== Armoured personnel carriers ===
- Didgori-1
- Didgori-2
- Didgori-3
- TAAV

=== Infantry fighting vehicle ===
- Lazika

=== Self-propelled artillery ===
- ZCRS-122

== Germany ==
AFVs produced in Germany

=== Tanks ===
- Leopard 1
- Leopard 2 (2A0)
- Leopard 2A1
- Leopard 2A2
- Leopard 2A3
- Leopard 2A4
- VT tank
- TH200 – Design similar to the Mowag Piranha

=== Self-propelled artillery ===
- PzH 2000
- LARS 1 & 2
- MARS

==== Self-propelled anti-aircraft artillery ====
- Flugabwehrkanonenpanzer Gepard
- Roland (missile)

=== Tank destroyers ===
- Kanonenjagdpanzer
- Raketenjagdpanzer 1
- Raketenjagdpanzer 2
- RakJPz 3 Jaguar 1 (HOT)
- RakJPz 4 Jaguar 2 (TOW)

=== Infantry fighting vehicles ===
- Marder 1
- Puma
- Lynx

=== Reconnaissance vehicle ===
- Luchs
- Fennek (replacing the Luchs)
- TH200 (prototype only)

=== Armoured personnel carriers ===
- TPz Fuchs 1
- GTK Boxer (MRAV)
- Thyssen Henschel UR-416

=== Bridge layers ===
- Biber
- Panzerschnellbrücke 2

=== Other AFVs ===
- Wiesel 1 & 2
- Dachs
- Kodiak
- Büffel
- Keiler
- ATF Dingo
- AGF Serval
- Mungo ESK
- Duro 3
- Grizzly
- YAK

== Greece ==
AFVs produced in Greece

Infantry Fighting Vehicles

ELVO Kentabrus

=== Tanks ===
- Leopard 2A6 HEL

=== Infantry carriers ===
- ELBO Leonidas-1
- ELBO Leonidas-2

=== Wheeled armoured vehicles ===
- Namco Tiger armored vehicle (proposed)
- EODH Hoplite

== Hungary ==
AFVs produced in Hungary

=== Armoured fighting vehicles ===
- Lynx infantry fighting vehicle

=== Wheeled armoured vehicles ===
- Gidrán 4x4 MRAP

== India ==
AFVs produced in India

=== Tanks ===
- Arjun MBT
- Arjun Mk 1A
- T-90S Bhishma MBT (2011)
- T-72M1 Combat Improved Ajeya MBT
- T-55A MBT (reserve)
- Vijayanta MBT (retired)
- Tank-EX Prototype MBT
- BMP-2 105 mm light tank prototype

=== Armoured fighting vehicles ===
- BMP-2 Sarath infantry fighting vehicle
- NAMICA tank destroyer
- Abhay IFV
- Vikram VT21 tracked variant

=== Armoured carrier ===
- TATA Kestrel
- Mahindra armored light specialist vehicle
- Kalyani M4
- Tarmour Heavy APC
- Aditya mine-protected personnel carrier
- Takshak light armoured vehicle
- Vikram VT21 wheeled variant

=== Self-propelled artillery ===
- Bhim SPA
- M-46 Catapult
- K9 VAJRA-T (Enhanced version of HTW's K9 Thunder made for Indian Army which outperformed its Russian counterpart: the Russian self-propelled 2S19 Msta-S howitzer)

== Indonesia ==
Armoured fighting vehicles produced in Indonesia

=== Armored Vehicles ===
- Pindad A.yani (APC)
- Pindad U.yani (APC)
- Pindad APR-1V (APC)
- Pindad APS-1 (APC)
- Pindad APS-2 (APC)
- Pindad APS-3 Anoa (APC)
- Pindad Komodo (Armored Car)
- Pindad Sanca (MRAP)
- Pindad Elang (Light Tactical Vehicle)
- P2 (armoured vehicle) (Armored Car)
- Harimau APC (APC)
- DMV-30 (Light Armored Vehicle)
- TAD Turangga (APC, Infantry Mobility Vehicle)
- SSE P1 PAKCI
- Anoa 2 6x6 Amphibious (Amphibious APC)

=== Infantry Fighting Vehicle ===
- Pindad Cobra
- Anoa Panser IFV 6×6 Canon 20 mm

=== Military Utility Vehicle ===
- Pindad Maung
- Pindad MV2
- Indonesian Light Strike Vehicle
- P6 ATAV
- ILSV-RTV (ATV Rubber Wheeled Vehicle)

=== Fire Support Vehicles ===
- Pindad Badak (Wheeled FSV)

=== Tank ===
- Harimau Modern Medium Weight Tank
- Pindad SBS Light Tank
- P8 Light Tank
- AMX-13/105 Retrofit

=== Self-propelled Artillery ===
- Pindad SBS 6x6 MLRS
- R-Han 122 MLRS

=== Miscellaneous Military Vehicles ===
- Badak 6x6 SPAAG
- Anoa 2 6x6 Mortar Carrier
- Anoa 2 6x6 Armored Recovery Vehicle
- Anoa 2 6x6 Ammunition Carrier
- Anoa 2 6x6 Command
- Anoa 2 6x6 Ambulance
- Ganilla 2.0 (Military Kitchen Truck)

== Iran ==
AFVs produced in Iran

=== Tanks ===
- Karrar MBT
- Zulfiqar 1 MBT
- Zulfiqar 2 MBT (prototype)
- Zulfiqar 3 MBT
- Type 72Z medium tank
- Tiam medium tank
- T-72M Rakhsh T-72M variant developed by the IRGC with new ERA, sights, an RWS. and many other upgrades.
- T-72S MBT (under license)
- Tosan light tank

=== Tank destroyers ===
- Aqareb wheeled 8x8 tank destroyer
- Pirooz on ARAS 4x4

=== Infantry fighting vehicles ===
- Makran IFV
- Cobra BMT-2 Boragh with either a 30mm Shipunov 2A42 auto-cannon or a ZU-23-2
- BMP-1 APC (under license)
- BMP-2 APC (under license)

=== Armoured personnel carriers ===
- Sayyad AFV
- Boragh APC
- Rakhsh 4x4 APC
- Sarir 4x4 APC
- Hoveyzeh tracked light vehicle
- BPR-82 Sedad 23mm BTR-60PB with an unmanned ZU-23-2
- Heidar-6 BTR-60PB with a 2A28 Grom and a new engine
- Heidar-7 BTR-60PB with unmanned 23 mm turret, ERA, and a new engine

=== Infantry mobility vehicles ===
- Toofan 4x4 IMV
- Ra'ad 6x6 IMV
- Roueintan 4x4 IMV
- Fateq 4x4 IMV

=== Self-propelled artillery ===
- Raad-1 self-propelled artillery
- Raad-2 self-propelled artillery
- Heidar-41 122 mm truck-based self-propelled artillery
- HM-41 truck-based automatic loading version

== Iraq ==
=== Tanks ===
- Lion of Babylon tank

== Republic of Ireland ==
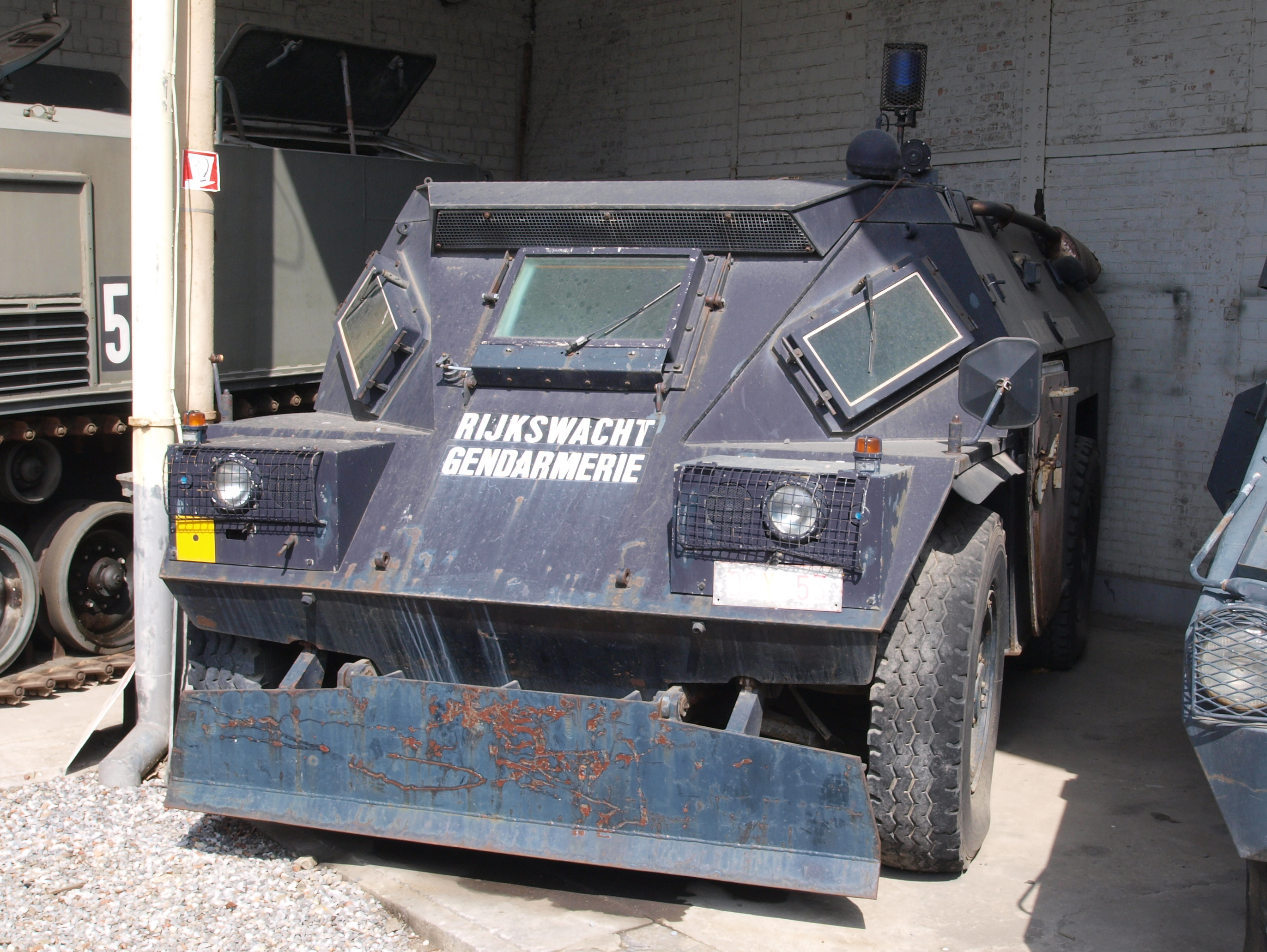
Timoney-derived BDX used by the Belgian Gendarmerie.

=== Armoured personnel carriers ===
- Timoney armoured personnel carrier

== Israel ==
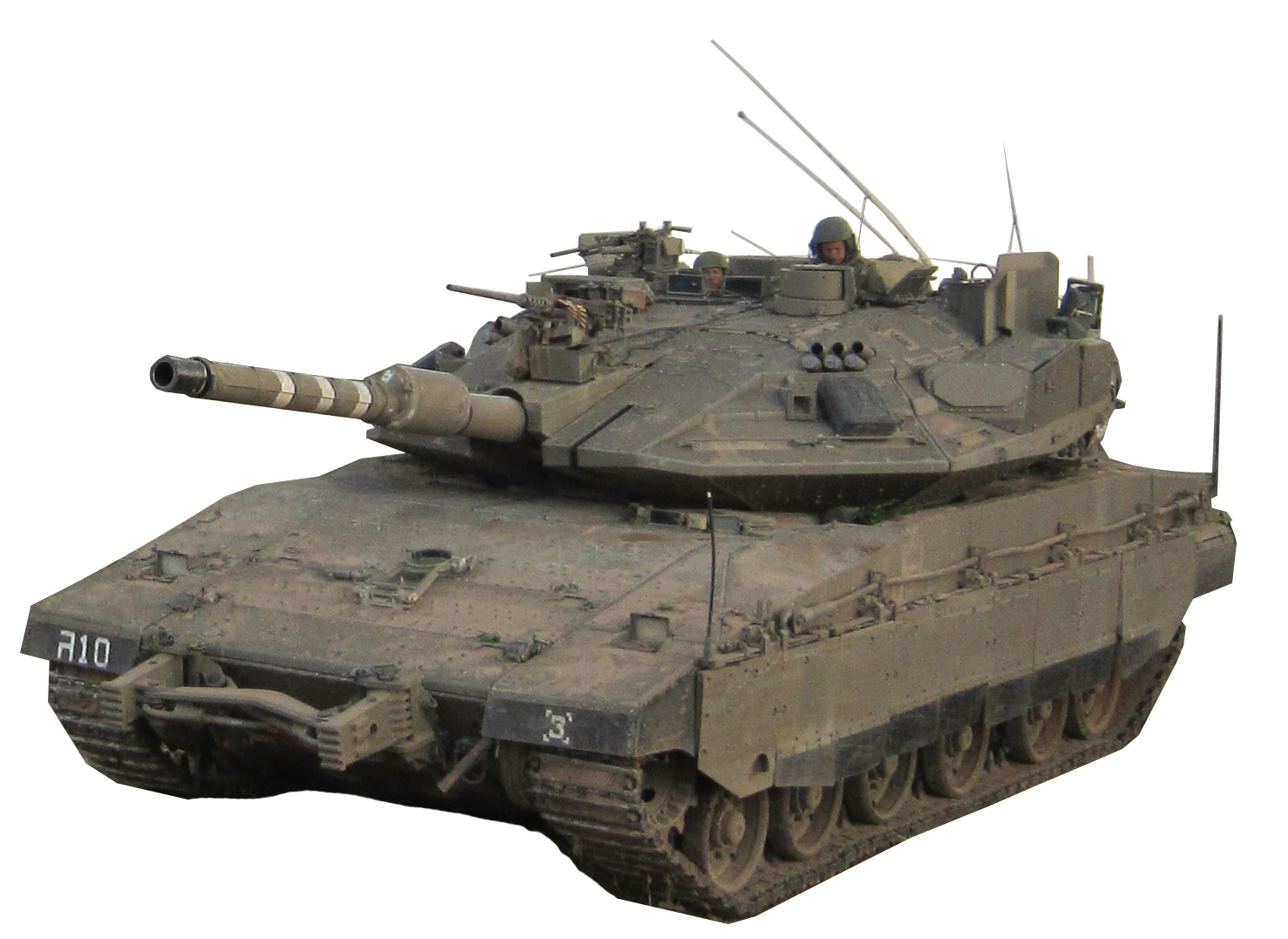
Merkava Mk 4M Windbreaker

=== Tanks ===
- Isherman (upgraded M4 Sherman tank)
- Sho't (upgraded Centurion tank)
- Magach (upgraded M60 and M48 Patton))
  - Magach 3: Modernized M48A1/A2C/A3
  - Magach 5: M48A5 in the original configuration. Generally similar to the Magach 3, but had slightly different engine and transmission—AVDS-1790-2D and CD-850-6A accordingly. They were eventually fitted with Blazer ER.
  - Magach 6: Modernized M60A1 or M60A3
  - Magach 7: M60 with more upgrades
- Sabra (upgraded M60 Patton tank)
- Merkava tank
  - Merkava Mk 1
  - Merkava Mk 2
  - Merkava Mk 3 (Ramaqh and Baz)
  - Merkava Mk 4 and Mk 4M Windbreaker

=== Armoured personnel carriers ===
- IDF Nagmachon APC (based on Centurion chassis)
- IDF Nakpadon APC (based on Centurion chassis)
- IDF Achzarit APC (based on T-54/55 chassis)
- IDF Namer IFV (based on Merkava chassis)
- Wolf armoured vehicle
- Golan armored vehicle
- Eitan AFV (to replace the M113 apcs )

=== Self-propelled artillery ===
- L-33/39 Ro'em self-propelled howitzer (based on M4 Sherman chassis)
- Makmat self-propelled mortar (based on M4 Sherman chassis)
- MAR-290 rocket artillery launcher (based on M4 Sherman chassis)
- Sholef self-propelled howitzer (based on Merkava chassis)
- Rascal self-propelled howitzer

=== Combat engineering vehicles ===
- IDF Caterpillar D9 armored bulldozer
- IDF Puma CEV (based on Centurion chassis)
- IDF Nammer CEV (based on Merkava chassis)
- Nemmera ARV (based on Merkava chassis)

== Italy ==
AFVs produced in Italy

=== Main battle tanks ===
- OF-40
- Ariete

=== Infantry fighting vehicles ===
- Dardo (infantry fighting vehicle)
- VBM Freccia – infantry fighting variant of the Centauro

=== Armoured personnel carriers ===
- LVTP7/AAVP7A1 amphibious armored vehicle (35 bought from the US, locally upgraded)
- Fiat CM6614
- Several locally produced M113 variants
- MAV 5 armoured personnel carrier
- VBL Puma
- VTML Lince
- VTMM Orso 4x4

=== Tank destroyers ===
- B1 Centauro wheeled tank destroyer

=== Self-propelled air defence ===
- SIDAM 25

== Japan ==
AFVs produced in Japan

=== Main battle tanks ===
- Type 61
- Type 74
- Type 90
- Type 10

=== Infantry fighting vehicles ===
- Type 89

=== Armored reconnaissance vehicles ===
- Type 87

=== Armored personnel carriers ===
- Type 60
- Type 73
- Type 96
- Type 82 (command vehicle)

=== Self-propelled artillery ===
- Type 74
- Type 75
- Type 99
- Type 60 self-propelled mortar
- Type 96 120 mm mortar
- Type 75 rocket launcher
- Type 19 155 mm wheeled self-propelled howitzer

=== Self-propelled air defence ===
- Type 87 self-propelled anti-aircraft gun

=== Tank destroyers ===
- Type 60 self-propelled 106 mm recoilless gun
- Type 16 maneuver combat vehicle

== Malaysia ==
AFVs produced in Malaysia

=== Tracked armoured fighting vehicle ===
- ACV-300

=== Wheeled armoured fighting vehicle ===
- DefTech AV8

=== Wheeled armoured personnel carrier / Mine-resistant ambush protected (MRAP) ===
- DefTech AV4
- Mildef Tarantula HMAV 4x4

== Myanmar ==
Armoured vehicle producing in Myanmar.

=== Tanks ===
- MALT (Myanmar Army light tank):105 mm light tank based on 2S1U chassis.

=== Infantry fighting vehicles ===
- BAAC-73: (4x4) infantry fighting vehicle
- BAAC-83: (4x4) infantry fighting vehicle
- BAAC-84: (4x4) infantry fighting vehicle
- BAAC-85: (4x4) infantry fighting vehicle
- BAAC-86: (4x4) infantry fighting vehicle
- BAAC-87: (4x4) infantry fighting vehicle

=== Armoured personnel carriers ===
- ULARV-1: (4x4) armoured personnel carrier with a 14.5 mm machine gun
- ULARV-2: (4x4) armoured personnel carrier with a 14.5 mm machine gun and a short range Igla turret
- ULARV-3 (prototype): (6x6) armoured personnel carrier with a RCWS

=== Army scout vehicle ===
- MAV-1: (4 x 4) light armoured vehicle
- MAV-2: (4 x 4) light armoured vehicle
- MAV-3: (4 x 4) light armoured vehicle
- MAV-4: (4 x 4) light armoured vehicle
- Naung Yoe Jeep: (4 x 4) armoured Jeep
- Inlay Jeep:(4 x 4) armoured Jeep

=== Armoured air-defence vehicle ===
- MADV-1: (4 x 4) armoured air-defence vehicle based on locally made Naung Yoe Armoured Jeep.
- MADV-2: (4 x 4) armoured air-defence vehicle based on locally made MAV-1 Light Armoured Vehicle.

== Netherlands ==
AFVs produced in the Netherlands

=== Tanks ===
- Leopard 2A6

=== Armoured fighting vehicles ===
- Combat Vehicle 90
- YPR-765 series

=== Armoured personnel carriers ===
- DAF YP-408
- Sisu XA-188
- YPR-765 series
- Fennek
- Boxer MRAV
- Tpz Fuchs 1 Eloka
- Bushmaster IMV

== North Korea ==
AFVs produced in North Korea

=== Tanks ===
- Chonma-ho
- Pokpung-ho
- M2020
- PT-85

=== Infantry fighting vehicles and armoured personnel carriers ===
- M-2012
- M-2010
- 8×8 APC
- VTT-323
- Model 2009
- M1992

=== Self-propelled guns ===
- M-1978 Koksan
- M-1974 152mm SP
- M-1975 130mm SP
- M-1992 130mm SP
- M-1977 122mm SP
- M-1981 122mm SP
- M-1991 122mm SP
- M-1992 120mm SP

== Norway ==
AFVs produced in Norway

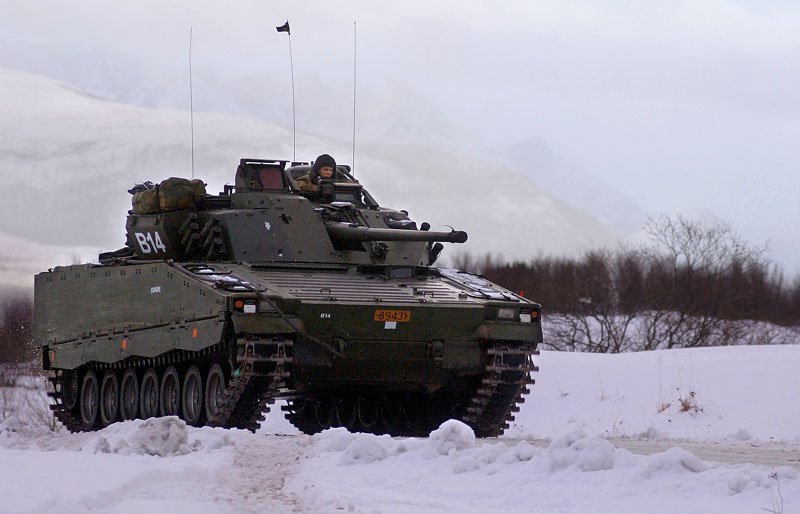
CV9030

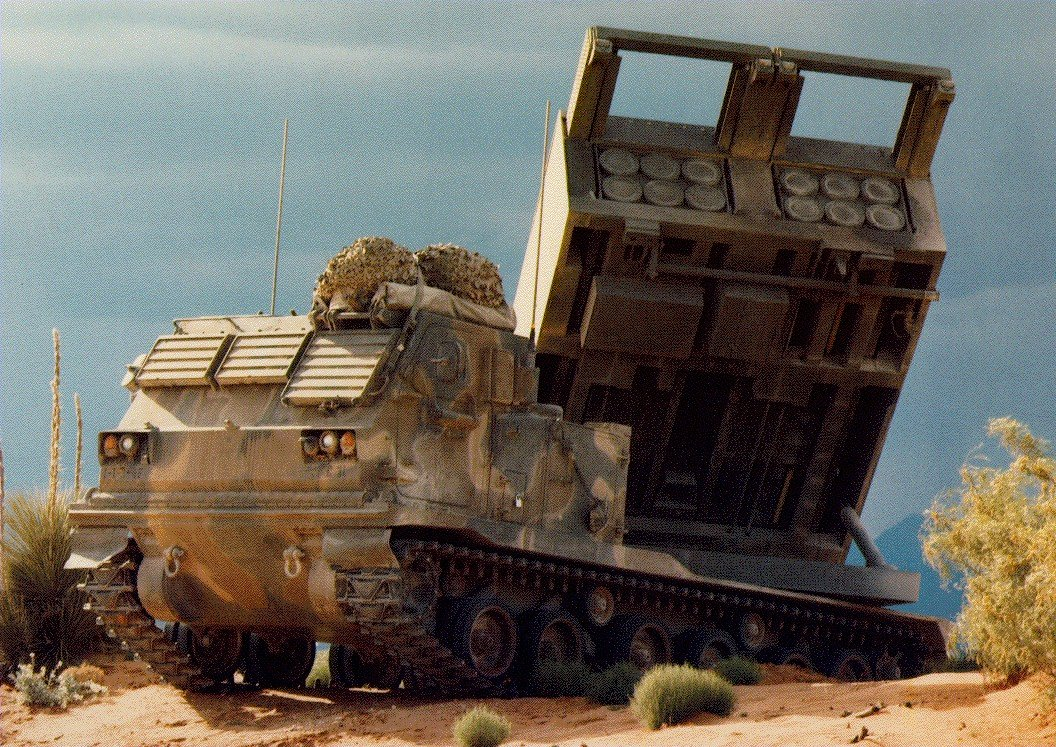
MLRS

=== Main battle tanks ===
- Leopard 1 A5NO
- Leopard 2 A4

=== Light tanks ===
- NM-116

=== Armoured personnel carrier ===
- NM135
- Several other M113 variants

=== Tank destroyers ===
- NM142

== Pakistan ==
=== Main battle tanks (MBT) ===
- Haidar MBT
- Al-Khalid/1/2
- Al-Zarrar
- Type 85IIAP - Pakistan specific T-85IIAP variants were license made at HIT and were later upgraded to T-85UG standards.
- Type 69IIMP - T-69IIMP variants were license made in Pakistan.

=== Armoured recovery vehicles (ACRV) ===
- Type 84 - W653 variant was license made at HIT

=== Multirole combat vehicles (MCV) ===
- Hamza 8x8
- Hamza 6x6

=== Armoured personnel carriers (APC) ===
- ASV Dragoon - License made at HIT
- Mohafiz - Internal security vehicle
- M113 - License made domestic variants
  - APC Talha – Armoured personnel carrier
  - Al-Hadeed - Armoured Recovery Vehicle
  - Al-Qaswa – Armoured logistics vehicle
  - Sakb – Armoured Command Vehicle

=== Self propelled guns (SPG) ===
- M109 - M-109A2 SPG License made at HIT

== Poland ==
AFVs produced in Poland

=== Tanks ===
- T-72M/M1 – standard Soviet designs, produced on license in Poland.
- T-72M1R – Polish T-72 modernization.
- T-72M2D "Wilk" – T-72 modernization that led to the creation of PT-91, prototype.
- PT-91/A/MA/MA1 "Twardy" – deep modernization of the T-72M/M1, with its various minor variants and modernization.
- PT-91Z "Hardy" – PT-91 modernization that led to the development of the export PT-91 variant for Malaysia - PT-91M "Pendekar", prototype.
- PT-91E/EX – PT-91 export variants.
- PT-91M "Pendekar" – export variant for Malaysia.
- PT-91P – export variant for Peru, technology demonstrator.
- PT-72U/91U/91EU – variants designed for urban warfare. Technology demonstrators.
- PT-16 – deep modernization of PT-91, prototype.
- PT-17 – another deep modernization of PT-91, this time in collaboration with Ukraine.
- PT-91M2 – further modernization of PT-91.
- Leopard 2PL – modern tank based on Leopard 2.
- pl-01 light stealth tank

=== Tracked armoured personnel carriers and infantry fighting vehicles ===
- IFV Borsuk – first production batch, in testing
- WPB Anders – prototype, cancelled
- BWP-2000 – prototype/experimental, cancelled
- BWP "Puma" E8 – modernized BMP
- BWP "Puma" RCWS-30 – modernized BMP
- BWP-1 series infantry fighting vehicle
- SPG Kalina series
- OT-62 TOPAS series
- Opal series
- MT-LB series

=== Wheeled armoured personnel carriers and infantry fighting vehicles ===
- KTO Rosomak – Licensed version of Patria Advanced Modular Vehicle
- KTO Ryś – 8x8 APC based on the SKOT APC
- KTO Irbis – 6x6 variant of KTO "Ryś"
- OT-64 SKOT

=== Armoured cars ===
- Dzik
- Jenot
- Skorpion-3
- Tur

=== Self-propelled artillery ===
- 2S1 "Goździk" – (pl. Carnation) 122 mm howitzer using MT-LB chassis, licensed copy of soviet design
- AHS Krab – 155 mm howitzer, a modern tracked system
- PZA "Loara" – AA system based on a PT-91 chassis, withdrawn from service
- Poprad
- M120 Rak - 120 mm mortar

== Portugal ==
AFVs produced in Portugal

=== Wheeled armoured fighting vehicles ===
- Commando MK III APC
- Chaimite
- Pandur 8X8 APC – manufactured in Barreiro, under licence

=== Main battle tanks ===
- Leopard 2A6 NL

== Romania ==
AFVs produced in Romania

=== Tanks ===
- TR-580
- TR-85
- TR-85 M1 Bizonul

=== Armoured personnel carriers ===
- TAB-71
- TAB-77
- Zimbru
- TABC-79
- Saur 1
- Saur 2
- MLVM
- Cobra II

=== Infantry fighting vehicles ===
- MLI-84
- MLI-84M Jderul

=== Self-propelled artillery ===
- Model 89
- ATROM

== Russia ==
AFVs produced in Russia

=== Tanks ===
- Black Eagle Tank (cancelled)
- T-72
- T-80
- T-90
- T-95 (cancelled)
- T-14 Armata

=== Armoured personnel carriers ===
- BTR-80
- BTR-90
- SBA-60K2 Bulat
- BPM-97
- Ural Typhoon
- Kamaz Typhoon
- Kurganets-25
- BTR-MDM
- BMO-T

=== Infantry fighting vehicles ===
- BMP-3
- BMD-4
- T-15 Armata
- Atom (infantry fighting vehicle)
- BMPT

=== Tank destroyers ===
- Kornet-D

=== Self-propelled artillery ===
- 2S3 Akatsiya
- 2S31 Vena
- 2S19 Msta
- 2S35 Koalitsiya-SV

=== Self-propelled air defense ===
- 9K35 Strela-10
- S-300 missile system
- Buk missile system
- Tor missile system

== Serbia ==
AFVs produced in Serbia

=== Tanks ===
- M-84AS

=== Armoured personnel carriers ===
- BOV M11
- BOV M16 Milos
- Lazar 2

=== Infantry fighting vehicles ===
- BVP M-80AB1
- Lazar 3

=== Combat engineering vehicles ===
- VIU-55 Munja

== Singapore ==
AFVs produced in Singapore

=== Tanks ===
- Leopard 2SG

=== Armoured fighting vehicles ===
- AMX-10P PAC90 and other versions
- M113 Modernised with 25 mm Bushmaster or 40 mm AGL
- Bionix AFV 28-ton replacement for M113 with 25 mm, 30 mm or 40 mm AGL
- Bronco ATTC (All Terrain Tracked Carrier)
- Bv206 ATTC with variants
- Terrex AV-81
- Hunter AFV

=== Self-propelled guns ===
- SSPH1 155 mm Computerised Automatic-loading SP gun

== Slovenia ==
AFVs produced in Slovenia

- LKOV Valuk
- LKOV Krpan

== South Africa ==
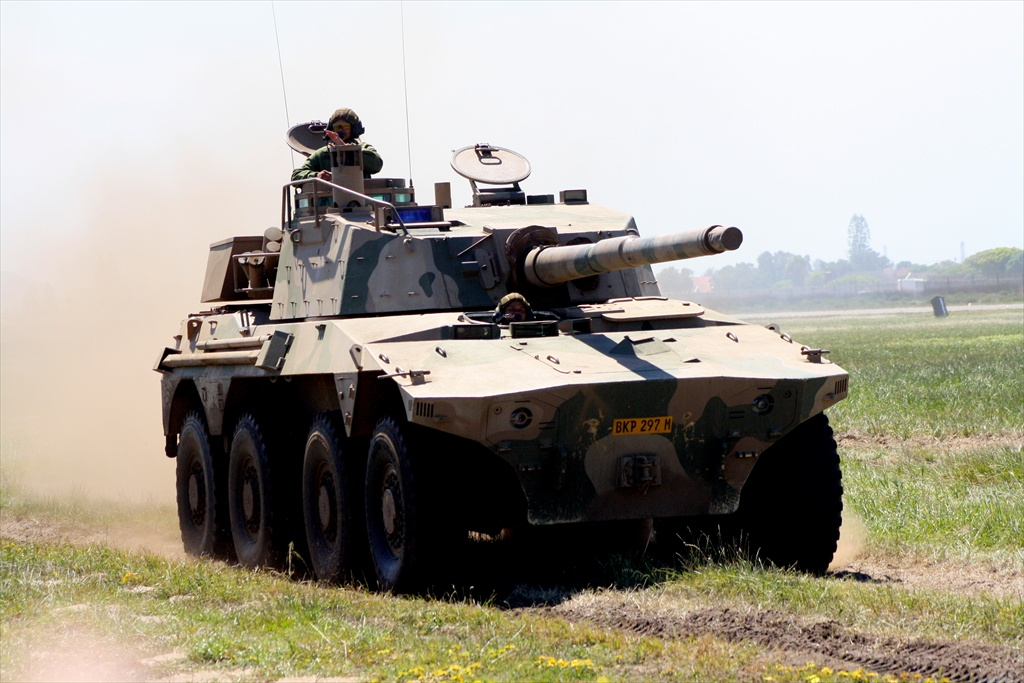
Rooikat armoured reconnaissance vehicle

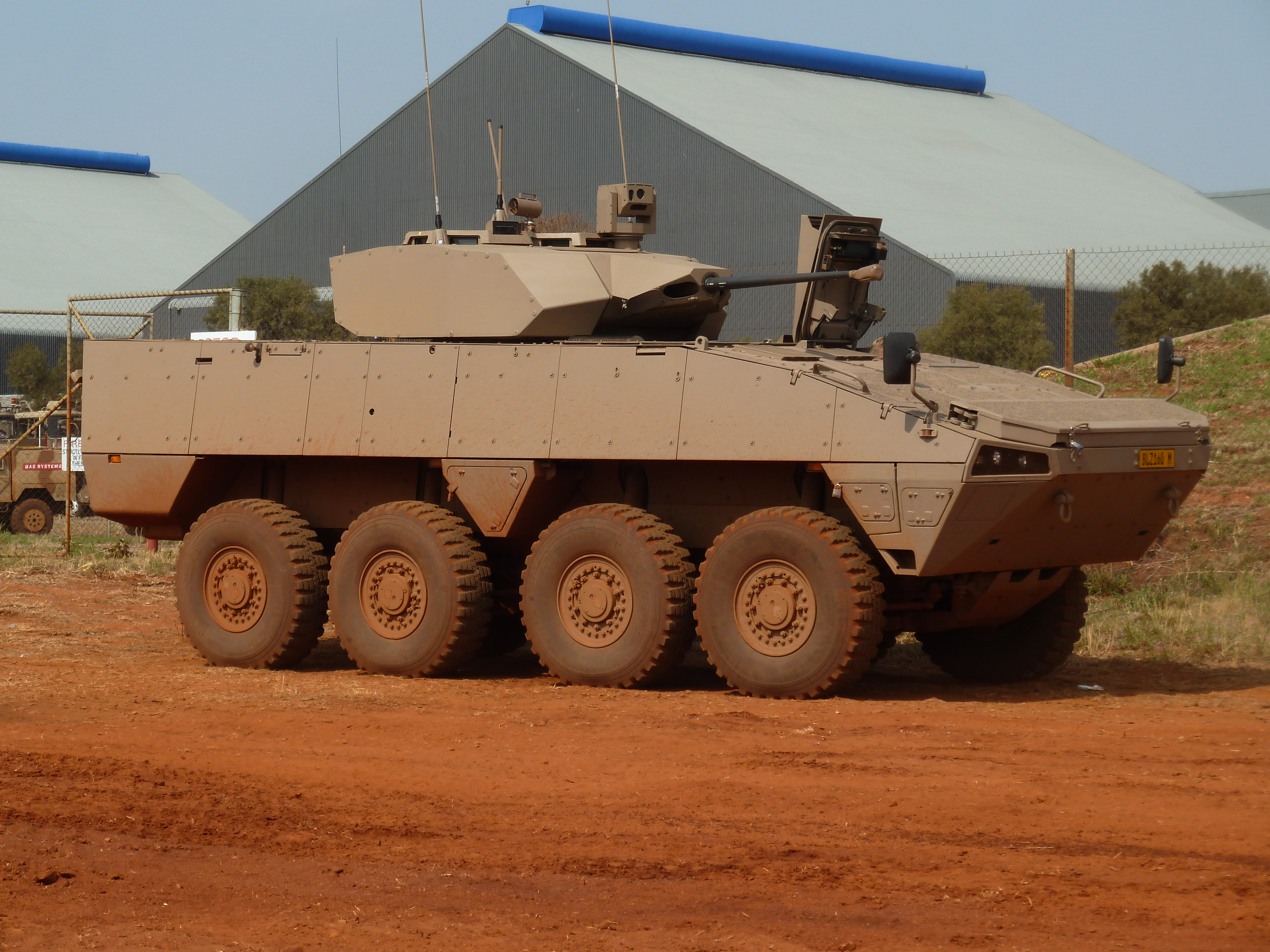
Badger infantry fighting vehicle

Armoured fighting vehicles designed and produced in South Africa

=== Tanks ===
==== Main battle tanks ====
- Olifant Mk1A
- Olifant Mk2

==== Prototype tanks ====
- Semel
- Skokiaan
- TTD

=== Self propelled artillery ===
- G6 howitzer
- T5-52

=== Infantry fighting vehicles ===
- Ratel
- Badger
- LM13
- Mbombe

=== Armoured personnel carriers ===
- Buffel
- Casspir
- Hippo
- LM8
- LM14
- Mamba
- Marauder
- Matador
- Maverick
- RCV-9
- Reva
- RG-12
- RG-19
- RG-31 Nyala
- RG-32 Scout
- RG-33
- RG-34
- RG-35
- RG-41
- RG Outrider
- PUMA M26-15

=== Armoured cars ===
- Eland
- Rooikat

== South Korea ==
AFVs produced in South Korea

=== Tanks ===
- M48A5K
- K1 & K1A1/A2
- K2 Black Panther

=== Armoured fighting vehicles ===
- KAAV7A1
- K277
- K1 ARV
- K1 AVLB
- K-200 KIFV
- K21 IFV
- K-532
- KM900
- Doosan Barracuda

=== Self-propelled artillery ===
- K-55 howitzer
- M110 203 mm SP howitzer
- K-9 Thunder 155 mm SP howitzer
- K-136 Kooryong MLRS
- K239 Chunmoo MLRS

=== Self-propelled air defense ===
- K30 Biho
- K263
- Crotale (missile) K-SAM

== Soviet Union (later Russian Federation) ==
AFVs produced in the [ Soviet Union / Russian Federation]

=== Tanks ===
- PT-76
- T-10
- T-54
- T-55
- T-62
- T-64
- T-72
- T-80
- T-90
- T-14 Armata

=== Armoured personnel carriers and infantry fighting vehicles ===
- BMP-1
- BMP-2
- BMP-3
- BMD-1
- BMD-2
- BMD-3
- BRM-1
- BRDM-1
- BRDM-2
- BRDM-3
- BTR-152
- BTR-40
- BTR-50
- BTR-60
- BTR-70
- BTR-80
- BTR-D
- BTR-90
- MT-LB

=== Self-propelled artillery ===
- 2P 406mm
- 2S1 122mm
- 2S3 Akatsiya 152mm
- 2S4 240mm
- 2S5 152mm
- 2S7 203mm
- 2S9 120mm
- 2S19 152mm
- 2S23 120mm
- ASU-85 85mm

=== Self-propelled air defense ===
- ZSU-57-2
- ZSU-23-4
- 2K22 Tunguska
- 9K31 Strela-1
- 9K35 Strela-10
- 9K33 Osa
- Tor missile system

== Spain ==
AFVs produced in Spain

=== Tanks ===
- Leopardo 2E
- M60
- AMX 30

=== Armoured fighting vehicles ===
- Centauro VRCC (Vehículo de Reconocimiento y Combate de Caballería)
- VEC-M1

=== Infantry fighting vehicles ===
- Pizarro IFV – codevelopment with Austria ("ASCOD")

=== Armoured personnel carriers ===
- BMR-M1
- LVTP7A1
  - Piranha IIIC

== Sri Lanka ==
AFVs produced in Sri Lanka

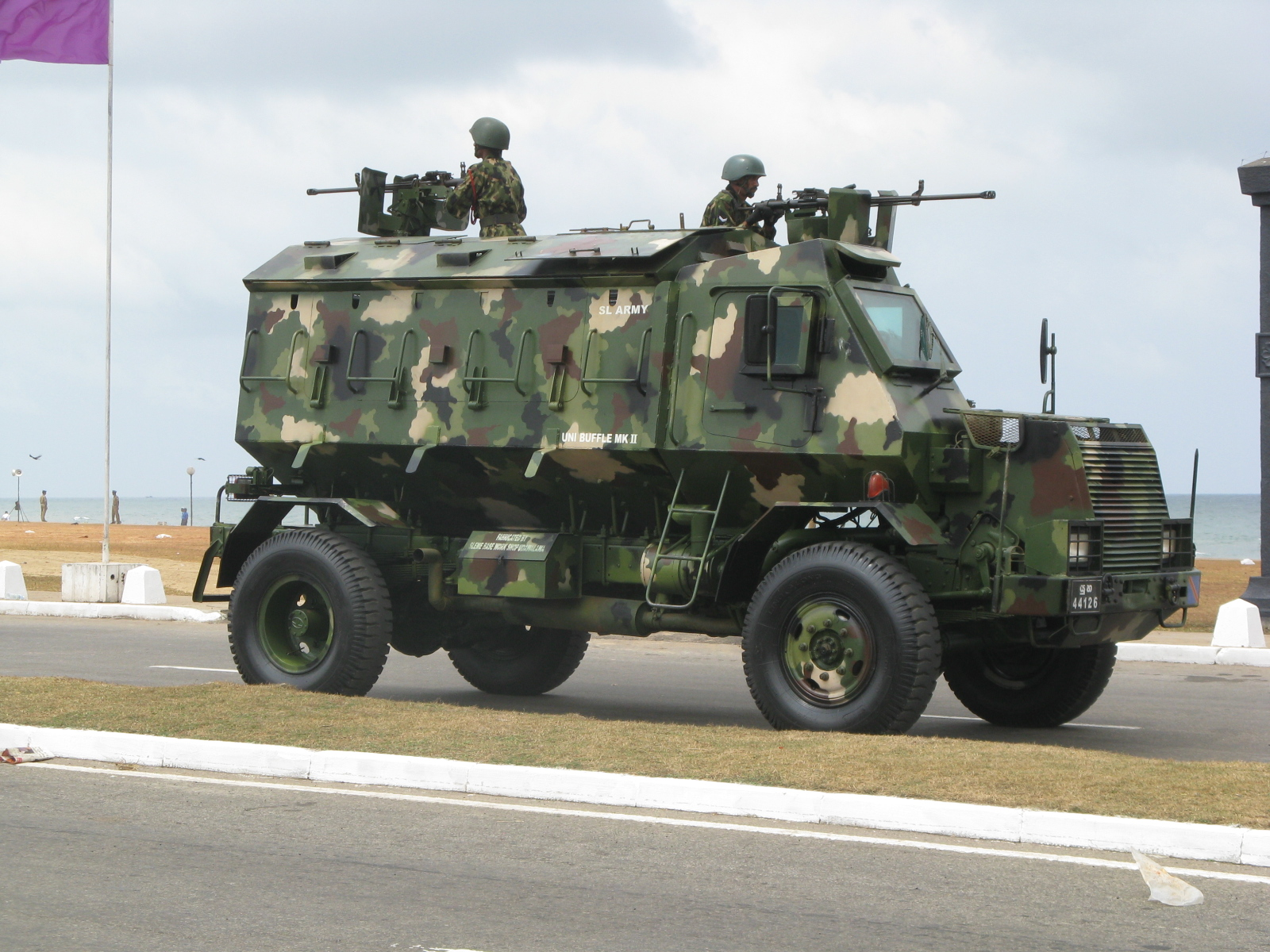
Unibuffel MK II Armored Personnel Carrier – Sri Lanka Army

=== Armoured personnel carriers ===
- Avalon (MPV)
- Unicorn
- Unibuffel

== Sweden ==
AFVs produced in Sweden

=== Tanks ===
- Stridsvagn 74 medium tank
- Stridsvagn 103 S tank
- Ikv 91 tank destroyer with 90 mm low-pressure gun
- Strv 121 Leopard 2A4
- Strv 122 Leopard 2 (Swedish version)

=== Infantry fighting vehicles ===
- Combat Vehicle 90

=== Self-propelled artillery ===
- Bandkanon 1
- Archer Artillery System

=== Armoured personnel carriers ===
- Pbv 301
- Pbv 302
- Bv 308/309
- BvS 10

=== Other AFVs ===
- Pvkv m/43
- Lvkv fm/43
- Ikv 72
- Ikv 102
- Ikv 103
- Pvrbbv 551
- Lvrbbv 701

== Switzerland ==
AFVs produced in Switzerland

=== Main battle tanks ===
- Pz-87 LEO
- Pz-68
- Pz-61

=== Armored fighting vehicles ===
- Spz2000 (CV9030)
- Piranha I 4×4, 6×6 and 8×8
- Piranha II 4×4, 6×6 and 8×8
- Piranha III 6×6, 8×8 and 10×10
- Piranha IV 8×8
- Piranha V 8×8
- SPz 63

=== Self-propelled artillery ===
- PzHb 88-95 "KAWEST"

=== Armored reconnaissance vehicles ===
- Eagle
- Panzerjäger – 6×6 Mowag Piranha with a TOW missile system

== Taiwan ==
AFVs produced in Taiwan

=== Main battle tanks ===
- CM11 Brave Tiger
- CM12 tank
- M1A2T (U.S export)

=== Armored fighting vehicles ===
- CM21 armored vehicle
- CM22
- CM23
- CM27
- CM32 Clouded Leopard – 8x8
- V-150S

== Thailand ==
AFVs produced in Thailand

=== Infantry fighting vehicles ===
- BTR-3E1
- DTI Black Widow Spider
- DTI 8×8 AAPC
- Panus R-600 8×8
- Chaiseri tiger 1

=== Other AFVs ===
- M113

=== Self-propelled artillery ===
- ATMOS 2000
- Soltam M-71
- M425

=== Self-propelled air defense ===
- M163 Vulcan

=== Wheeled armoured personnel carrier / Mine-resistant ambush protected (MRAP) ===
- First Win
- Phantom-380 x

== Turkey ==
AFVs produced in Turkey

=== Main battle tanks ===
- Altay
- Leopard 1T 'Volkan'
- Leopard 2NG local modernisation programme of Leopard 2A4
- Several locally upgraded M60 variants

=== Infantry fighting vehicles ===
- ACV-15
- Tulpar

=== Armored personnel carriers ===
- Akrep
- Arma
- Cobra
- Pars
- Kaya
- Kirpi
- Ural
- Yavuz
- ZAHA Marine Assault Vehicle

=== Self-Propelled Artillery ===
- T-155 Fırtına

=== Multirole AFVs ===
- Amazon
- Nurol Ejder

== Ukraine ==
AFVs produced in Ukraine

=== Main battle tanks ===
- T-55AGM
- T-64BM2
- T-64U (BM Bulat)
- T-72MP
- T-72AG
- T-72-120
- T-80UD
- T-84
- T-84-120 Yatagan
- BM Oplot

=== Infantry fighting vehicles ===
- BMP-1M/BMP-1U
- BMP1-LB

=== Armoured personnel carriers ===
- BTR-3
- BTR-4
- BTR-94
- Dozor-B

=== Other AFVs ===
- BREM-84

== United Kingdom ==
AFVs produced in the United Kingdom

=== Main battle tanks ===
- Centurion
- FV4101 Charioteer
- Conqueror heavy tank
- Chieftain
- Challenger 1
- Challenger 2
- Challenger 3
- Vickers MBT

=== Infantry fighting vehicles ===
- FV510 Warrior

=== Armoured reconnaissance vehicles ===
- Ferret Scout Car wheeled (4×4) armoured car
- FV721 Fox CVR wheeled (4×4) armoured car
- Jackal family of vehicles including Jackal 2 and Coyote 6x6
- Sabre tracked armoured reconnaissance vehicle
- Saladin wheeled (6×6) armoured car
- Scorpion tracked armoured reconnaissance vehicle
- Scimitar tracked armoured reconnaissance vehicle

=== Armoured personnel carriers ===
- Alvis Saracen
- Saxon
- FV103 Spartan
- FV105 Sultan
- FV432
- Humber Pig

=== Tank Destroyers ===
- FV102 Striker tracked anti-tank missile carrier
- FV438 Swingfire tracked anti-tank missile carrier
- Humber Hornet air-deployable wheeled anti-tank missile carrier

=== Self-propelled artillery ===
- Abbot FV433 self-propelled gun
- AS90 self-propelled howitzer

=== Self-propelled air defence ===
- Alvis Stormer HVM
- Tracked Rapier

=== Armoured Recovery Vehicles ===
- Centurion ARV Mk II
- Challenger Armoured Repair and Recovery Vehicle
- FV434 armoured repair vehicle
- Samson tracked armoured recovery vehicle

=== Combat engineering vehicles ===
- Terrier armoured digger
- Trojan armoured engineer vehicle

=== Other AFVs ===
- Ocelot protected patrol vehicle
- Shorland armoured car internal security vehicle
- Other Alvis Stormer variants

== United States ==
AFVs produced in the United States

=== Tanks ===
==== Main battle tanks ====
- M46 Patton
- M47 Patton
- M48 Patton
- M60 Patton
- M103 heavy tank
- M1 Abrams
- MGV

==== Light tanks ====
- M24 Chaffee Light Tank
- M41 Walker Bulldog Light Tank
- M551 Sheridan Light/Airmobile Tank
- M901 Improved TOW Vehicle
- Stingray light tank
- M8 AGS

=== Infantry fighting vehicles ===
- AIFV
- M2 Bradley infantry fighting vehicle
- BCT Ground Combat Vehicle (Cancelled Feb 2014. Intended to replace the M113 by 2018 and the Bradley)
- XM30 Mechanized Infantry Combat Vehicle

=== Armoured reconnaissance vehicles ===
- Cadillac Gage Commando
- LAV-25
- Lynx reconnaissance vehicle
- M3 Bradley Cavalry Fighting Vehicle

=== Armoured personnel carriers ===
==== Tracked ====
- LVTP7/AAVP7A1 amphibious armored carrier
- LVTP-5
- EFV
- Armored Multi-Purpose Vehicle
- M75 armored personnel carrier
- M59 armored personnel carrier
- M113 armored personnel carrier
- M114 armored fighting vehicle

==== Wheeled ====
- Buffalo
- Caiman
- Cougar
- Oshkosh L-ATV
- Oshkosh M-ATV
- Osprea Mamba
- International Maxxpro
- International MXT-MV
- M1117
- Cadillac Gage Ranger
- RG-33
- Stryker (co-produced in Canada)
- Textron Tactical Armoured Patrol Vehicle
- Amphibious Combat Vehicle

=== Self-propelled artillery ===
- M56 howitzer
- M50 Ontos self-propelled rifle
- M107 175 mm SP howitzer
- M108 105 mm SP howitzer
- M109 155 mm SP howitzer
- M110 203 mm SP howitzer
- M84 mortar
- M1128 mobile gun system
- M109L
- M1299 155 mm SP howitzer
- M270 multiple launch rocket system
- M1064 mortar carrier
- M10 Booker

=== Self-propelled air defense ===
- M42 40 mm self-propelled anti-aircraft gun
- M163 Vulcan air defense system
- M247 Sgt. York DIVAD
- M6 Bradley Linebacker SHORAD
- M730 Chaparral self-propelled SAM launcher
- M167 VADS

=== Engineering support vehicles ===
- M1150 assault breacher vehicle (military engineering vehicle)
- Caterpillar D9 armored bulldozer

=== Multirole AFVs ===
- Cadillac Gage LAV 300, configurable as a self-propelled anti-air vehicle, armoured personnel carrier or anti-tank missile carrier.
- An armoured Humvee, depending on its configuration, may serve as a reconnaissance vehicle, infantry mobility vehicle or, when equipped with a TOW missile launcher, a light anti-tank vehicle.

=== Other AFVs ===
- M132 armored flamethrower
- M58 Wolf smoke generation vehicle
- M1 Panther II (mine clearing vehicle)

== Vietnam ==
AFVs produced in Vietnam.

=== Infantry fighting vehicles ===
- XCB-01

=== Amphibious armoured personnel carriers ===
- XTC-02
- XTC-03

== Zimbabwe ==
AFVs produced in Zimbabwe

=== Armoured personnel carriers ===
- Crocodile Armoured Personnel Carrier
- MAP45 Armoured Personnel Carrier
- MAP75 Armoured Personnel Carrier

=== Infantry fighting vehicles ===
- Mine Protected Combat Vehicle – MPCV
- Bullet TCV (prototype only)
- Gazelle FRV (prototype only)

== See also ==
- List of armoured fighting vehicles
- List of military vehicles
- List of armoured fighting vehicles by country
