= BDX =

BDX may refer to:

- BD (company), or Becton Dickinson, an American medical technology company, stock ticker BDX
- BDX, a version of the Timoney armoured personnel carrier
