= Boragh =

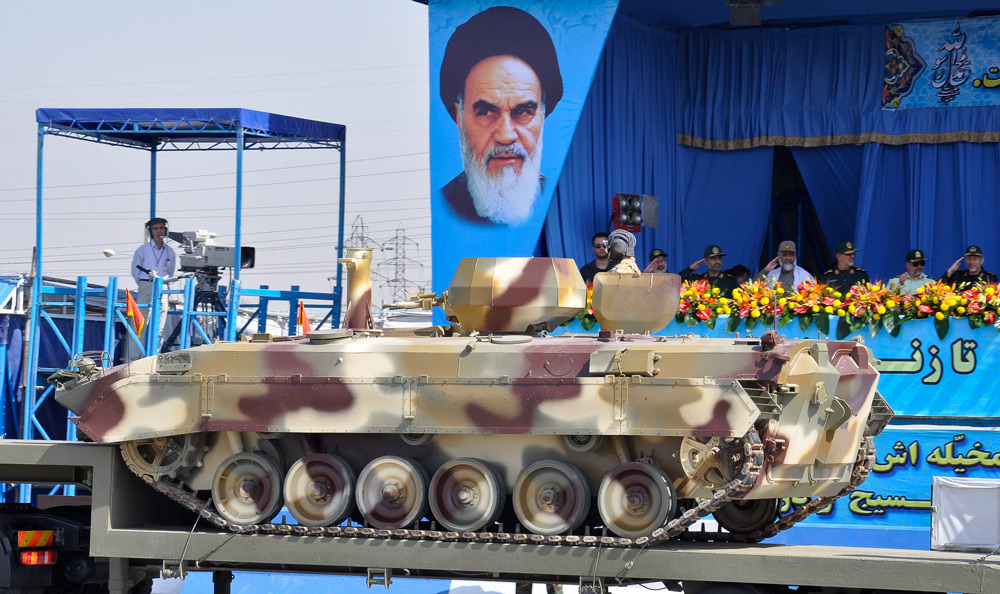
- Type: Armoured personnel carrier
- Place of origin: Iran

Service history
- Used by: See Operators

Production history
- Manufacturer: Defense Industries Organization (Iran); MIC (Sudan)
- Produced: 1997–present

Specifications
- Mass: 13 tons
- Length: 6.72 m
- Width: 3.10 m
- Height: 1.66 m
- Crew: 3 (+8 passengers)
- Armor: Welded rolled steel
- Main armament: 12.7 mm DShK 1938/46 heavy machine gun (1,000 rounds), 30 mm cannon, 120 mm mortar or a Toophan ATGM launcher
- Secondary armament: unknown
- Engine: V-8 diesel 330 hp (246 kW)
- Power/weight: 25.4 hp/tonne (18.9 kW/tonne)
- Suspension: torsion bar
- Operational range: 550 km
- Maximum speed: 65 km/h (road); 45 km/h (off-road)

The Boragh or Boraq (Persian: نفربر براق) is an Iranian-made armoured personnel carrier. The Boragh is believed to be a reverse engineered and upgraded model of the Chinese Type 86 (BMP-1). The upgrades include a reduction in weight, a higher road speed, and stronger armor. The vehicle is fully amphibious and is fitted with an NBC protection system and infrared night vision equipment.

== History ==
The APC was first developed in 1997. Iran's plans for a three-per-month production rate for the Boragh was achieved in 2000.

It was reported in May 2002 that three additional variants are produced by the Vehicle and Equipment Group (VEIG) of the Iranian Defence Industries Organisation (DIO). These are a 120 mm mortar carrier, an ammunition resupply vehicle, and an armoured personnel carrier (APC) fitted with improved armaments.

== Design ==
Boragh is a tracked APC. Rubber elements on the track are added to prevent damage on paved surfaces. It has a crew of three (driver, commander and gunner).

It can transport up to 8 infantry soldiers. Boragh's main armament consists of the DShK 1938/46 12.7 mm heavy machine gun on a rotatable mount. Some vehicles have the machine gun mount protected all around by an armoured shield.

The vehicle is equipped with an NBC protection system and is capable of laying down a defensive smoke screen by injecting diesel fuel into the exhaust outlet.

The vehicle is named after the Buraq, a winged steed from Islamic mythology.

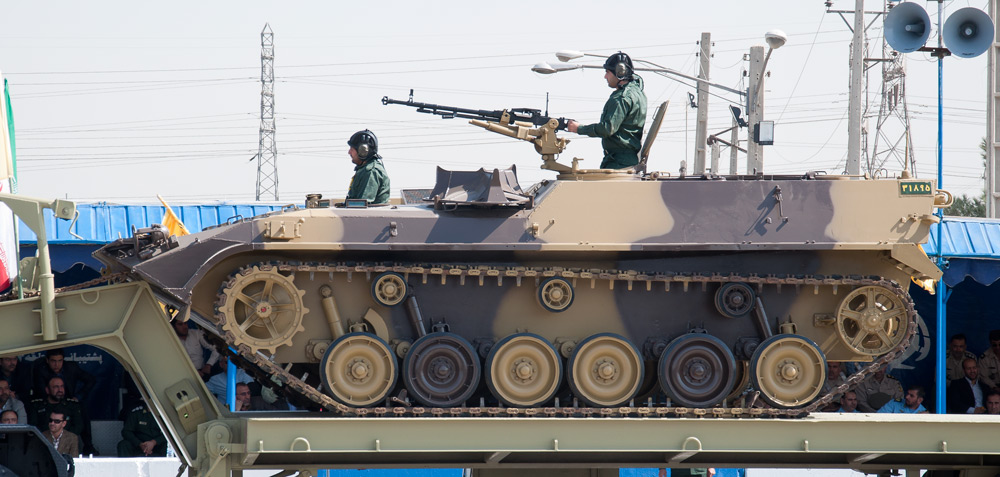
Boragh mortar carrier

== Variants ==
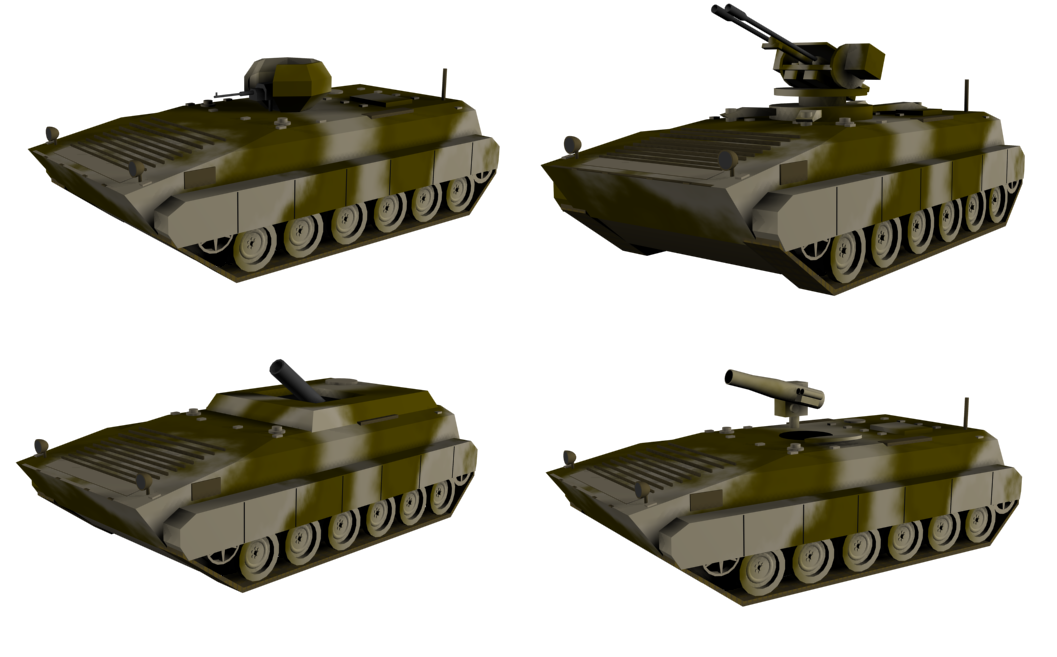
Different versions of Boragh from the top-left: APC, Anti-air threats, Mortar-carrier and Anti-tank

The following are variants of the Boragh:

=== Iran ===
- Boragh – Reverse engineered BMP-1 or Type 86 (WZ-501) converted into an APC. It is very similar to Chinese WZ-503 APC. It has V-8 turbocharged diesel engine which delivers 330 hp (246 kW). It also has road wheels from the US M113 APC. Combat weight was reduced to 13 tonnes. The other upgrades include a higher road speed and stronger armor. Number of passengers was increased from 8 to 12. The 12.7 mm DShK 1938/46 heavy machine gun (1,000 rounds) serves as a main weapon of the vehicle.
  - Boragh APC with a shield around DShK 1938/46 heavy machine gun mount.
  - Boragh converted into an IFV. The armament is mounted in a turret. The primary armament consists of the 2A42 30 mm autocannon stabilized in both planes with a double-belt feed. The secondary armament consists of the PKT 7.62 mm tank machine gun, mounted coaxially with the gun. The vehicle is also armed with a mount for an anti-tank guided missile system. Some were also fitted with the complete turret of the BMP-1, armed with a 73mm smoothbore gun.
  - Boragh armed with 120 mm mortar.
  - Boragh with 1-man turret armed with the Toophan ATGM system.
  - Raad-1 (Thunder-1) – Boragh converted into a self-propelled howitzer fitted with a turret from the 2S1 Gvozdika.
  - Cobra – Concept vehicle for the Boragh armed with 23 mm anti-aircraft gun for use as a fire support vehicle.
  - Boragh converted into an ammunition resupply vehicle.

=== Sudan ===
- Khatim 1 – Sudanese designation for Boragh.
- Khatim 2 – Variant of Khatim 1, houses a mortar.

== Operators ==
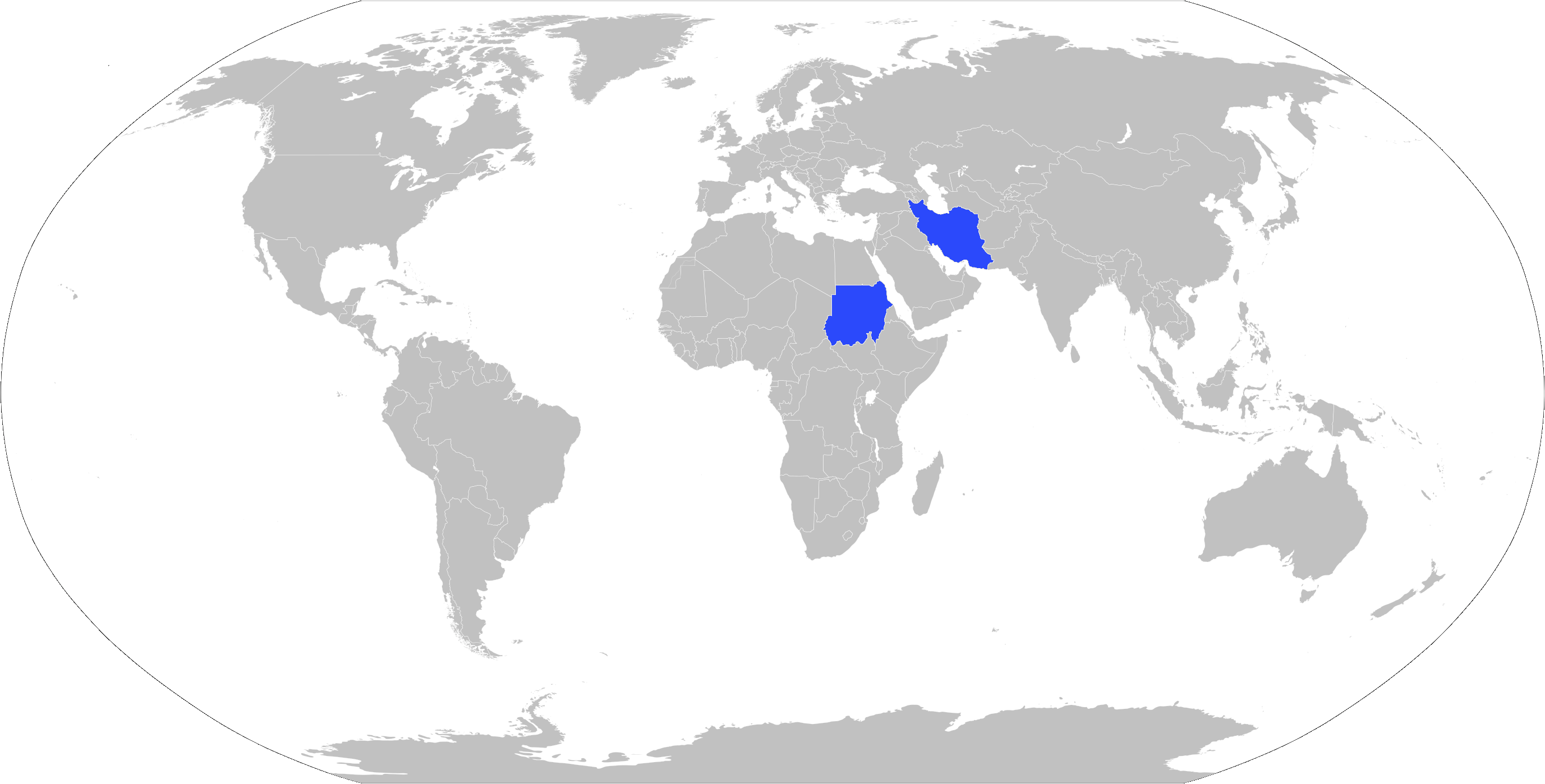
Boragh Operators in blue

- Iran – Around 40 in service as of 2000 and 2002. 140 in service as of 2005, 2008 and 2023.
- Sudan – 10 ordered in 2001 from Iran and delivered in 2003. Some domestically assembled.

== Sources ==
- Boragh armored infantry fighting vehicle fas.org
