= Cobra BMT-2 APC =

Cobra BMT-2
- Type: Infantry fighting vehicle
- Place of origin: Iran

Production history
- Designed: 1996
- Produced: July 1997

Specifications
- Armor: welded steel
- Main armament: 23mm-30mm autocannon
- Secondary armament: unknown
- Engine: diesel
- Suspension: torsion bar

The Cobra BMT-2 (Persian: کبرا بی‌ام‌تی-۲) is an Iranian Infantry fighting vehicle armed with a 30 mm autocannon or a ZU-23-2 anti-aircraft gun.

== History ==
The Cobra began field testing with the Iranian Military in May 1996. In July 1997, Iranian President Hashemi Rafsanjani of Iran formally opened a production line that would produce the BMT-2 as well as the Zulfiqar main battle tank and Boragh tracked armored personnel carriers.

== Operators ==
- Iran

== See also ==
- Military of Iran
- Iranian military industry
- Equipment of the Iranian army
