= Timoney (armoured personnel carrier) =

Irish armoured personnel carrier

Timoney APC
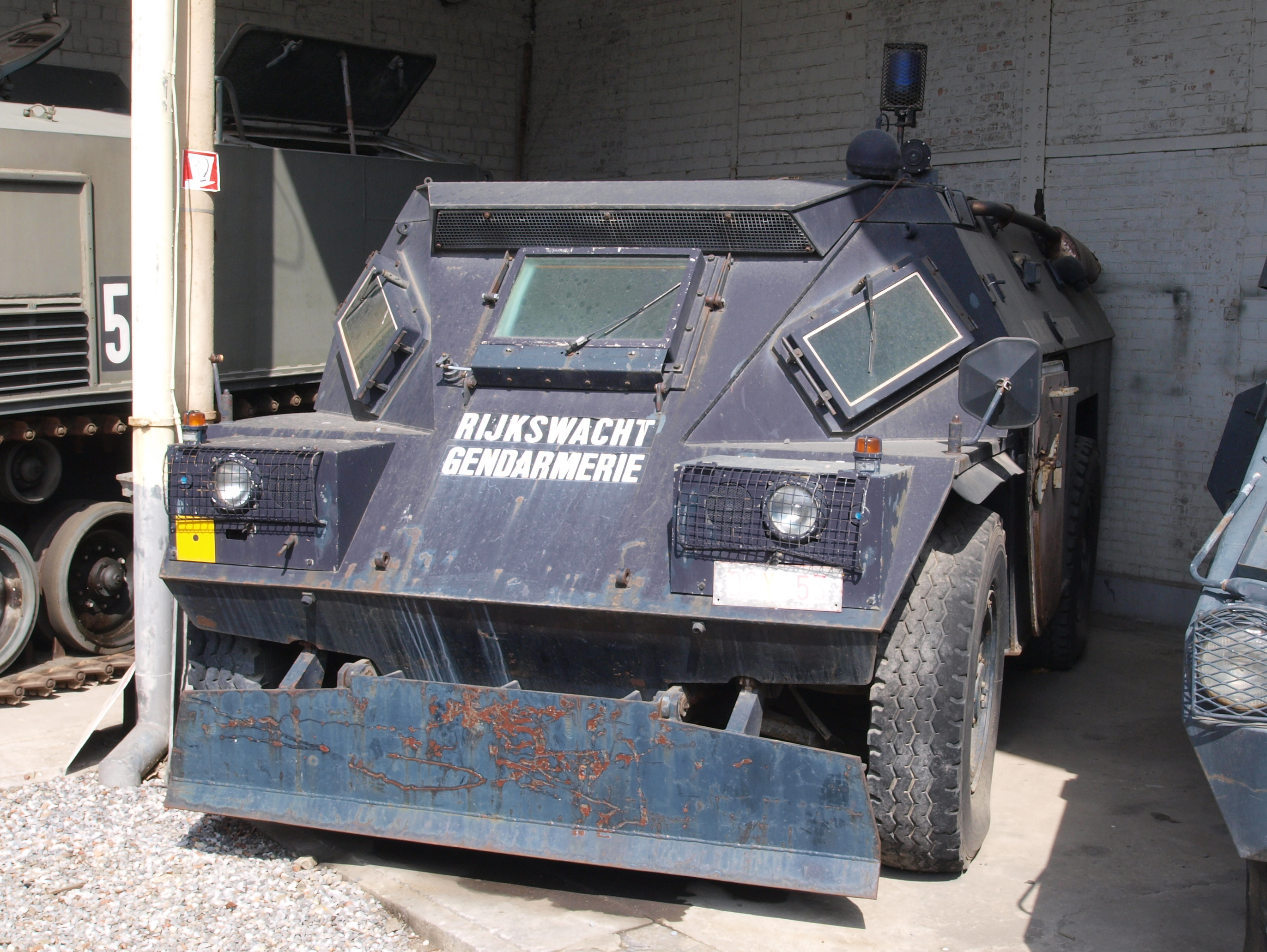
- License-built BDX formerly used by the Belgian Gendarmerie
- Place of origin: Ireland

Service history
- Used by: See Operators

Production history
- Designer: Timoney Technology
- Manufacturer: Timoney Technology; Beherman Demoen; Vickers
- Produced: 1973–1981
- No. built: 136

Specifications
- Mass: Mark 1-3: 6.35 tonnes; Mark 4-5: 9.98 tonnes; Mark 6 : ??? tonnes
- Length: 5.05 m (16 ft 7 in)
- Width: 2.5 m (8 ft 2 in)
- Height: 2.06 m (6 ft 9 in)
- Crew: 2
- Passengers: 10
- Main armament: Mark 1-5: 2x 7.62mm machinegun Mark 6: 12.7mm machinegun
- Secondary armament: Mark 6: Coaxial 7.62mm machinegun
- Engine: Mark 1-5:Chrysler 361 cu.in. V8 petrol engine Mark 6: Detroit Diesel 453 two-cycle diesel engine 180 bhp (130 kW)
- Drive: 4x4
- Transmission: Mark 1-5: Allison AT540 4 speed automatic transmission to Timoney transfer gearbox Mark 6: Allison AT545 automatic transmission to Timoney transfer gearbox
- Operational range: 900 km (560 mi)
- Maximum speed: 100 km/h (62 mph) maximum

The Timoney armoured personnel carrier refers to a series of armored personnel carriers developed by Timoney Technology Limited of Ireland in the 1970s and 1980s.

== Production history ==
=== Mk I, II, III, ===
In the early 1970s against the background of the escalating Troubles in Northern Ireland the Irish Government decided to expand the Irish Army. In 1972 Séamus Timoney, a professor at University College Dublin (who had previously contributed to the design of the British FV601 Saladin and FV603 Saracen armoured vehicles) offered to design a new APC, based on requirements developed in coordination with the Irish Army. The designers believed that the experience of the British Army in Northern Ireland had shown that APCs designed for conventional warfare had several drawbacks when used in an urban counter-insurgency role. The new APC was planned to be suitable for urban guerrilla warfare while still being able to fulfil the demands of a conventional conflict. The vehicle was specified to have all-around small arms armor-piercing protection and to provide the driver with an unobstructed field of view without compromising protection; good vision was considered essential for urban operations. Protection against petrol bombs was also required. The vehicle was to be easily dismountable and provide the crew with firing ports and be equipped with a turret armed with twin machine-guns. Easy handling characteristics were considered important to minimise driver fatigue, and to give a comfortable ride while being capable of effectively traversing off-road. The APC also had to be amphibious without preparation. High traction was required to breach street barricades and other obstacles. The production vehicle also needed to be capable of being manufactured without a sophisticated industrial base, which Ireland lacked.

The final Timoney design was built of high-hardness steel with three doors for easy egress, optimised for urban combat. The driver's front window was also hinged for use as an emergency exit. The seven firing ports covered the sides and rear of the vehicle. The roof mounted air intakes incorporated a baffle system to prevent incendiary materials from entering the fighting compartment. The exhaust pipes running along the edge of the roof were left uncovered to dissuade any attempt to climb onto the APC. The chosen powerplant was a Chrysler 360 V8 for reliability, availability and also compatibility with serving Irish Army vehicles. The Allison AT 540 fully automatic transmission was intended to reduce driver fatigue. The APC was rear-wheel drive on road and 4x4 off-road, and the axle units, which were contained within the hull, had oil-immersed multiple disc brakes at each output shaft, so they wouldn't be exposed outside the armoured body. Final power delivery to the wheels was by a patented epicyclic reduction gear in the wheel hub. The wheels were suspended on a wishbone suspension with helical coil springs and adjustable co-axial hydraulic dampers. Reportedly, the wishbone and kingpin bearings were of a "unique design" which required zero maintenance.

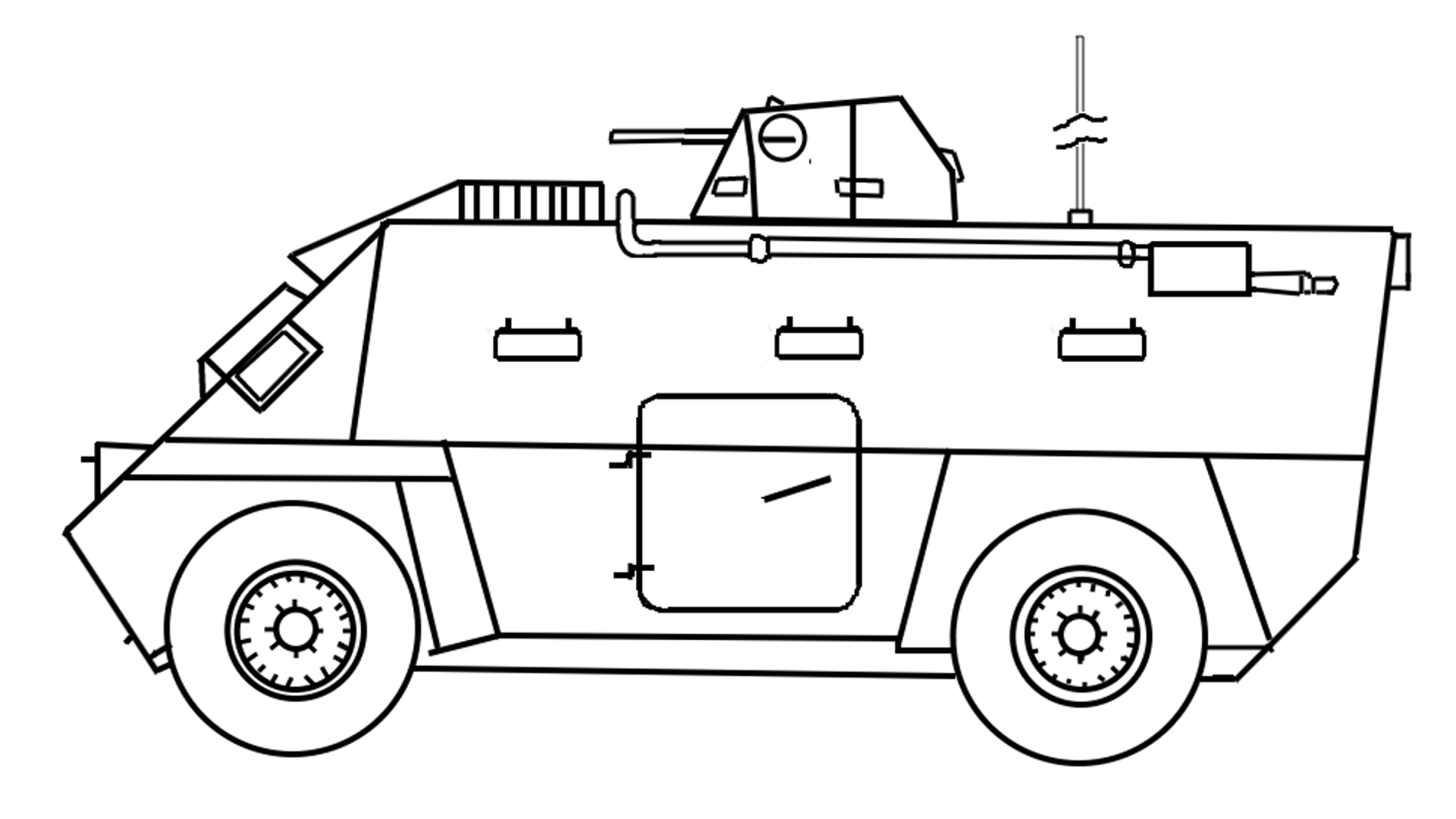
Timoney Mk3

Timoney Technology built three prototypes which were designated MkI, MkII, and MkIII. The MkI was planned to be built with a wooden mock-up body but was constructed with armoured plate to gain experience. The prototype was inadequate as an armoured personnel carrier but served as a testbed for mechanical components, air intake arrangement, crew ergonomics and more. It was delivered to the Irish Army in October 1973 and was withdrawn from testing in 1974 after a variety of problems emerged, the main one being engine overheating that couldn't be corrected without re-designing hull. It was cannibalised for parts for the two successor prototype vehicles after testing concluded. The MkII prototype was fitted with an improvised engine cooling system and was delivered to the army in April 1974, and withdrawn 1977 after encountering mechanical problems including leaking oil seals. It was used as a source of spare parts for the next iteration. The MkIII prototype incorporated a wider frontal air intake and less pronounced downward-sloping upper hull sides. It was delivered to the army in July 1974. Its unclear when it was withdrawn from inventory, however, by April 1980 it had covered 12,537 miles.

A family of vehicles utilising the drivetrain of the Timoney APC was envisioned including an armoured reconnaissance vehicle, an amphibious load carrier, a six-wheeled APC variant and an artillery tractor. The Irish Government stated their intention was to order 200 Timoney APCs but this procurement plan was shelved and ultimately only three prototypes and eventually 5 MkIVs were ordered, with an additional 5 MkVIs later.

=== Mk IV ===
Five MkIV APCs were ordered by the Irish government in December 1977, but deliveries weren't completed until 1980 because of a flaws in the armour initially delivered from Creusot-Loire of France. The MkIVs were delivered in three separate batches; two vehicles on June 14, 1979, two more on November 5, 1979, and the last example in 1980. The vehicles were essentially a pre-production batch of vehicles and suffered from a number of mechanical faults including leaky brake seals. In time these teething problems were solved and the type was used in service by the Irish Army's Cavalry Corps.

=== Mk VI ===
The MkVI APC was a significantly improved version of the earlier MkIV APC, incorporating a Detroit Diesel 453 turbo diesel engine and reworked hull. It was also more heavily armed and armoured than the MKIV, mounting a Creusot-Loire TLi 127 turret armed with an (0.5 inch (12.7 mm) M2 Browning heavy machine gun and a 7.62 mm FN MAG machine gun. The MkVI hull had several advances on its predecessor including a redesigned glacis plate, driver's vision ports which were lower, more horizontal and placed slightly forward of the slope of the glacis plate. The wheelbase was increased from 2.87 metres to 3 metres while the track was widened from 1.93 to 2.2 metres, the expanded hull meant the weight grew to approximately 8000 kg. The MkVI was the definitive production version of the Timoney APC, but like the preceding MkIV only five were ordered in what was essentially a pre-production batch. Although the MKVI experienced minor teething troubles, these were quickly rectified and they stayed in service up to the year 1999. The MkVIs were reportedly popular with soldiers assigned to them and had lower maintenance costs compared to the Army's primary APC, the Panhard M3.

A MkVI fire support variant fitted with a 90 mm GIAT Lynx Turret was evaluated but despite being successfully trialed no orders were placed for the upgunned variant of the APC. A MkIV was also demonstrated with a turret mounting a 20mm autocannon in 1984.

== Derivatives ==
=== Timoney 6x6 armoured reconnaissance vehicle ===
In the early 1980s Timoney presented a 6x6 reconnaissance derivative of their APC design. The hull resembled the firm's APC but longer with an extra pair of roadwheels and side-doors deleted. Two variants were offered, the first with a 200 bhp engine and armed with a 90 mm turret. The second was to utilise a 320 hp engine and was armed with a French FL-12 turret mounting a 105 mm CN-105 L/57 gun, used by some variants of the AMX-13 light tank. The design was armoured against 12.7 mm rounds in the frontal arc and had 7.62 mm protection all-around, but with an up-armour option for 12.7 mm resistance covering the entire vehicle. Unlike the APC family, it was propeller driven in water rather than relying on road wheels alone. The extra pair of roadwheels gave the design greatly improved trench-crossing and obstacle-climbing capabilities compared to the 4x4 Timoney APC.

=== Timoney 4x4 armoured reconnaissance vehicle ===
The Timoney 4x4 armoured reconnaissance vehicle (ARV) was a reconnaissance vehicle based on the drive components of the APC, but powered by a Perkins T6.3544 diesel engine. The design also incorporated Trelleborg AB run-flat tyres. The ARV was fitted with the two-man turret from the FV101 Scorpion armed with a 76 mm gun. The commander sat on the left and the gunner on the right. Traverse was manual but an electric drive could be installed. Timoney designed, built and tested two prototypes of the armoured reconnaissance vehicle in Ireland. The design reportedly then went into production in Tanzania for their armed forces under a technology transfer agreement. In the early 1980s Tanzanian engineers were brought to Ireland for training to facilitate the transfer. The ARV was one of a number of Timoney all-terrain vehicle designs the Tanzanian government hoped to manufacture domestically.

Timoney later designed a greatly improved version of the ARV 4x4 dubbed the Mk 2. Performance in water during amphibious operation was enhanced with the addition of water jets and power-to-weight ratio upgraded with a Detroit Diesel turbo diesel engine. Armour protection was also thickened with the hull able to resist 20 mm rounds in the frontal arc.

=== BDX (Timoney Mk V) ===
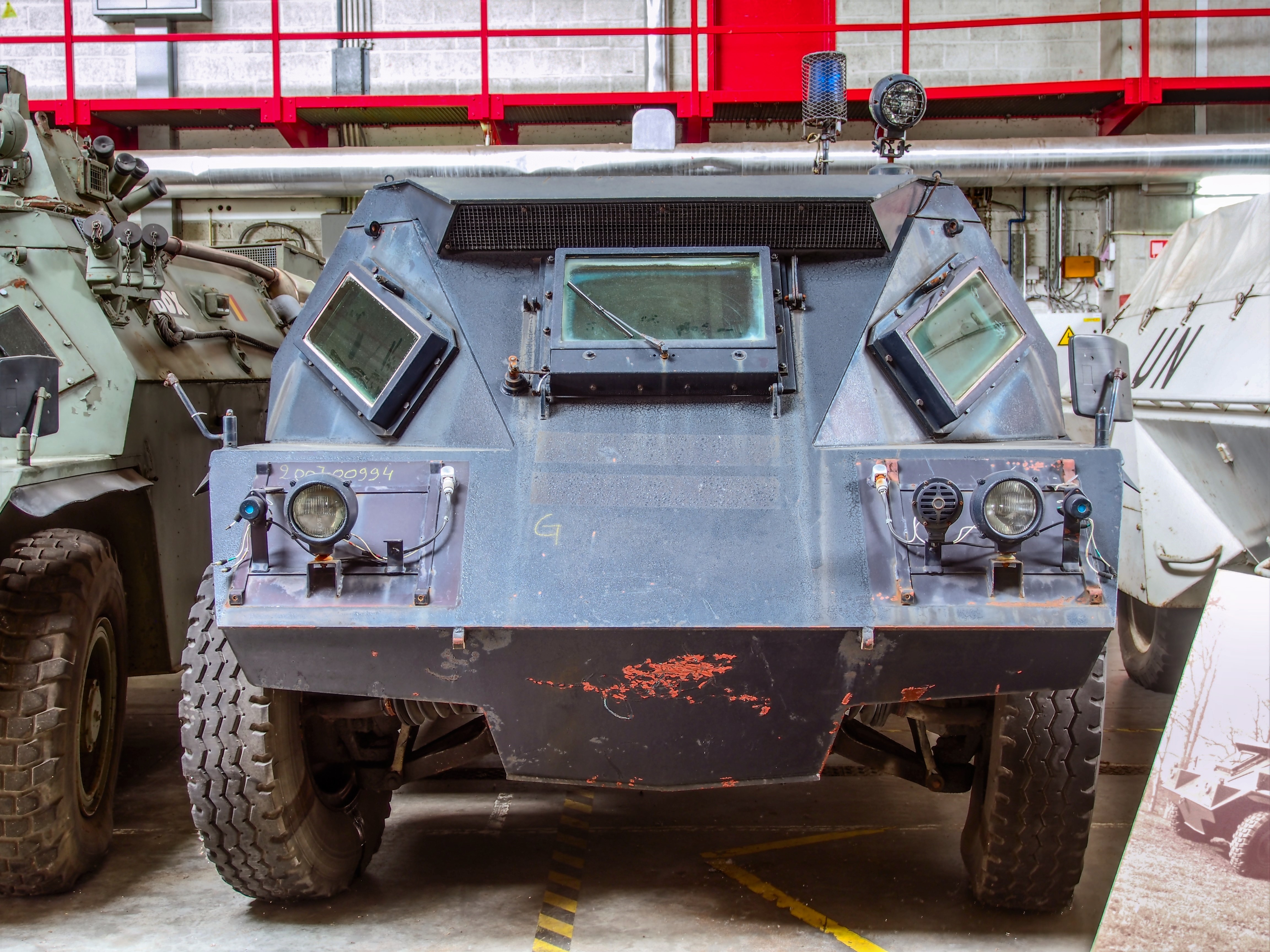
BDX

In 1977 production began under licence of an improved Timoney MkIV (also known as the MkV) by Beherman Demoen Engineering of Belgium, following negotiations the previous year. The vehicle, named the BDX is very similar to the Timoney design but with some modifications to meet Belgian requirements. The basic BDX APC lacks a turret, and an NBC collective protection or air conditioning system can be installed. Some vehicles had a small dozer blade mounted for obstacle clearing. Similar to the base Timoney design it was also possible to install a turret on the forward hull roof to accommodate either one or two 7.62 mm machine guns. Other armament options offered were a 20 mm cannon, a breech loaded 81 mm mortar or a 90 mm gun. Various other modifications have been proposed, including a turreted MILAN anti-tank missile carrier, an ambulance and a 51 mm multiple launch rocket system. A diesel engine was also tested as a possible customer option.

The first production order for the BDX was awarded by the Belgian government in 1977 and called for the delivery of 43 vehicles to the Belgian Air Force for airfield protection duties and 80 vehicles to the Belgian Gendarmerie. The air force vehicles were armed with a ring-mounted 7.62 mm light machine gun. The gendarmerie included 13 vehicles with an 81 mm mortar installed in the back of the hull, firing through a roof hatch. The first batch of production vehicles were presented in 1978 and production was completed for the Belgian government by February 1981. BDX also delivered five vehicles to Argentina. All operable former Belgian vehicles were delivered to Mexico after they were phased out.

=== Vickers Valkyr ===
First presented to the public in 1982 and originally conceived as the BDX Mk2, the Vickers Valkyr was a BDX (Timoney Mk V) with a re-designed front hull and refined suspension. It had the same Timoney-designed twin 7.62mm machinegun turret. Later designs had a commanders hatch on the front left and a ring-mount machinegun in place of a turret. There was also a variant with a lowered hull mounting a Cockerill Mk3 90mm gun. The Valkyr was offered to the British Army but the more economical Saxon APC was chosen instead. Despite an intensive marketing effort the only export order secured were two vehicles for Kuwait in 1989.

The Vickers Mk.11 Viper was a wheeled fire support vehicle, capable of carrying infantry and intended to carry out reconnaissance and long-range patrols. The first prototype was derived from the Timoney CM-31 6x6 armoured personnel carrier with the front-end of the Valkyr fire-support variant. The second prototype was believed to have been built by Vickers at their facility. The vehicle was fitted with the turret from Vickers Mk.5 (VFM5) light tank mounting a fully-stabilised L7 105 mm gun. The Vickers Mk.11 had a crew of four and could carry 7 dismounts and there were firing ports for troops to fire their individual weapons. A family of variants derived from the Mk.11 were planned including ATGM carrier, 120 mm mortar carrier, SPAAG, enlarged APC that could carry up to 19 troops, command vehicle, armoured ambulance, logistics vehicle, and recovery vehicle. The platform failed to garner any export sales and with Vickers acquisition of Reumech to form Vickers OMC (now Land Systems OMC) the Mk.11 program was cancelled and the second prototype sold to a private collector.

== Operators ==
- Ireland: Three prototypes, 5 Mk IV, 5 MK VI
- Belgium:
  - Belgian Air Component - 63 BDX
  - Rijkswacht/Gendarmerie - 80 BDX
- Argentina: 5 BDX
- Mexico: 95 former Belgian BDX
- Kuwait: 2 Vickers Valkyr
- Tanzania: 2 Armoured Reconnaissance Vehicle.
