= Saxon (vehicle) =

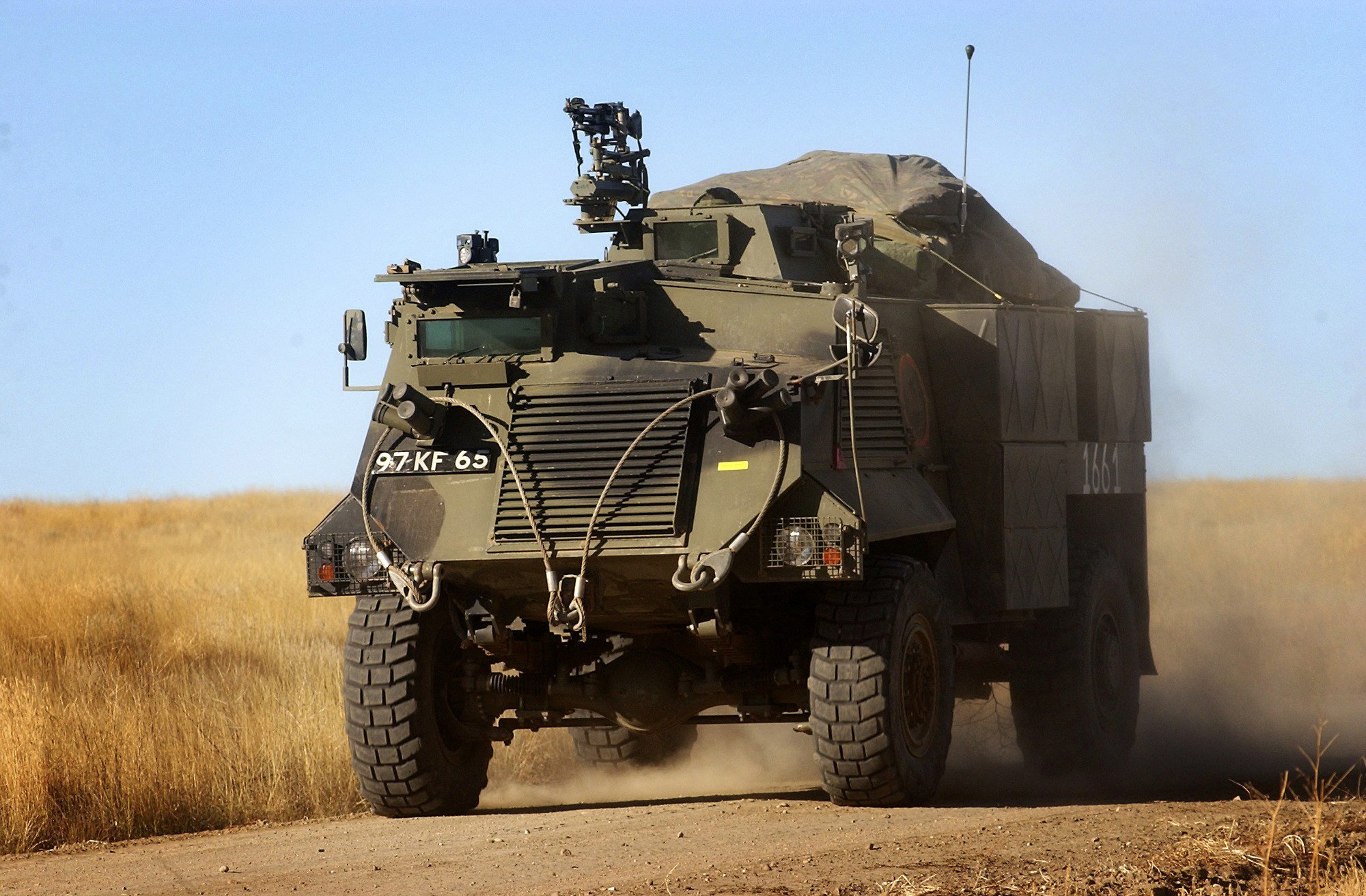
- A Saxon Armoured Personnel vehicle from the Cheshire Regiment, British Army, 2003
- Type: Armoured personnel carrier
- Place of origin: United Kingdom

Service history
- In service: 1976–present
- Used by: Operators
- Wars: Cold War; The Troubles; Gulf War; Bosnian War; Kosovo War; War in Afghanistan (2001–2021); Iraq War; Russo-Ukrainian War

Production history
- Designer: GKN Sankey
- Designed: 1975–1976
- Manufacturer: GKN Sankey; Alvis; Alvis Vickers; BAE Systems

Specifications
- Mass: 9,940 kg (21,910 lb) (standard); 11,660 kg (25,710 lb) (combat)
- Length: 5.17 m (17 ft 0 in)
- Width: 2.49 m (8 ft 2 in)
- Height: 2.86 m (9 ft 5 in)
- Crew: 2
- Main armament: 7.62 mm MG
- Secondary armament: none
- Engine: Bedford 500 6-cyl diesel 164 hp (122 kW)
- Power/weight: 14.06 hp/t (10.48 kW/t)
- Payload capacity: 10 passengers
- Transmission: Allison AT-545 automatic with 4 forward gears and 1 reverse gear
- Suspension: leaf spring with hydraulic shock absorbers
- Fuel capacity: 153 L (34 imp gal)
- Operational range: 510 km (320 mi)
- Maximum speed: 96 km/h (60 mph)

The Saxon is an armoured personnel carrier formerly used by the British Army and supplied in small numbers to various overseas organisations. It was developed by GKN Sankey from earlier projects, AT 100 IS and AT104, and was due to be replaced by the Future Rapid Effect System.

== History ==
The British Army initially ordered a batch of 47 vehicles in early 1983, with first deliveries taking place in early 1984.

The second order for the British Army was a batch of 247 vehicles with the option for a further 200, the latter exercised in late 1985. The final deliveries of the 447 vehicles was complete by early 1989.

The Royal Artillery ordered 30 Saxons for use as command post vehicles armed with Rapier missiles. These vehicles were all delivered in early 1987.

In 1990, the British Ministry of Defence placed an order of around 100 vehicles as well an order of Saxon ambulances, with first deliveries taking place in 1991. These vehicles had a number of improvements over earlier models, including a Cummins 6BT 5.91-litre turbocharged six-cylinder diesel engine developing 160 bhp coupled with a fully automatic transmission.

The first operational Saxons were deployed in Germany in 1983, to equip mechanised infantry battalions. The Saxon has now been withdrawn from service in HM Armed Forces, but 147 are kept in storage. The Saxon has been deployed to places such as Bahrain, Brunei, Bosnia, Malaysia, Northern Ireland, Oman, Iraq and Afghanistan.

Seven Saxons were ordered by the Royal Hong Kong Police from GKN Sankey in 1987 and delivered in 1988 where they replaced 15 Saracens. They were assigned to the Police Tactical Unit and remained there until withdrawn in 2009. In the Balkans, Saxons were outfitted with turrets taken from FV432s to serve as an improvised anti-sniper turret.

75 Saxons were sold to Ukraine reportedly under a contract made in 2013, i.e. predating the start of the Russo-Ukrainian War. The Ukrainian military announced the deal on 5 December 2014. The former chief commander of British land forces, Richard Dannatt, said that supplying the vehicles to Ukraine was "immoral" as they were "useless" in high intensity warfare. Most of them were outfitted with DShK and dual PK GPMGs.

In Ukrainian service, the type has seen combat against Russian forces during the 2022 Russian invasion of Ukraine. As of May 2024, available video and photographic evidence indicates Ukraine has lost at least 14 Saxons during the invasion, with 8 being captured by Russian forces and 6 being destroyed.

The last reported sighting of a Saxon in Ukrainian service was in January 2024. Due to their age and poor condition after eight years of combat use, they have been largely replaced with modern MRAPs provided by the United Kingdom and other allied nations.

== Design ==
The Saxon was developed by GKN Defence (now BAE Systems) as the successor of the AT104.

Main improvements over the AT104 include changes in the armoured hull to provide an equal level of protection to the radiator, engine, transmission and crew; a redesigned hull floor to improve protection against landmines; a more powerful diesel engine and a shorter wheelbase for improved mobility and turning.

The hull is all-welded steel with the driver seated at the front on the right side (left-hand drive versions were also available for export) and the personnel compartment in the rear.

The driver can reach his seat from inside the vehicle or by an hatch over his position. There are bulletproof windscreens on the front and both sides.

The commander's cupola has four sides each with a vision block and a single-piece hatch cover. A 7.62 mm machine gun can be pintle-mounted if necessary. The commander module can be removed and replaced with another module with a different armament installation.

The personnel sits on padded bench seats located on each side of the vehicle which are equipped with seat belts, and leave by two doors on the rear and a single door in each side of the hull. Each door have a firing port and a vision block. There are additional firing ports in each side of the hull and a single firing port in the left forward side of the vehicle. The interior of the hull is lined with a 26 mm (1.0 in) thick thermal insulation and a forced air circulation system was installed by default on all vehicles.

The armoured hull provides protection against small arms including 7.62 mm armour-piercing rounds, and high-explosive shell fragments up to 155 mm (6.1 in) bursting at 10 m (33 ft) from the vehicle. The floor is V-shaped to give maximum protection against mine blasts, except for the axles, which are outside of the armoured compartment.

In British service, each vehicle carried a fully equipped rifle squad of 10. The British Army Saxons originally had a fixed observation cupola for the commander with a socket in each corner of the cupola for a 7.62 mm general-purpose machine gun mount, no door on the left side of the vehicle, and fully enclosed external stowage bins. A total of 515 vehicles were fitted with L8 66 mm smoke grenade launchers.

== Variants ==
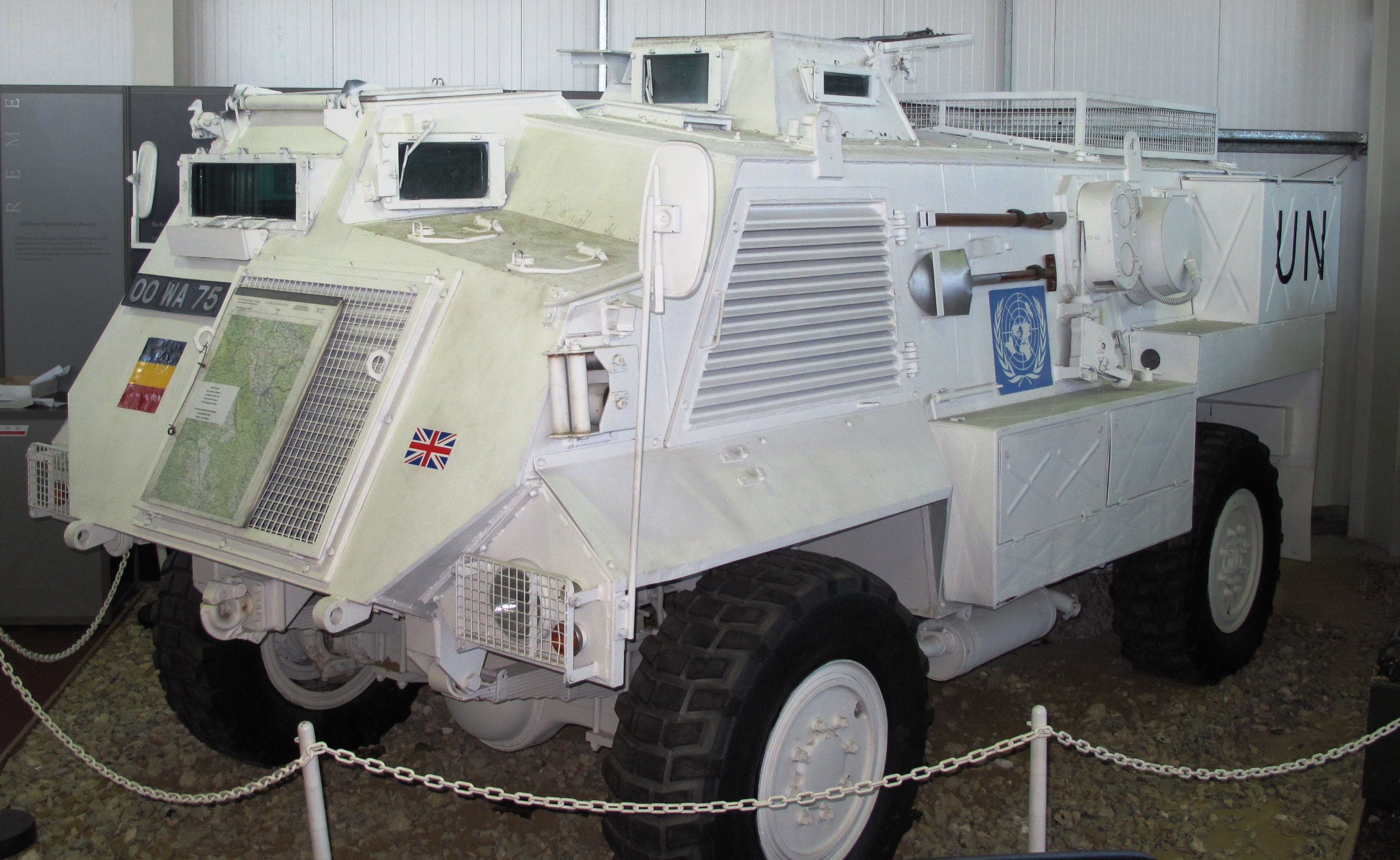
A British Army Saxon ARV on display at the REME Museum painted in UN colours.

- Saxon LHD armoured personnel carrier – This variant is fitted with a turret armed with a single or twin 7.62 mm GPMG, with an elevation of 50° and a depression of −15°. It can also be used to deploy and operate remote controlled vehicles for bomb disposal duties. The Jordan Design and Development Bureau (KADDB) was involved in the conversion from right-hand drive to left-hand drive with the first working models presented in 2010.
- Saxon command vehicle – Can be fitted with a turret armed with a single or twin 7.62 mm GPMGs or a .50 (12.7 mm) M2HB heavy machine gun. The interior features individual communication control modules, a mapboard with strip lighting, and a storage space.
- Saxon recovery vehicle – Features a Hudson Wharton capstan 5,000 kg (11,000 lb) hydraulic winch that can lift vehicles weighing up 16,000 kg (35,000 lb) with the help of a block and tackle. In British service it was normally operated by a crew of four. A tent can be erected at the rear so repair work can be carried on in all weathers if required. Standard equipment includes tools, a spotlight, Scotch lorry skid pads and a front and rear differential lock.
- Ambulance – The interior is modified to enable two general service stretchers to be carried on each side of the vehicle, or one patient on a stretcher plus five walking wounded. The crew consists of the commander, driver, and a medical orderly.
- Incident control vehicle – A Saxon fitted with a front-mounted obstacle-clearing blade, cage armour, a turret armed with a machine gun and smoke grenade launchers, and a low light TV surveillance system featuring a telescopic mount on the rear of the vehicle.
- Saxon EOD – Specialized vehicle for bomb disposal.
- Saxon Patrol – The final version of the Saxon to enter service with the British Army, it was used in Northern Ireland. Improvements include replacing the Bedford 6-cylinder diesel with a Cummins 6BT 6-cylinder turbocharged diesel engine, a fully automatic transmission that can use a 4×4 or 4×2 drive depending on the tactical situation. Other improvements include barricade removal devices, roof-mounted searchlights, cage armour, a revised cowl for the armoured radiator cover, improved armour, and an upgraded braking system with run-flat tyres fitted as standard.

== Operators ==
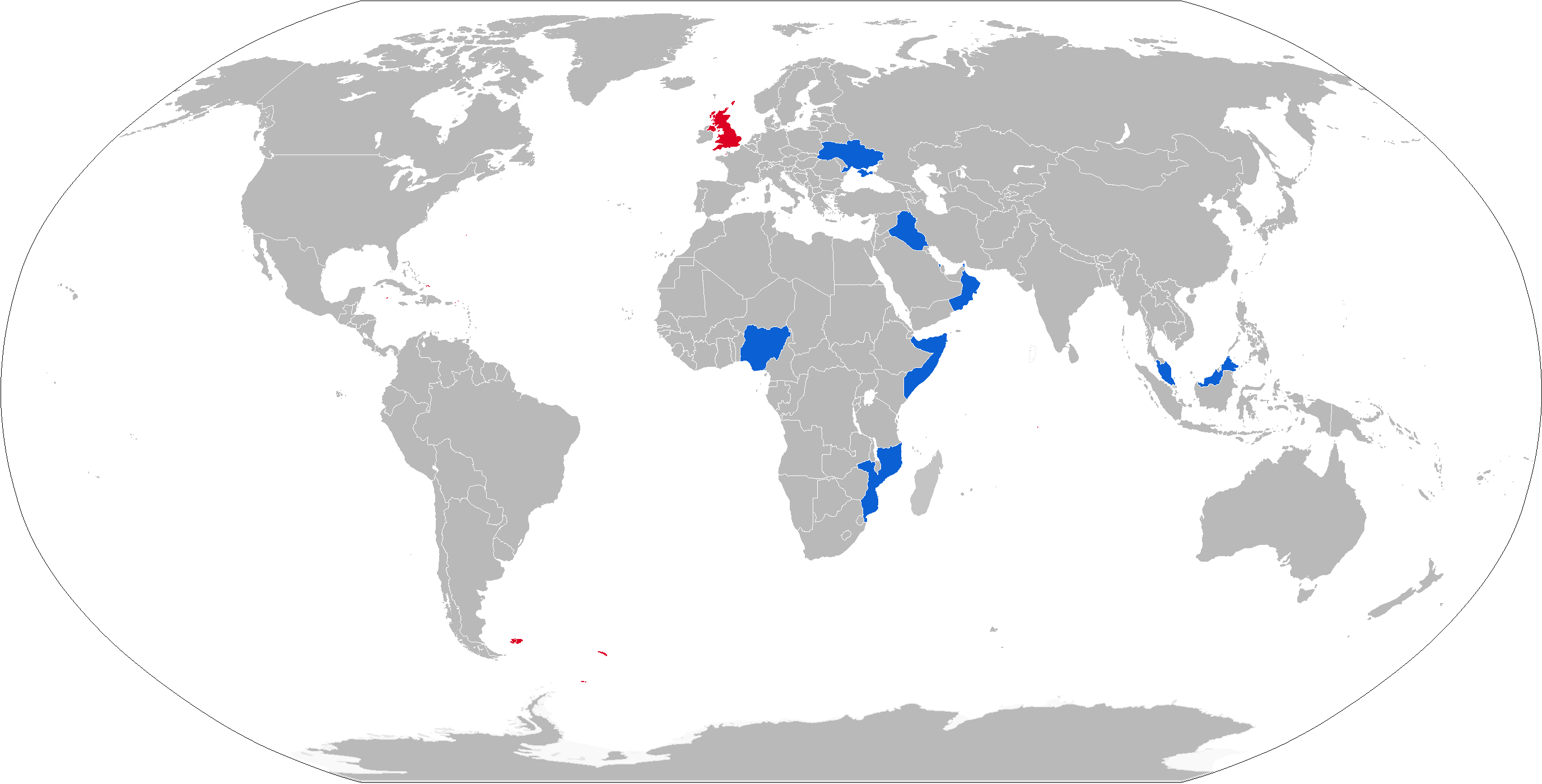
A map of Saxon operators Current Former

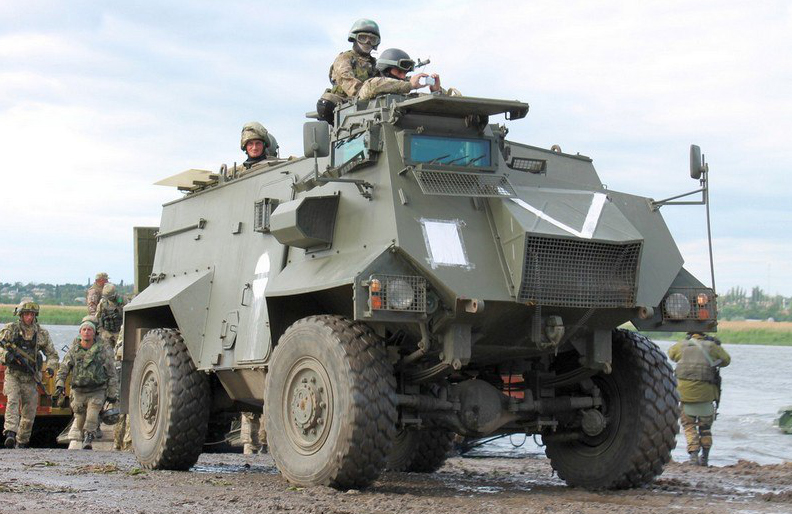
AT-105 Saxon vehicles in the Ukrainian Armed Forces

=== Current ===
- Congo – 28 as of 2024
- Djibouti – 4+ as of 2024
- Jordan – Reportedly still in use by the gendarmerie as of 2024
- Malaysia – 44, Used by the General Operations Force as of 2024
- Mozambique – 25 as of 2024
- Nigeria – 70+ as of 2024, serviceability doubtful
- Oman – 15 as of 2024
- Somalia – 25+ as of 2024
- Ukraine – Ukraine's Ministry of Defense has purchased 75 second-hand vehicles, which have been delivered in two shipments in 2015

=== Former ===
- Bahrain – 10 in 2011
- Hong Kong – 7 delivered to the Hong Kong Police Force Police Tactical Unit in 1988. All retired in 2009 and replaced by Unimog U5000s
- Iraq – 60 delivered in 2007
- Ivory Coast – 4 second-hand vehicles delivered in 2016 for use with MINUSMA
- Mauritania – 4 second-hand vehicles were delivered in 2016 via France for United Nations operation in the Central African Republic
- United Kingdom – 180 in service with the British Army in 2011. All were taken out of service in 2012, with some donated to other nations

=== Non-State Actors ===
- Donetsk People's Republic – Some of the captured Saxons used by DPR forces.

== Bibliography ==
- Armed Forces of the United Kingdom, Charles Heyman. Leo Cooper, 2003.
- Foss, Christopher F., ed. (2011). Jane's Armour and Artillery 2011-2012 (32th ed.). Jane's Information Group. ISBN 978-0-7106-2960-9.
- International Institute for Strategic Studies (2024). The Military Balance 2024. Taylor & Francis. ISBN 978-1-040-05115-3.
