= Venezuelan Marine Corps =

Bolivarian Marine Infantry
- División de Infantería de Marina General Simón Bolívar
- Seal of the Venezuelan Bolivarian Marine Corps
- Active: 22 July 1822 – 1829 (Part of Gran Colombia); 1 July 1938 – present (First official company)
- Country: Venezuela
- Branch: Bolivarian Navy of Venezuela
- Type: Marines
- Size: 11,000
- Garrison/HQ: Meseta de Mamo, Catia La Mar, Vargas
- Colors: Red and Blue
- Engagements: El Porteñazo

Commanders
- Current commander: Vice Admiral Luis Somaza Chacón

The Venezuelan Bolivarian Marine Corps are known as the Bolivarian Marine Infantry or formally as the Marine Division "General Simon Bolivar" (División de Infantería de Marina General Simón Bolívar) and is part of the Bolivarian Navy of Venezuela. Its motto is: Valor y Lealtad (Valor and Loyalty).

== History ==
=== Nineteenth century ===
The Venezuelan Marines trace their history back to the combined marines corps of Gran Colombia which was formed in 1822 and was dissolved in 1829 following Venezuela's secession from Gran Colombia. This was surprising as the Marine Corps of the Confederation largely consisted of Venezuelans. The Marines' most notable engagement in this era was the 1823 Battle of Lake Maracaibo. During this time the Marines were mostly manned by personnel by the Grand Colombian Army, and used army-style ranks while wearing naval uniforms.

=== Twentieth century ===
In the beginning of the 20th century, during the term of President Cipriano Castro, the Navy had a marine artillery command manned by Venezuelan Army personnel tasked to provide artillery crews aboard its vessels.

After years of inactivity the Venezuelan Marines were finally reformed at Puerto Cabello on 1 July 1938 when a company was formed to provide ships detachments. A second company was formed on 8 December 1939 and a third in 1943. They were then merged into the 1st Marine Battalion (Battalion de Infanteria de Marina -BIM) Simon Bolivar, headquartered at Puerto Cabello, on 11 December 1945. This date is looked upon as the official anniversary of the marines.

In February 1946 a second BIM General Rafael Urdaneta was raised at Puerto Cabello and the original BIM became the 1st battalion and was then moved to Marquetia. Marine headquarters was then located in Caracas. The third Battalion Mariscal Antonio Jose de Sucre was then formed up in 1958 at Carupano, the very same year the Marines became a full command of the Navy.

In the late 1970s the Amphibious Assault Company, equipped with LVTP-7s and the Marine Anti-Aircraft Artillery Company, equipped with M42 Dusters, were raised. The 4th Battalion General Francisco de Miranda was raised in the early 1980s and initially consisted of the Amphibious Assault Company and the Marine Anti-Aircraft Artillery Company.

In June 1962, the 2nd Marine Battalion at Puerto Cabello rebelled. The rebellion was put down by the navy and other marines from the 1st and 3rd Marine Battalions.

Between 1975 and 1994 the marines underwent two new adjustments to its organization. In December 2000, the Marine Infantry were honored with the name Gen. Simón Bolívar Marine Division. In October 2003, the Naval Police Command Gran Mariscal de Ayacucho was integrated into the ranks and organization of the Marines.

In April 2005, the Marine Corps of Engineers was activated. In July 2005, they were placed under the General Command of the Navy . The Naval Police Brigade "Gran Mariscal de Ayacucho Antonio José de Sucre" was reestablished as the Naval Police Command, ceasing its dependence on the Division and remained attached to the Naval Operations Command directly.

== Organization ==
Headquartered in Meseta de Mamo, Vargas, the estimated numerical strength of this unit is of approx. 11,000 men and women. Its mission is to "enlist and direct its units in order to form the disembarking force and/or support of amphibious or special operations; executing naval safeguarding and environmental policing, as well as actively participating in the national development". It is divided into 9 active brigades and a headquarters unit.

As of 2020, Vice Admiral Luis Somaza Chacón is the current commandant of the Marine Corps.

== Major Units ==
- Headquarters Battalion
- Marine Communications Battalion CDR Felipe Baptista
- Marine Logistics Support Battalion ADM Luis Brión
- 393rd Marine Air Defense Artillery Battalion RADM José María García
- Marine Corps Basic School
- Marine Special Operations School CPT Rafael Francisco Rodríguez
- 8th Marine Special Operations Command Brigade Generalissimo Francisco de Miranda
  - HQ and Service Company
  - 81st Marine Special Operations (Commando) Battalion LTCDR Henry Lilong Garcia
  - 82nd Marine Force Reconnaissance Battalion GC Jose Felix Ribas
  - 83rd Marine Combat Engineers Battalion Chief Guaicaipuro
  - 84th Marine Special Operations Support Battalion Juan German Roscio
- Naval and Marine Reserve and Marine Replacement Regiment RADM Armando López Conde
  - Regimental HQ
  - Naval Reserve Battalion Battle of Chichiriviche
  - Naval Reserve Battalion Battle of Punta Brava
  - Naval Reserve Battalion Expedición de la Vela de Coro
  - Naval Reserve Battalion Expedición de Los Cayos
  - 1st Marine Reserve Battalion

1st Marine Brigade (Amphibious) CPT Manuel Ponte Rodriguez

- Brigade HQ and Service Company
- 11th Marine Battalion GEN Rafael Urdaneta
- 12nd Marine Battalion (Assault Amphibian) LCDR Manuel Ponce Lugo
- 13th Marine Field Artillery Battalion LTGEN Agustín Codazzi
- 14th Marine Logistics Battalion RADM José Ramón Yépez

2nd Marine Brigade (Amphibious) RADM José Eugenio Hernández

- Brigade HQ and Service Company
- 21st Marine Battalion MSHL Antonio José de Sucre
- 22nd Marine Battalion GEN Santiago Mariño
- 23rd Marine Battalion LTGEN José Francisco Bermudez
- 24th Marine Logistics Battalion GEN Juan Bautista Arismendi
- 25th Marine Field Artillery Battalion LTGEN Juan Antonio Anzoategui

3rd Marine Brigade (Amphibious) MGEN Manuela Saenz

- Brigade HQ and Service Company
- 31st Marine Battalion (Assault Amphibian) GEN Simón Bolívar
- 32nd Marine Battalion ADM Luis Brión
- 33rd Marine Field Artillery Battalion VADM Lino de Clemente
- 34th Marine Logistics Battalion Pedro Gual

4th Marine Brigade (Amphibious) ADM Alejandro Petión

- Brigade HQ and Service Company
- 41st Marine Battalion (Assault Amphibian) Generalissimo Sebastian Francisco de Miranda Rodriguez
- 42nd Marine Battalion RADM Renato Beluche
- 43rd Marine Field Artillery Battalion (Self-Propelled and MRL) MSHL Juan Crisostomo Falcón (new raising)
- 44th Marine Logistics Battalion Ana Maria Campos

5th Marine Riverine Brigade LTCDR José Tomas Machado

- Brigade HQ and Service Company
- 1st Riverine Command LTGEN Daniel Florence O'Leary
- 2nd Riverine Command GEN Ezequiel Zamora
- 3rd Riverine Command Jose Maria Espana
- 1st Marine Fluvial Squadron CPT Antonio Diaz
- 5th Riverline Support Battalion LTJG Vicente Parado
- 5th Marine Air Group LT Pedro Lucas Urribarri

6th Marine Border Riverine Brigade ADM Manuel Ezequeil Bruzual

- Brigade HQ and Service Company
- 5th Riverline Command RADM Jose Maria Garcia
- 6th Border Riverline Command LT Jacinto Muñoz
- 7th Riverine Command LT Pedro Camejo
- 6th Riverine Support Battalion CDR Joaquin Quintero
- 6th Marine Air Group GC Jose Gregorio Monagas

7th Marine Border Riverine Brigade MGEN Franz António Risques Irribarren

- Brigade HQ and Service Company
- 8th Upper Orinoco (Riverine) command VADM Armando Medina
- 9th Middle Orinoco (Riverine) command VADM Francisco Pérez Hernández
- 7th Marine Air Group CPT Sebastian Boguier
- 7th Riverine Support Battalion COL Antonio Ricaurte (raised 2015)

Each border/riverine command consists of the following:

- Command headquarters,
- a headquarters and service company,
- a Marine Battalion,
- a Maintenance company and
- a Service Support company.

These units have a base of operations and five naval outposts with a Marine company and no less than 6 assault and river combat speedboats each.

Naval Police Command Grand Marshal of Ayacucho Antonio José de Sucre

- Command HQ
- Command Staff
- Naval Police Training Center
- 9th Naval Police Brigade
  - Brigade HQ Company
  - 1st Naval Police Battalion CPT Alejo Sánchez Navarro
  - 2nd Naval Police Battalion RADM Matías Padrón
  - 3rd Naval Police Battalion RADM Otto Pérez Seijas
  - 4th Naval Police Battalion CPT Juan Daniel Daniels
- Naval Police Commando Company
  - Naval Police Commando Sniper Platoon
- Naval Police Investigations Division
- Naval Police Canine Training Unit
- Naval Police Finance Division

=== Naval Corps of Engineers ===
Under the direct control of the Navy but operationally deployed with the Marine Corps

1st Naval Construction Brigade RADM José Ramón Yépez

- Brigade HQ
- 141st Combat Engineers Battalion LT Jerónigo Rengifo
- 142nd Maintenance and Construction Battalion RADM José María García
- 143rd Maintenance and Construction Battalion CPT Nicolás Jolly
- 145th Maintenance and Construction Battalion LT Pedro Camejo

2nd Naval Construction Brigade RADM Jose Prudencio Padilla

- Brigade HQ
- 144th Maintenance and Construction Battalion GEN Ezequiel Zamora
- 146th Maintenance and Construction Battalion CPT Agustin Armario

== Arms and equipment ==
Naval Infantry's equipment is the same standard issue as the rest of the armed forces, excluding Special Forces armaments. Armored units and heavy equipment of the Naval Infantry is the following:

Armor

- FMC LVTP-7 Amphibious Assault Armored Vehicle. *US – (1 AAVTC-7 + 1 AAVTR-7 + 9 AAVTP-7) - 11
- NORINCO VN18 Amphibious Light Tank and VN16 Amphibious Assault APC. * China (25 VN18 + 25 VN16) - 50
- VN-1 8x8 Amphibious Armored Personnel Carrier. *China (all delivered 2015)
- Engesa EE-11 Urutu 6x6 Amphibious Assault APC. *Brazil – (3 EE-11 VCMDM3S1 + 3 EE-11 VRCPM3S2 + 12 EE-11 VTTRM3S7 + 20 EE-11 VTTRM3S6, all to be modernized) - 38

Artillery and anti-aircraft batteries

- SR-5 MLRS. (China)
- Oto Melara M-56 105/14mm towed howitzer. (Italy) - 50
- Thomson-Brandt MO-120 120mm heavy mortar. (France) - 35
- SM4 mortar. (China)
- CAVIM M-66 Cazador mortar (Venezuela)
- Buk-M2EK wheeled air defense missile launcher (Russia) – 10
- Bofors RBS-70 anti-aircraft battery. (Sweden) - 20

Tactical and transport land vehicles

- Land Rover Defender 90HT/110HT. (United Kingdom) – +500
- Ford M151. (United States)
- Chevrolet M-705. (United States)
- AIL M-325 Commandcar (Israel)
- Tiuna (Venezuela)
- Steyr-MAN L-80 series, tactical transport truck (Austria)
- Engesa EE-25, tactical transport truck (Brazil)

Speedboats and launches

- Guardian 22' patrol speedboat. (United States)
- Guardian 25' patrol speedboat. (United States)

Other models in service include Caroní, Manapiare, Caimán, 22 Apure/Apure II assault launches, (all designed and made in Venezuela) and US Coibas.

== See also ==
- Venezuelan Navy
