= Sun Jingliang =

Chinese rocket engine engineer (1930–2022)

- 孙敬良
- Born: 14 July 1930; Ye County, Shandong, China
- Died: 28 December 2022 (aged 92); China
- Education: Harbin Institute of Technology; Zhukovsky Military Aviation Engineering College
- Scientific career
- Fields: Rocket engine
- Workplaces: Science and Technology Commission of Shanghai Space Administration

Chinese name
- Simplified Chinese: 孙敬良
- Traditional Chinese: 孫敬良
Transcriptions
Standard Mandarin
- Hanyu Pinyin: Sūn Jìngliáng

Sun Jingliang (Chinese: 孙敬良; 14 July 1930 – 28 December 2022) was a Chinese rocket engine engineer, and an academician of the Chinese Academy of Engineering.

== Biography ==
Sun was born in Ye County (now Laizhou), Shandong, on 14 July 1930. In 1947, he entered Harbin Institute of Technology, where he majored in aircraft engine. After graduating in March 1950, he became leader of the Translation Team of the Third Aviation School of the People's Liberation Army Air Force in Jinzhou. In September 1950, he was sent to study at Zhukovsky Military Aviation Engineering College on government scholarships, obtaining a vice-doctorate degree in March 1958.

Sun returned to China in March 1958 and that same year became an official in the 3rd Division of the 1st Branch of the 5th Academy of the Ministry of National Defense. In July 1965, he was appointed deputy leader and then leader of the No. 21 Institute of the 2nd Academy of the Ministry of Machinery Industry (later reshuffled as Xinxin Machine Factory). In May 1978, he became deputy chief engineer of the Chief Engineer Office of Shanghai Space Administration (now Shanghai Academy of Spaceflight Technology). In August 1983, he became deputy director of the Science and Technology Commission of Shanghai Space Administration, rising to director in June 1989.

On 28 December 2022, he died at the age of 92.

== Honours and awards ==
- 1985 State Science and Technology Progress Award (Special)
- 1995 Member of the Chinese Academy of Engineering (CAE)
- 1996 State Science and Technology Progress Award (Second Class)
- 1998 Science and Technology Progress Award of the Ho Leung Ho Lee Foundation
