= 33rd Marine Field Artillery Battalion (Venezuela) =

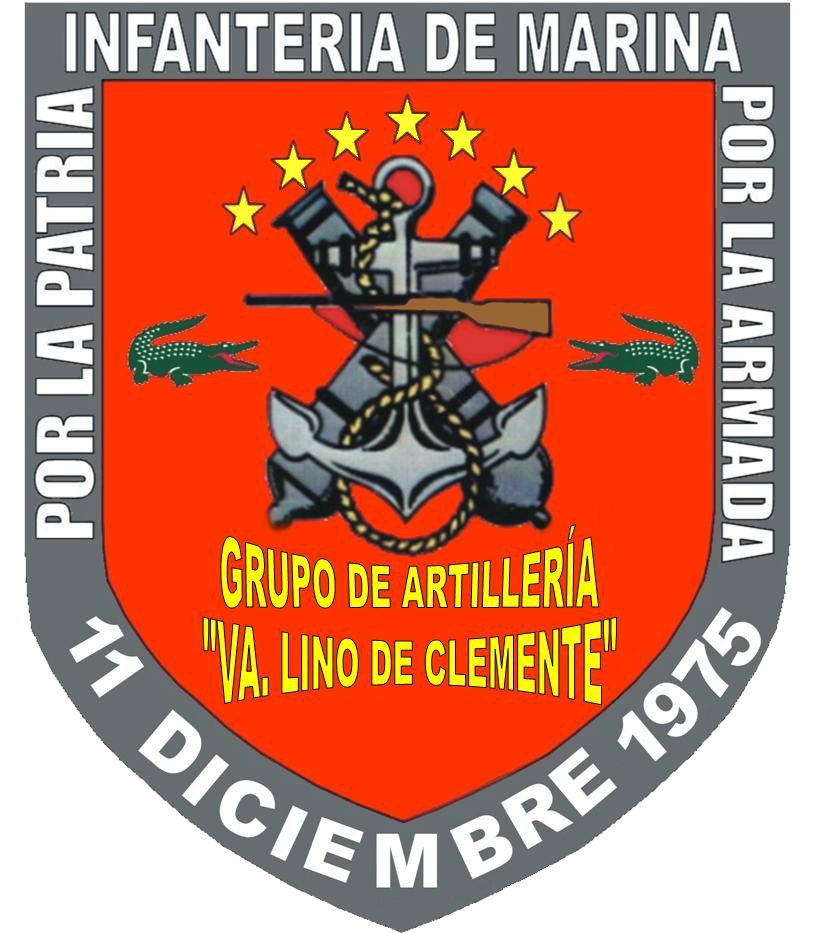
- Active: 11 December 1975–Present
- Country: Venezuela
- Branch: Venezuelan Marine Corps
- Type: Naval Infantry
- Role: Artillery
- Size: Battalion
- Part of: 3rd Marine Brigade
- Patron: Lino de Clemente

The 33rd Marine Field Artillery Battalion is a military unit of the Venezuelan Marine Corps.

== History ==
The battalion was formed on 11 December 1975. It is one of the four artillery units in the Venezuelan Marine Corps. The battalion is equipped with MO-120-RT61 mortars and M-56 Howitzers
