= FB-10 =

Chinese air defence missile system

HQ-13 (Chinese: 飞豹-10) is a mobile short-range air defense missile system developed by the Shanghai Academy of Spaceflight Technology of China Aerospace Science and Technology Corporation (CASC).

The improved variant, called FB-10A, entered the People's Liberation Army Ground Force (PLAGF) service with the designation HQ-13 (Chinese: 红旗-13).

== Development and design ==
The FB-10 was showcased at the Zhuhai Airshow 2012. The FB-10 was described as a spin-stabilized missile with a imaging infrared (IIR) homing seeker.

At the 2016 Zhuhai Airshow, the FB-10 missile was seen mounted on a 6x6 transporter erector launcher (TEL) platform, which additionally mounts a phased array radar, optical sensor, and eight missile tubes. The engagement range is 10 kilometers (6.2 miles), and the engagement altitude is from 15 to 5,000 meters (49 to 16,404 feet). According to Chinese sources, the FB-10 missile is similar to the HQ-10 rolling airframe missile system with infrared/radar dual mode hybrid guidance system.

The FB-10A (PLA designation: HQ-13) missile has a range of 18 km (11 mi), an engagement altitude of 7,500 m (24,600 ft), and a dual-mode guidance system that consists of radio command and imaging infrared (IIR) homing. The radio and IIR guidance allow the missile to be more resistant against countermeasures.

The HQ-13 air defense system is mounted on the common Dongfeng Mengshi chassis. An air defense battery consists of one command vehicle and six launch vehicles. The command vehicle carries an active electronically scanned array (AESA) search radar with 50 km (31 mi) range, while the launch vehicles carries a targeting radar and an electro-optical tracking system. The missile launch vehicle variant carries eight HQ-13 (FB-10A) missiles, while the gun-missile vehicle (SWS3) variant carries a 35mm single-barrel autocannon with two HQ-13 (FB-10A) missiles. The missile systems are supplemented by the OW5-A10 high-energy laser weapon system to form a layered air defense network for People's Liberation Army Ground Force (PLAGF) light combined arms brigades.

== Mounted platforms ==
FB-10 System
FB-10 missile is a type of fire-and-forget air defense missile with an imaging infrared (IIR) guidance system. It can be mounted on a truck.

Mengshi FB-10A Launch System
Air defense vehicle based on the Dongfeng Mengshi 6x6 chassis. The vehicle features a phased array radar, an optical sensor turret, and eight FB-10A missiles.

Mengshi SWS3/LD35L
Air defense gun-missile system mounted on Dongfeng Mengshi 6×6 wheeled chassis. The Aramanets consist of a 35mm single-barrel autocannon and two launchers for FB-10A. The sensor suite onboard includes an electro-optical turret and a phased-array radar. This vehicle is in service with PLAGF's light combined arms brigades.

Type 05 Air Defense Vehicle
Eight HQ-13 missiles mounted on the Type 05 amphibious fighting vehicle chassis. The vehicle features an integrated radar and optics mast for search and tracking.

SWS2/LD35
Air defense vehicle SHORAD gun/missile system based on the VN-1 chassis. Before 2024, it featured a 35 mm cannon and four TY-90 surface-to-air missiles. In 2024, the SWS2 air defense system was updated to use an unmodified VN-1 chassis with a remotely-controlled turret. The turret has the same 35 mm cannon, but the missiles are replaced with six FB-10A.

Type 625E
Air defense vehicle with a 6-barrel 25 mm Gatling gun and eight FB-10A or FN-16 short-range missiles, mounted on an off-road capable 8x8 truck chassis.

== Missile variants ==
FB-10
original variant first displayed in 2016 in a 6x6 truck chassis.

FB-10A
Lightweight variant for improved air mobility, first displayed in 2021 on a new 6x6 Dongfeng Menshi chassis.

HQ-13
Domestic version of the FB-10A missile.

== Operational history ==
In October 2025, the anti-government Rapid Support Forces of Sudan claimed they had shot down a Sudanese military Bayraktar Akinci drone with the FB-10A.

== Operators ==
China

- People's Liberation Army Ground Force: HQ-13

Sudan

- Rapid Support Forces: FB-10A transferred from Chad.

Chad

- Chadian National Army: FB-10A purchased and provided by United Arab Emirates

== Specifications (FB-10A) ==
- launch mode: Oblique servo hot launch
- guidance: Radio command + imaging infrared (IIR) homing seeker
- minimum range: 1 km (0.62 mi)
- maximum range: 18 km (11 mi)
- minimum altitude: 20 m (66 ft)
- maximum altitude: 7,500 m (24,600 ft)
- single-shot kill probability: >80% against aircraft targets; >70% against missile targets
- radar range: 50 km
- radar azimuth: 0º - 360º
- radar elevation: 0º - 45º
- engagement on the move: Yes

== See also ==
- LY-70
- IRIS-T SL
