= ZBD-03 =

Chinese infantry fighting vehicle

ZBD-03 Type 03 IFV
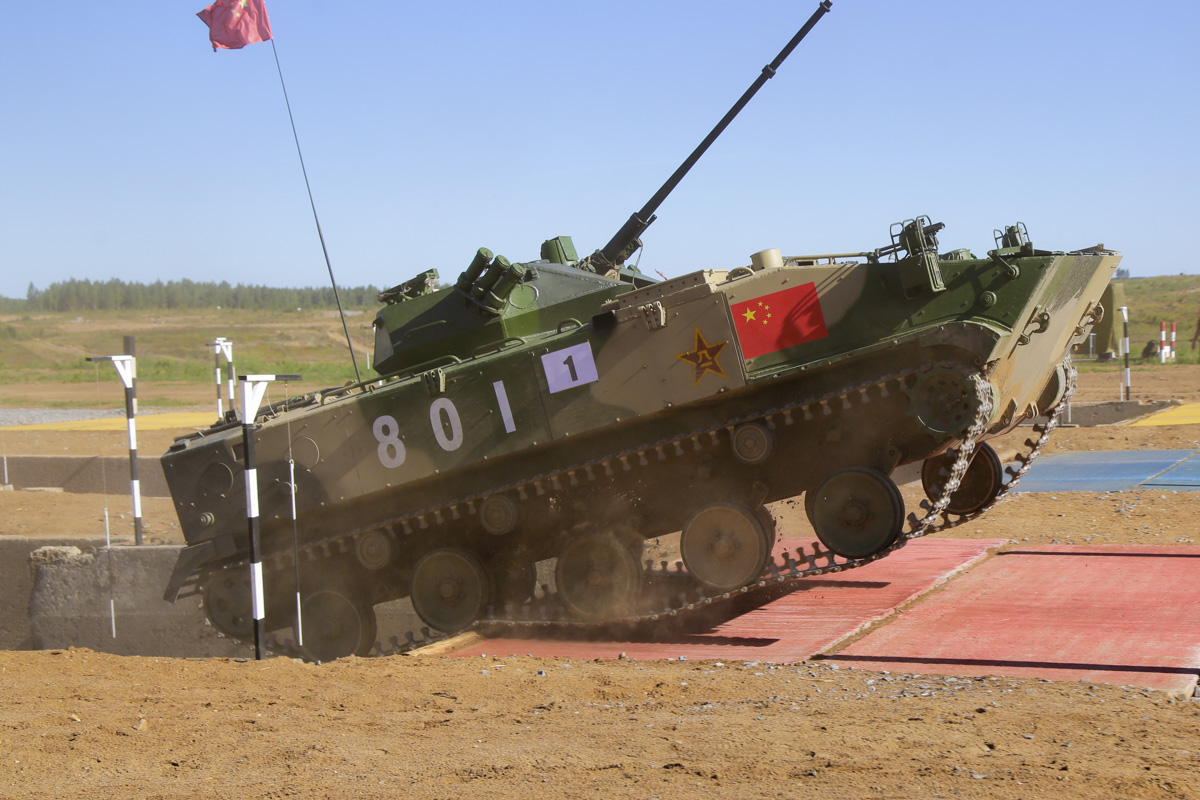
- ZBD-03 at Airborne Platoon 2018, part of the International Army Games
- Type: Infantry fighting vehicle
- Place of origin: China

Service history
- In service: 2002–present

Production history
- Designed: 1998
- Produced: 2000–present
- Variants: ZBD-03; ZBD-03 Command Post; ZBD-03 ATGMS

Specifications
- Mass: 8 t (8.8 short tons; 7.9 long tons)
- Length: 5.6 m (18 ft 4 in)
- Width: 2.6 m (8 ft 6 in)
- Height: 2.2 m (7 ft 3 in)
- Crew: 3
- Passengers: 5
- Armor: Welded steel protects against small arms and shell splinters. Aluminium alloy body.
- Main armament: 30 mm autocannon
- Secondary armament: 7.62 mm coaxial machine gun 1 x HJ-73C anti-tank missiles
- Engine: Dongfeng diesel 210hp or 350 hp
- Suspension: Hydropneumatic suspension
- Operational range: 500 km (310 mi) to 600 km (370 mi)
- Maximum speed: ZBD-03: 68 km/h (42 mph) (land); 6 km/h (3.7 mph; 3.2 kn) (water)

The ZBD-03 or Type 03 (industrial designation WZ506) is a Chinese airborne infantry fighting vehicle. It features a light-weight chassis and hydropneumatic suspension for airborne operations. Early prototypes received the designation ZLC-2000.

== Development ==
The ZBD-03 was designed to replace the BMD-3 and was in service as part of the People's Liberation Army Air Force. The vehicle was designed to be air-dropped from medium-sized aircraft such as the Xi'an Y-20 if necessary. Available variants include the infantry fighting vehicle (IFV), armored recovery vehicle (ARV), and anti-tank guided missiles (ATGMs).

== Design ==
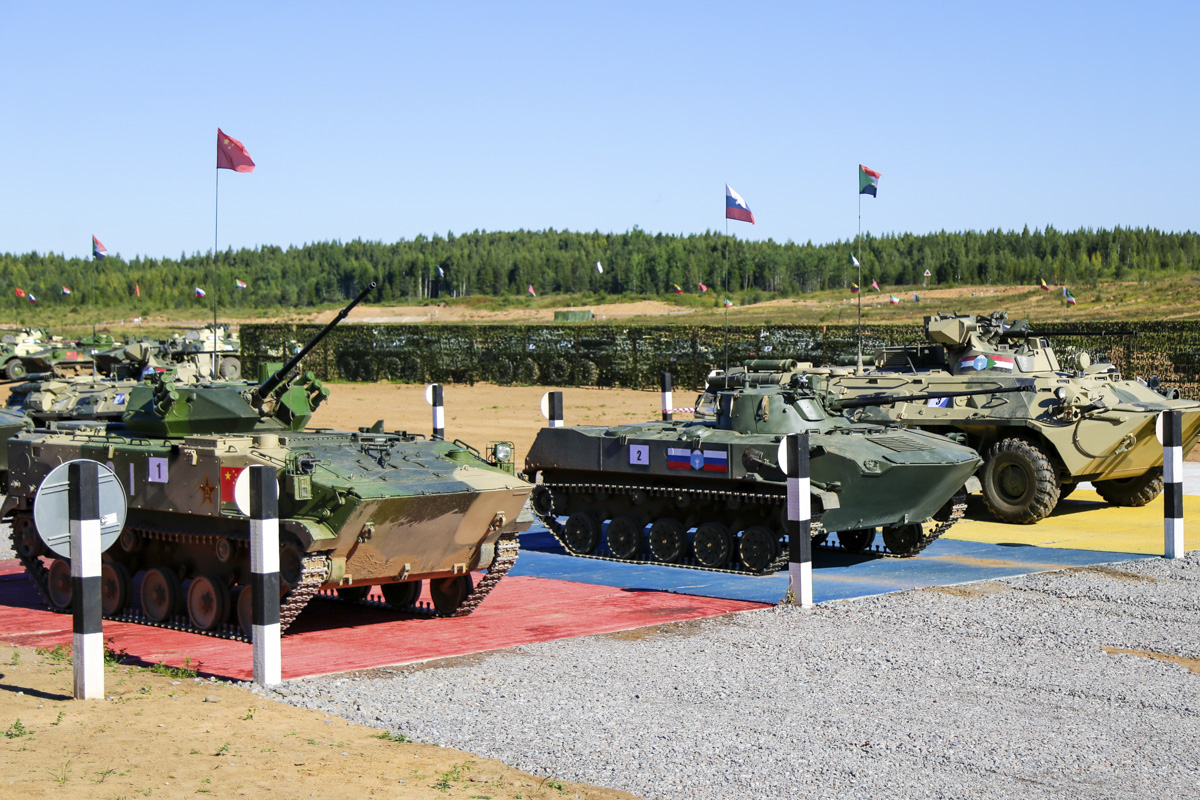
Type 03 (left) is lighter yet larger than BMD-2.

The ZBD-03 features indigenously designed chassis and internal subsystems, which possess a distinctive layout different from Russian designs. However, some part of the vehicle might contain Russian technologies used on BMD-3.

=== Mobility ===
The vehicle can be airdropped from Y-20 transport aircraft. The vehicle also retains the Russian parachute system for airdrop operations from the Il-76. ZBD-03's relatively narrow width allows the vehicle to be transported by a Y-8 tactical transport aircraft.

The suspension system of ZBD-03 consists of five lightweight road wheels and three return rollers with a front-mounted drive sprocket. The integrated hydropneumatic suspension has variable ground clearance. Tracks are retracted before airdropping, thus minimizing the force of impact during the landing operation. The ZBD-03 is fully amphibious. The vehicle is propelled by its tracks in the water.

The vehicle is powered by a Dongfeng diesel engine, developing 210 hp or 350 hp. The maximum road speed is 72 km/h, while the maximum speed on water is 6 km/h.

=== Armament ===
The ZBD-03 is equipped with a single-man turret with a dual-axis stabilized ZPT-99A 30mm autocannon capable of firing high-explosive incendiary (HEI), high explosive tracer (HE-T), armor-piercing (AP), and armour-piercing discarding sabot (APDS) ammunition. A missile rail launcher at the top of the turret is included as part of the HJ-73C anti-tank guided missile (ATGM) system. HJ-73C is a type of SACLOS guided missile capable of engaging armored vehicles, stationary bunkers, and helicopters. The vehicle has a total of four rounds of HJ-73 available. Secondary weaponry includes a coaxial 7.62mm machine gun and three smoke grenade dischargers mounted to each side of the turret.

=== Fire control ===
The ZBD-03 features a computerized fire control system. The gunner has access to day/night thermal optics, laser rangefinder, and digital ballistic computer. The driver and commander have their own observation instruments installed on the hatch. Although the autocannon on the ZBD-03 is stabilized, the gunner thermal sight lacks stabilization, thus limiting the accuracy while moving. The mid-life upgrade of ZBD-03 that was unveiled in 2021 features a new fire control system with the capability of firing on the move. The new stabilized thermal optics and electro-optical sensors are mounted at the base of the autocannon. The thermal images are connected to the internal displays attended by the gunner and commander.

=== Protection ===
The ZBD-03 has a crew of three (a commander, a driver, and a gunner) and can carry five infantry passengers in a troop compartment. The gunner is seated in the single-man turret located in the middle of the chassis. The driver and commander are located in tandem to the left of the power compartment in the front right of the chassis. The troop compartment is located in the rear with two overhead hatches and a rear exit.

The ZBD-03 armor protection is limited by the weight restrictions necessary for air dropping. With a combat weight of 8 tonnes, the vehicle's armor is thin and sloped to maximize resistance to small caliber weapons. The vehicle hull is made of welded aluminum alloy, with a thin layer of applique armor mounted on the side of the vehicle body. The armor is rated to defend against 12.7mm machine gun rounds in the front and 7.62mm rifle rounds from the side. The turret construction is welded steel, which could provide better protection.

== Variants ==
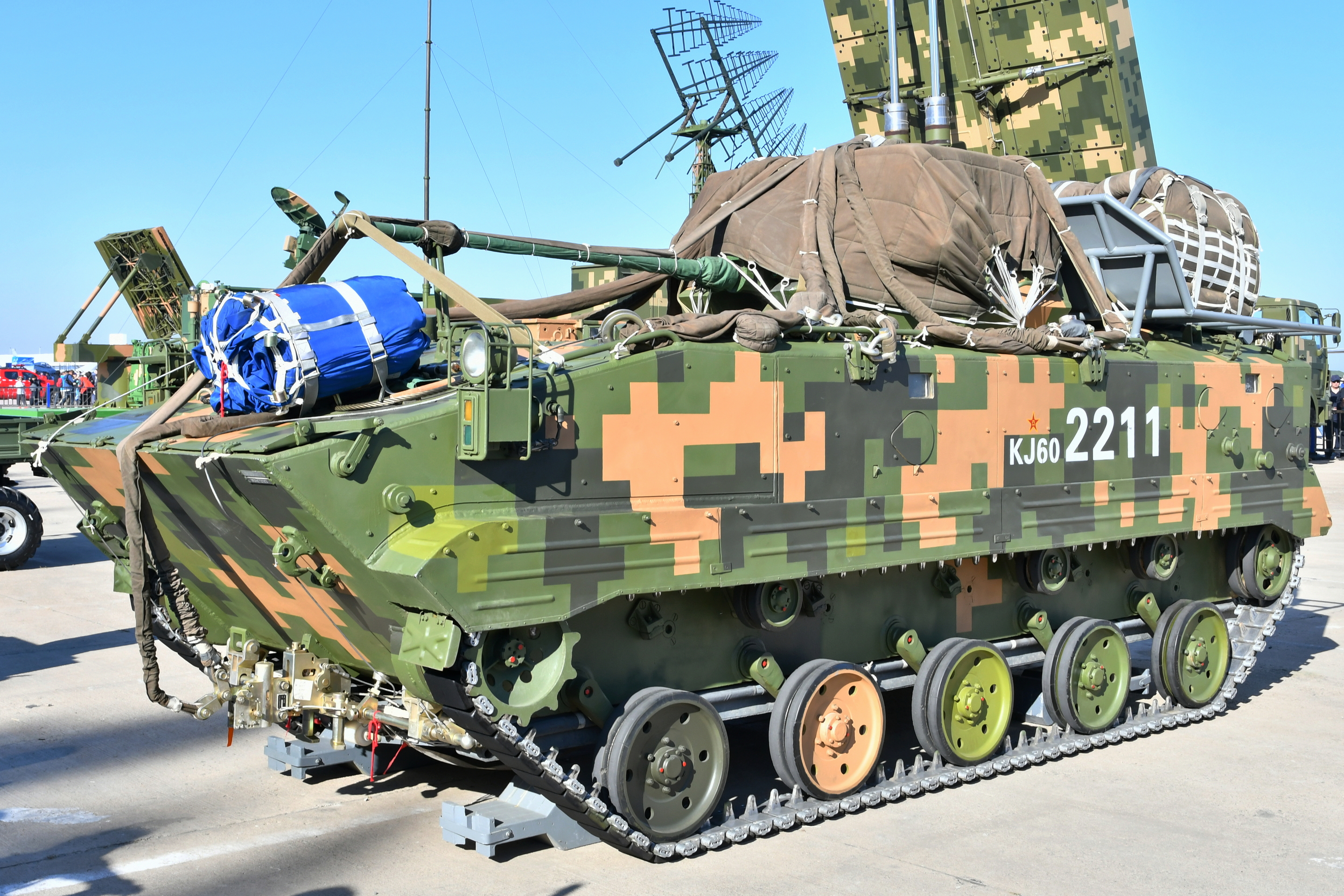
ZBD-03 in air-drop configuration

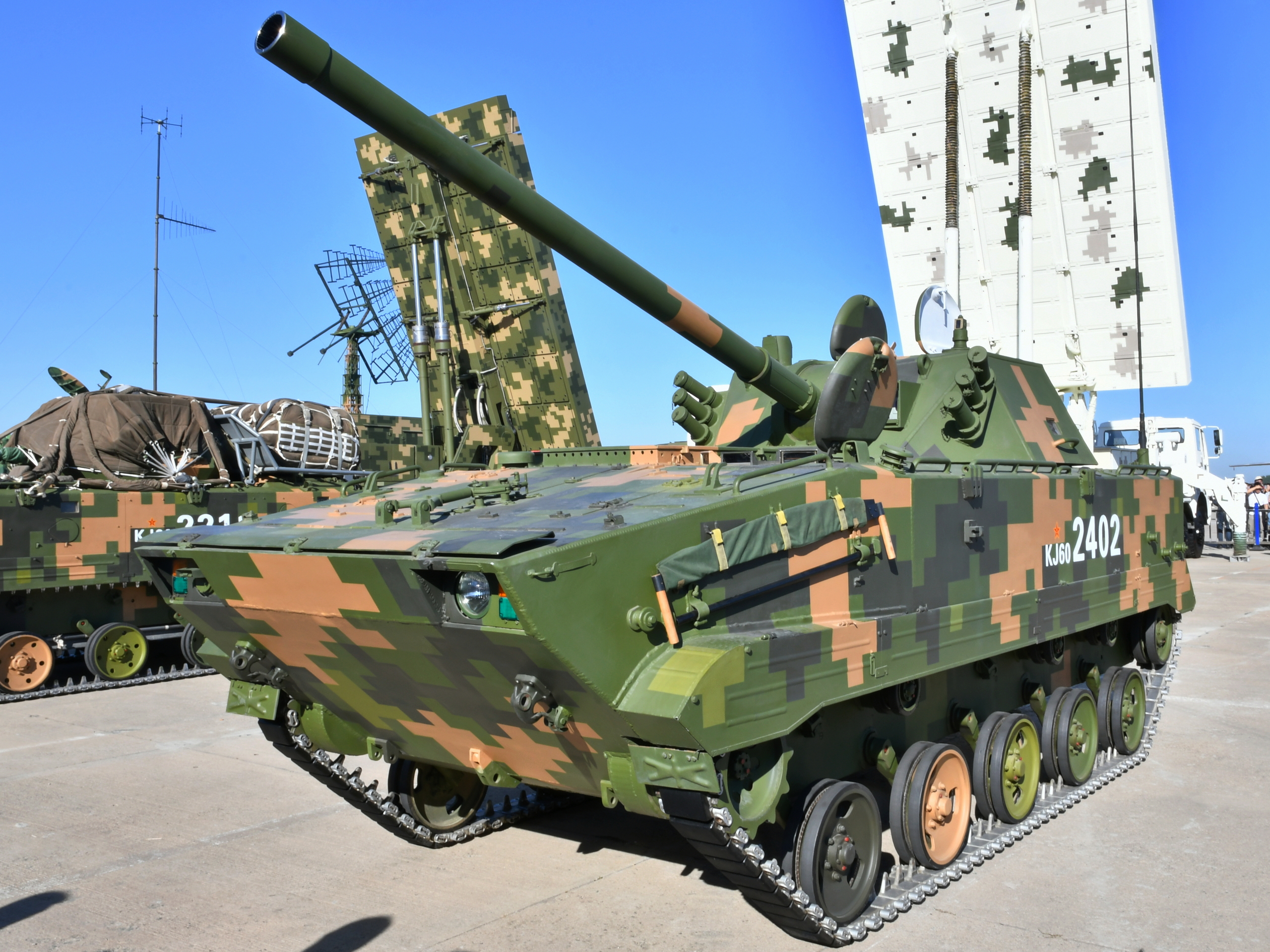
ZBD-03 based gun-mortar vehicle

ZBD-03 based ammunition carrier

ZLC-2000
Designation for ZBD-03 prototype.
ZBD-03
Standard variant.
ZBD-03 Upgrade (2018)
Second generation ZBD-03, featuring a new chassis with six wheels and a turret derived from ZBD-04, and is similar to the configuration of BMD-4. The weight is increased to 15 tonnes to support the new turret, and the vehicle is designed to be airdropped by Xian Y-20. Unveiled at Zhuhai Airshow 2018.
ZBD-03 Upgrade (2021)
A mid-life upgrade for the original ZBD-03 was unveiled in 2021. The upgrade kit includes a new communication system and antenna, new stabilized thermal optics, and new electro-optical sensor.
ZBD-03 Command Post
The command and control version features a higher rear hull to accommodate staff.
ZBD-03 Self-Propelled Gun-Mortar
Self-Propelled Gun-Mortar variant based on ZBD-03 chassis. Armed with 120mm gun-mortar similar to the ones mounted on PLL-05.
ZBD-03 ATGM Carrier
Armed with the HJ-8 ATGM anti-tank guided missile.
ZBD-03 Armored Cargo Vehicle
Carrying ammunition and other battlefield supplies.

== Operators ==
China

- People's Liberation Army Air Force
  - People's Liberation Army Air Force Airborne Corps - 400+ units as of 2026. 180 units of ZBD-03; Uncounted units of other variants.

== Gallery ==
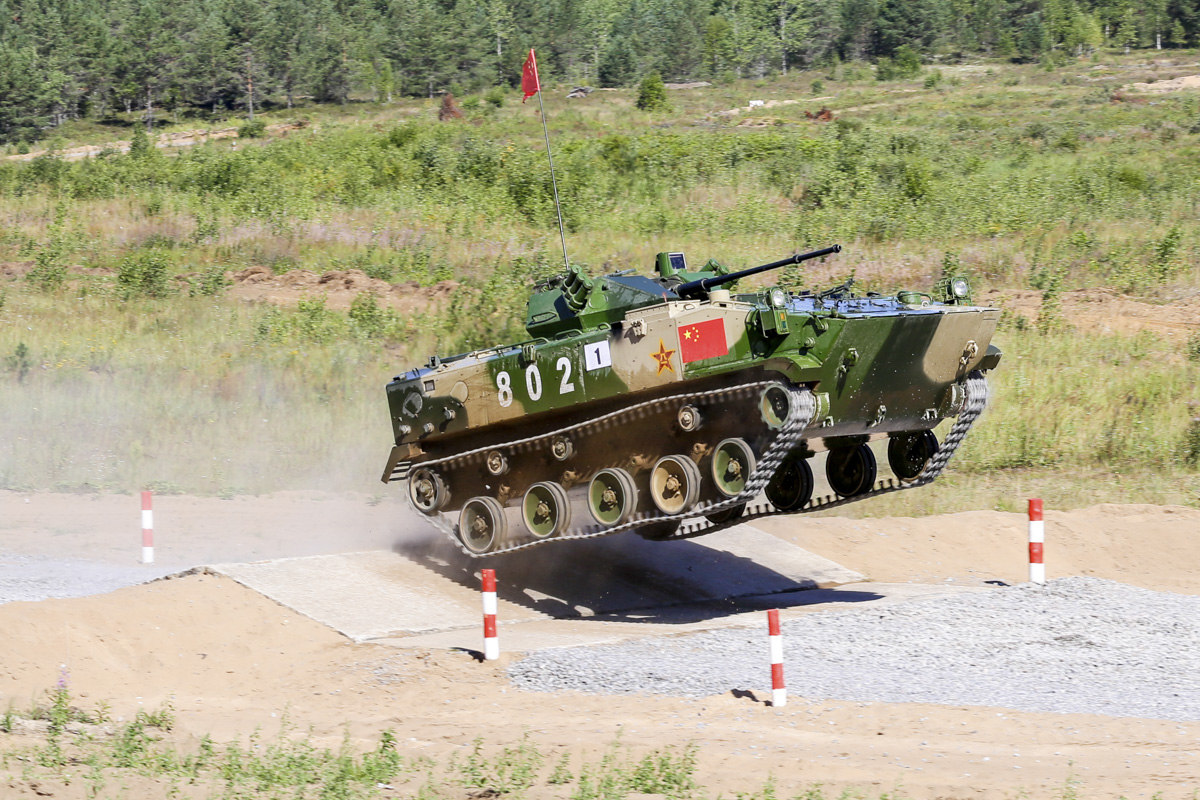
ZBD-03 showing maneuverability at Airborne Platoon 2018

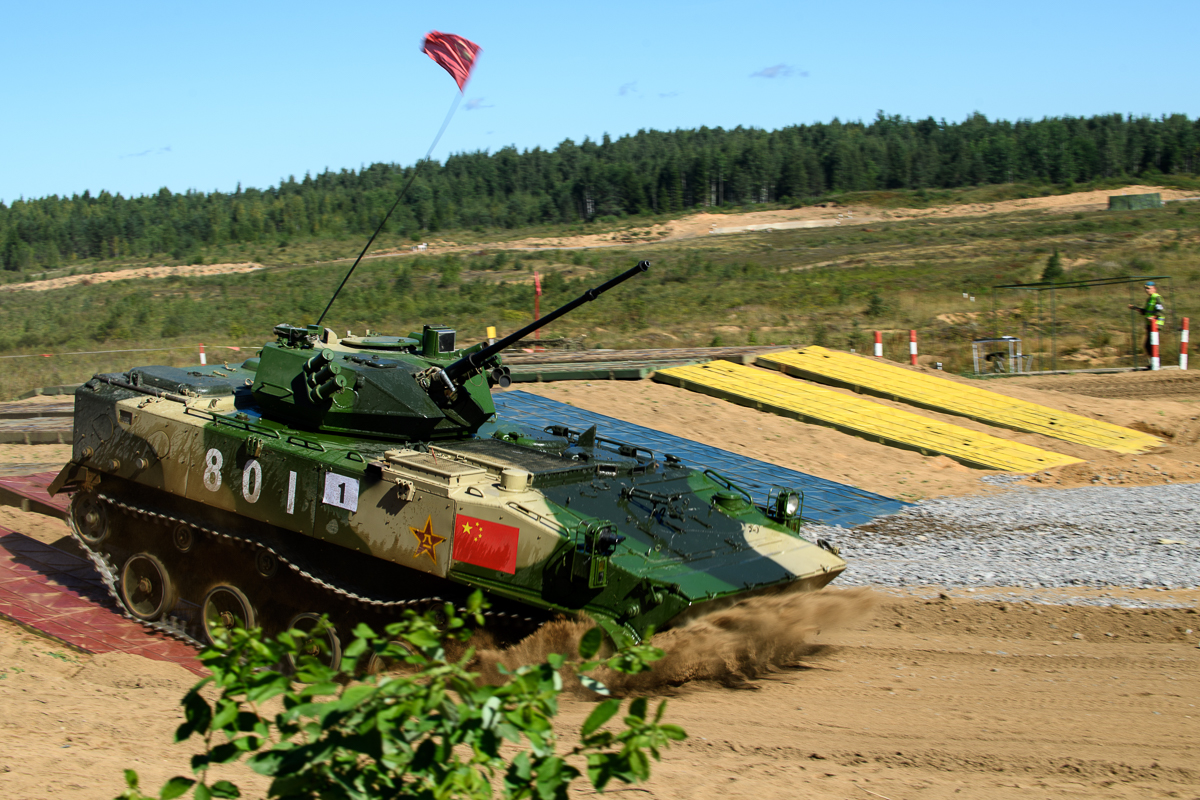
ZBD-03 traversing over obstacle

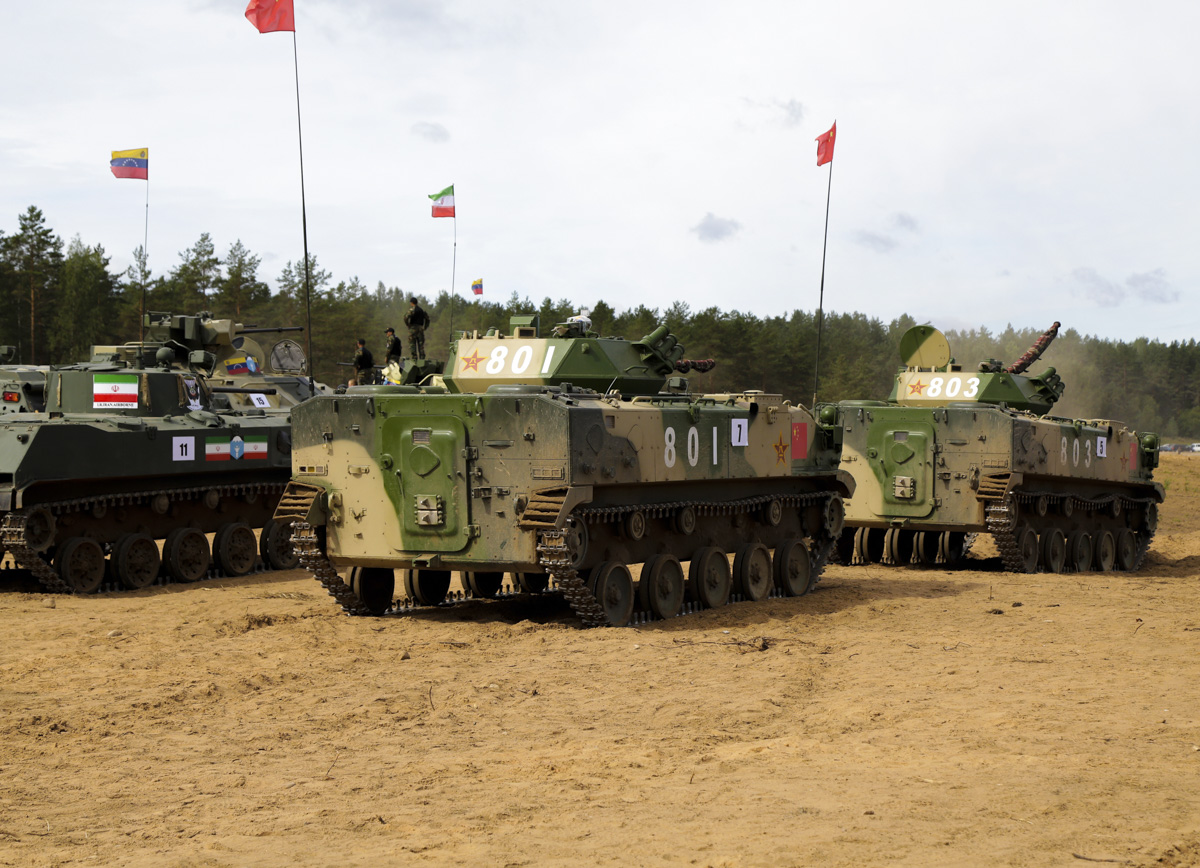
rear side of ZBD-03

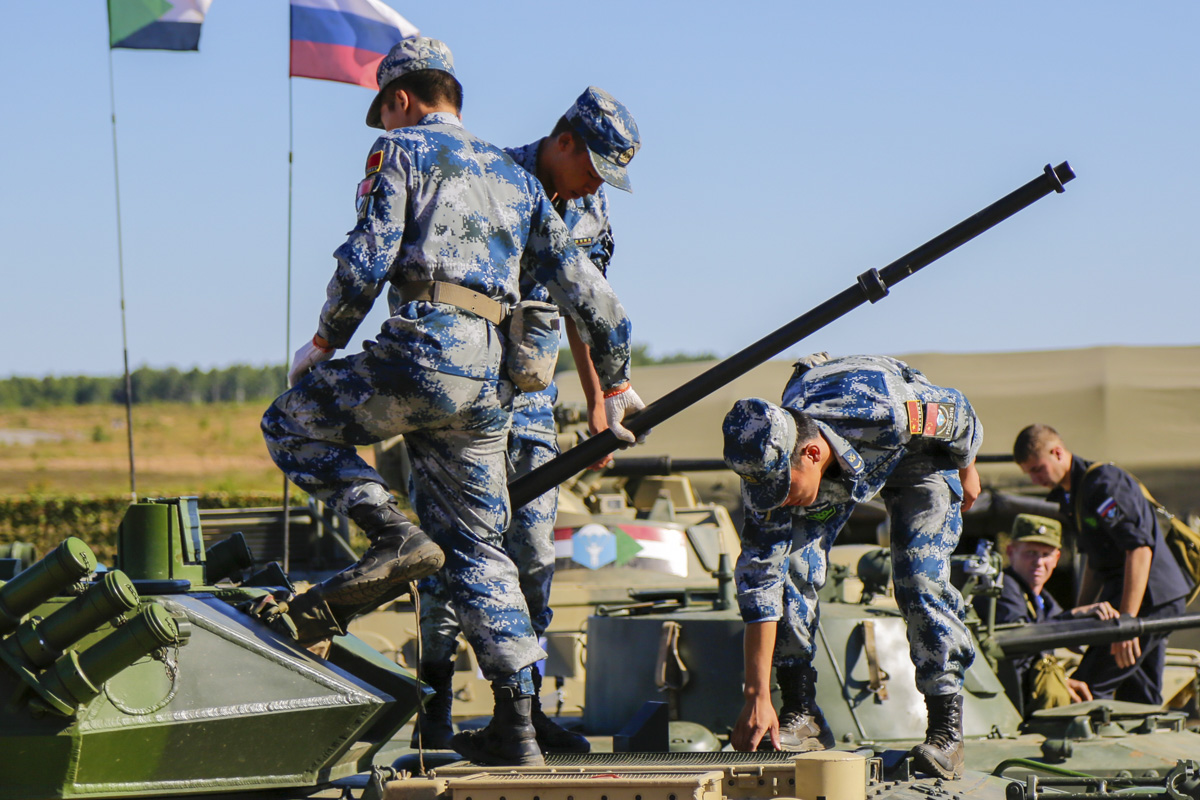
Airborne Infantry checking the 30 mm autocannon

== See also ==
- List of modern armored fighting vehicles

Related development

- ZBD-04 - tracked infantry fighting vehicle developed by China
- ZBD-05 - amphibious fighting vehicle developed by China
- ZBL-08 - wheeled infantry fighting vehicle developed by China

Similar ground systems

- BTR-D – (Soviet Union)
- BMD-4 – (Russia)
