= LY-70 =

Chinese air defence missile system

LY-70 (Chinese: 猎鹰-70) is a medium-range air defense missile system developed by the Shanghai Academy of Spaceflight Technology (SAST) of China Aerospace Science and Technology Corporation (CASC). The system consists of a truck-based chassis with an unmanned turret mounted, which includes two types of air defense missiles, an active electronically scanned array (AESA) radar, and an electro-optical fire control system. The system was displayed at the Zhuhai Airshow 2021.

The primary armament is the LY-70 medium-range missiles with a range of 2–38 km (1.2–23.6 mi), and a hybrid guidance of strap-down inertial guidance, datalink, and active radar homing. The secondary armament is the FB-10A short-range infrared missile with a range of 1.5–18 km (0.93–11.18 mi). The system is fitted with eight LY-70 missiles in two sets of four, and six FB-10 missiles in two sets of three.

The system has a short deployment time of 5 minutes and can detect a target at a range of 70 kilometers.

The LY-70 system is designed to intercept targets between 15 and 18 kilometers in maximum altitude and between 1 and 40 kilometers in range.

== See also ==
- SPYDER
- SLAMRAAM
- IRIS-T SLM
