= Type 05 amphibious fighting vehicle =

Chinese amphibious fighting vehicle

Type 05 Amphibious Fighting Vehicle ZBD-05 / ZTD-05
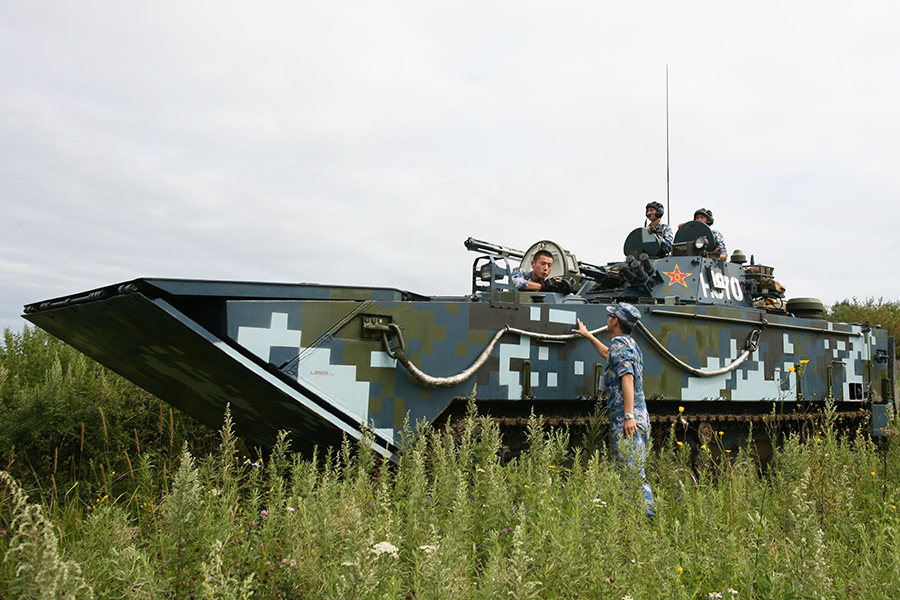
- ZBD-05 infantry fighting vehicle
- Type: Amphibious fighting vehicle
- Place of origin: China

Service history
- In service: 2005–present
- Used by: See Operators

Production history
- Designer: Chen Pengfei (Norinco)
- Designed: 2000–2004
- Manufacturer: Norinco
- Produced: 2005–present

Specifications
- Mass: 26.5 t (29.2 short tons; 26.1 long tons)
- Length: Hull length: 9.5 m (31 ft 2 in); Bow extended: 13.24 m (43 ft 5 in)
- Width: 3.36 m (11 ft 0 in)
- Height: 3.04 m (10 ft 0 in)
- Crew: 3 (IFV), 4 (Light Tank)
- Passengers: 8
- Armor: Welded aluminum alloy and steel construction with composite armor plates
- Main armament: ZPT-99 cannon turret ZPL-98A 105mm rifled gun
- Secondary armament: HJ-73C anti-tank missile QJC-88 anti-aircraft machine gun QJT-88 coaxial machine gun
- Engine: diesel 550 hp (land), 1475 hp (water)
- Suspension: Hydropneumatic suspension, retractable suspension units
- Operational range: 500 km (310 mi)
- Maximum speed: 65 km/h (40 mph) on land 28–30 km/h (15–16 kn) (ZBD-05) on water

The Type 05 amphibious armored vehicle (Chinese: 05式两栖装甲车) is a family of amphibious tracked armored fighting vehicles developed by Norinco for the People's Liberation Army Navy Marine Corps, consisting of two main combat variants — the ZBD-05 infantry fighting vehicle and the ZTD-05 assault vehicle, as well as several support variants based on the ZBD-05. The Type 05s could be launched at sea from an amphibious assault ship over the horizon, and feature a hydroplane, a design concept that has been compared to the cancelled United States Expeditionary Fighting Vehicle (EFV) program.

As one of the world's fastest amphibious combat vehicles, the Type 05 offers a high water speed (HWS) capability that supports rapid landing operations.

== Development ==
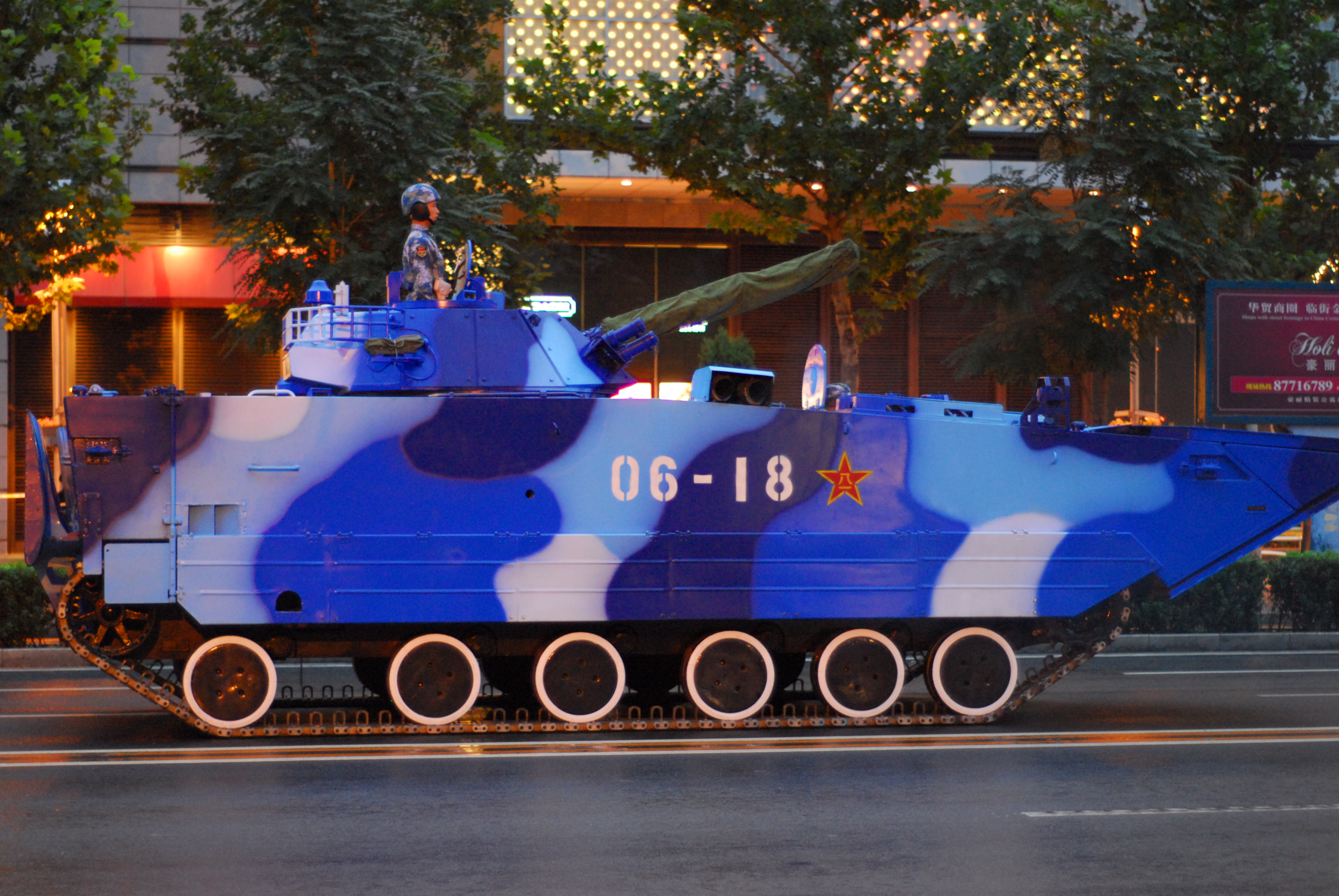
A ZBD-05 in Beijing, practicing for China's 60th Anniversary military parade in 2009.

The Chinese military studied Normandy landings and Pacific War and deemed that both high water speed (HWS) capability and organic firepower are essential for successful landing operations. Then the People's Liberation Army (PLA) tasked China North Industries Group Corporation (Norinco) and China State Shipbuilding Corporation to develop a family of amphibious vehicles that can perform cross-sea landing operations, which was named the Project 212. The project was led by chief designer Chen Pengfei (Chinese: 陈鹏飞).

During the development, Chinese engineers encountered the vicious cycle of the power-to-weight ratio, as high engine output requires a heavier engine that leads to a heavier vehicle. To resolve the issue, the design team designed a planing hull with retractable tracks, water jet propulsion, buoyancy-inducing materials, aluminum alloy chassis, and dynamically adjustable trim vane and stern flaps that can automatically change to optimal angles to generate lift and reduce drag.

The Project 212 amphibious infantry fighting vehicle was able to achieve water speed at 28 km/h (15 kn), which is a considerable improvement over a similar type of vehicle like AAV7A1 amphibious assault vehicle (AAV). The United States's cancellation of Expeditionary Fighting Vehicle (EFV) leaves China the only country to produce a vehicle with such a unique concept. AAV's replacement, the Amphibious Combat Vehicle also lacks high water speed (HWS) capability.

The Project 212 was certified as Type 05. The whole project was developed between 2001 and 2004, with the first production vehicle completed in 2005. Two variants of the vehicle family were developed first, the infantry fighting variant ZBD-05 and the assault gun/light tank variant ZTD-05. ZBD-05 vehicles were showcased in the military parades of 2009 and 2015. The ZTD-05 assault vehicle variant also replaced the obsolete Type 63A amphibious tank introduced in the late 1990s. Research and development effort is reflected in the capable design. The vehicle implies that China is determined to secure advanced amphibious assault capabilities.

== Design ==
=== Mobility ===
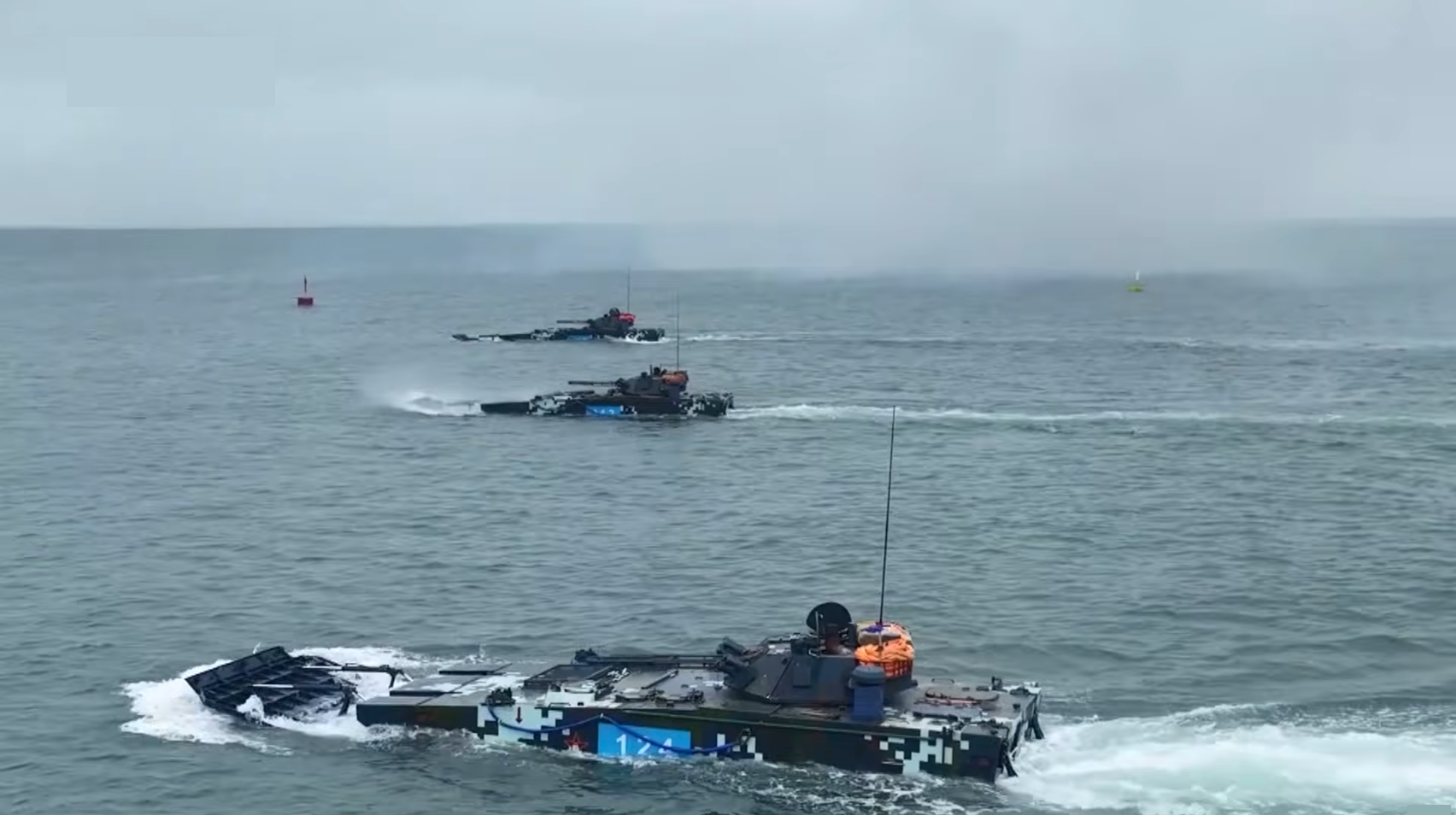
PLANMC ZBD-05 propelled by water jets

The Type 05 features a flat hull, an extendable bow, an extendable rear flap, six retractable road wheels on each side, and front/rear rollers. The vehicle's design results in significantly reduced drag. The bow-mounted trim vane and the rear flap adaptively change their angles according to the current displacement speedometer so that fluid resistance can always be kept at the lowest, optimal level. The automatic control system ensures simplified operation.

The ZBD-05 is fully amphibious, propelled by two large water jets mounted to the rear side of the hull. In the water, the engine is able to generate 1475 horsepower, and it can switch to land mode with only 550 horsepower. The vehicle can run at a maximum road speed of 65 km/h and 30 km/h in the water. It has a maximum cruising range of 500 km and can negotiate a gradient of 60 % and a side slope of 30%. It can cross a vertical obstacle of 0.7 m and a trench of 2m.

=== Armament ===
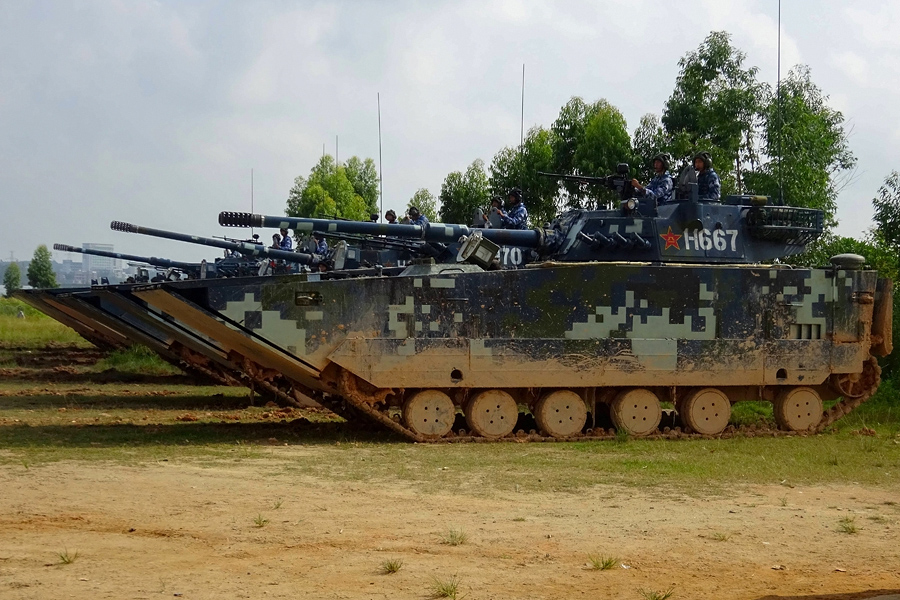
ZTD-05 assaults vehicle armed with 105mm rifled gun seen at Joint Sea-2016 military exercises

The Infantry Fighting Vehicle (IFV) variant, ZBD-05, is built to support infantry and amphibious operations. The 3-man crew consists of the driver positioned front-left of the turret, with commander and gunner occupying the turret. The vehicle features a ZPT-99 30mm cannon turret with a HJ-73C ATGM rail launcher, capable of penetrating more than 800mm RHA after ERA. The vehicle can carry 7 to 8 (one squad) armed infantry in its passenger compartment at the rear.

The Assault Vehicle (light tank) variant, ZTD-05, is armed with a fully stabilized ZPL-98A 105mm rifled gun. The ZTD-05 assault vehicle variant has a crew of four, including a loader. The type of APFSDS round fitted on ZTD-05 is the DTC02-105 armor piercing fin stabilized discarding sabot based on BTA-2 105mm APFSDS, capable of penetrating 600mm RHA at 2,000 meters. The rifled gun is also capable of launching laser guided beam-riding missile. The gun is loaded manually with a fire rate of 6 to 8 rounds per minute with 36 rounds ammo reserve. ZTD-05's turret shares a similar layout to the ZTL-11 assault vehicle.

Secondary weapons for both variants include a Type 86 7.62mm coaxial-mounted machine gun. ZTD-15 features a QJC-88 12.7mm anti-aircraft machine gun mounted on the roof of the turret near the loader.

=== Fire control ===
Accuracy and precision are attained by a computerized fire-control system (FCS) on both ZBD-05 and ZTD-05. The fire control system includes a fire-control ballistic computer, laser rangefinder, two-plane stabilization, and daylight/infrared gunner sight with a passive night vision channel. Commander has access to day/night independent thermal sight with hunter-killer (commander override) capability.

Type 05 is fitted with a battle management system, a command and control system, and a digital map interface. All the necessary information is displayed on screens to the driver, commander, and gunner. ZTD-05 is equipped with laser designator for beam-riding SACLOS applications, and loader position is also fitted with an independent periscope.

=== Protection ===
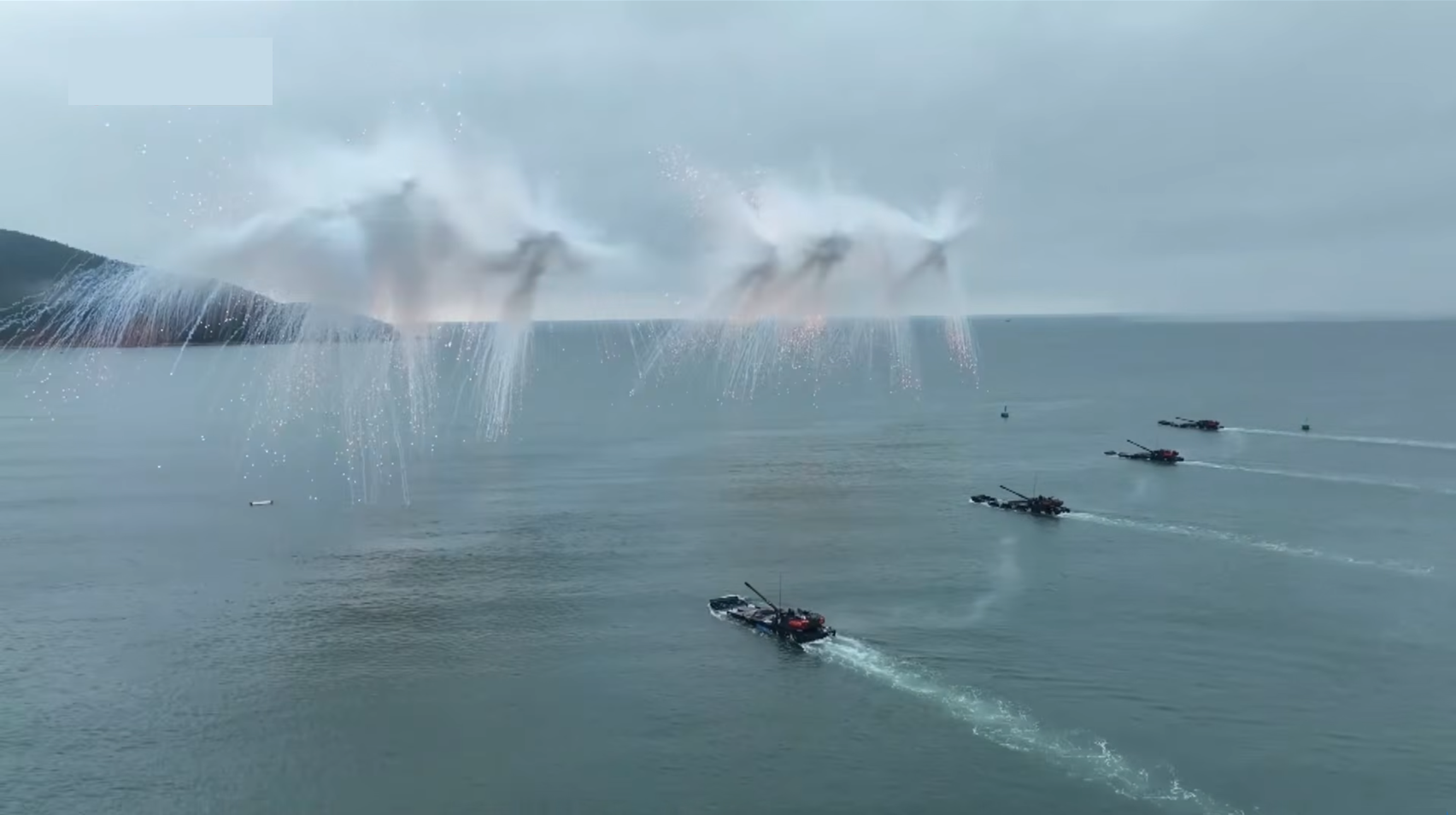
ZTD-05 assault vehicle releasing countermeasures

The vehicle has satellite navigation, a fire suppression system, an NBC protection system, and day/night thermal vision, ensuring a high degree of survivability for the crew. The hull is constructed with an aluminum alloy chassis with additional steel glacis plates. Aluminum alloy reduces weight and provides protection against small arms rounds and shell splatter, while the steel plates can stop 12.7mm rounds. The turret is constructed of all-welded steel armor with composite plates, which gives all-around protection against 12.7mm rounds and shell splinters. The front face of the turret is claimed to stop 25mm AP rounds at 1,000 metres (3,300 ft). The upper part of the suspension is protected by armor plates.

Both ZBD-05 and ZTD-05 are fitted with laser warning receivers, which are connected to 2 sets of 4-barrel smoke grenade launchers. The storage area around the aft section double as slat armor.

== Deployment ==
Type 05 amphibious fighting vehicles are deployed by People's Liberation Army Ground Force amphibious assault brigades and People's Liberation Army Navy Marine Corps.

== Variants ==
Type 05 (ZTD-05 or ZLT-05) Amphibious Assault Vehicle (Chinese: ZTD-05两栖突击车)
The assault gun variant, armed with a ZPL98A 105mm low-recoil rifled gun, a 7.62mm coaxial machine gun, and QJC-88 12.7mm anti-aircraft machine gun. An improved variant, designated ZLT-05A, with upgraded computer system and digital terminals accessible for driver, gunner, and commander.
Type 05 (ZBD-05) Amphibious Infantry Fighting Vehicle (Chinese: ZBD-05两栖步兵战车)
The infantry fighting vehicle variant, armed with a ZPT-99 30mm autocannon, a 7.62mm coaxial machine gun, and HJ-73C anti-tank missiles.
Type 05 (ZSD-05) Amphibious Armored personnel carrier (Chinese: ZSD-05两栖装甲人员输送车)
The armored personnel carrier variant, armed with plate-protected 12.7mm heavy machine gun turret.
Type 05 Amphibious Armored Reconnaissance Vehicle (Chinese: 05式两栖装甲侦察车)
The Armoured reconnaissance variant, equipped with telescopic mast with electro-optical and infrared (EO/IR) system, a laser-range finder, and an X-band radar. The variant has 12.7 mm heavy machine gun turret for defense.
Type 05 Amphibious Armored Command Vehicle (Chinese: 05式两栖装甲指挥车)
The mobile command and control variant, equipped with field communication and battle management system.
Type 05 Amphibious Armored Recovery Vehicle (Chinese: 05式两栖装甲抢救车)
The armoured recovery vehicle variant, equipped with a crane, hydraulic winch for emergency vehicle recovery. Additional handrail is installed on the top for ease of operation in the water.
Type 05 (GSL132) Assault Breach Vehicle (Chinese: 05式两栖装甲破障车)
The mine clearance assaults vehicle variants. It is equipped with mine plow, mine detection device, Clear Lane Marking system, 8 tube obstacle clearing rockets, and rocket-projected mine clearing line charge (MICLIC).
Type 05 Amphibious Armored Ambulance (Chinese: 05式两栖装甲救护车)
Armored ambulance variant based on Type 05 command vehicle chassis, providing frontline medical support and evacuation. The armored ambulance features emergency ventilator, air conditioning, monitoring, and shock-absorbing double bunk beds.
Type 05 Air Defense Vehicle
The air defense variant. Eight HQ-13 missiles mounted on the Type 05 amphibious chassis. The vehicle also features an integrated radar and optics mast for search and tracking.
Type 05 Anti-Tank Guided Missile Carrier
A Type 05 variant carrying eight HJ-10 anti-tank guided missiles (ATGM). The turret consists of 12 missile cartridges and a stabilized electro-optical mast for firing on the move at sea.
VN16
Modified export variants of the ZTD-05.
VN18
Modified export variants of the ZBD-05.
VS25
Modified export variants of the Type 05 Amphibious Armored Recovery Vehicle.

== Operators ==
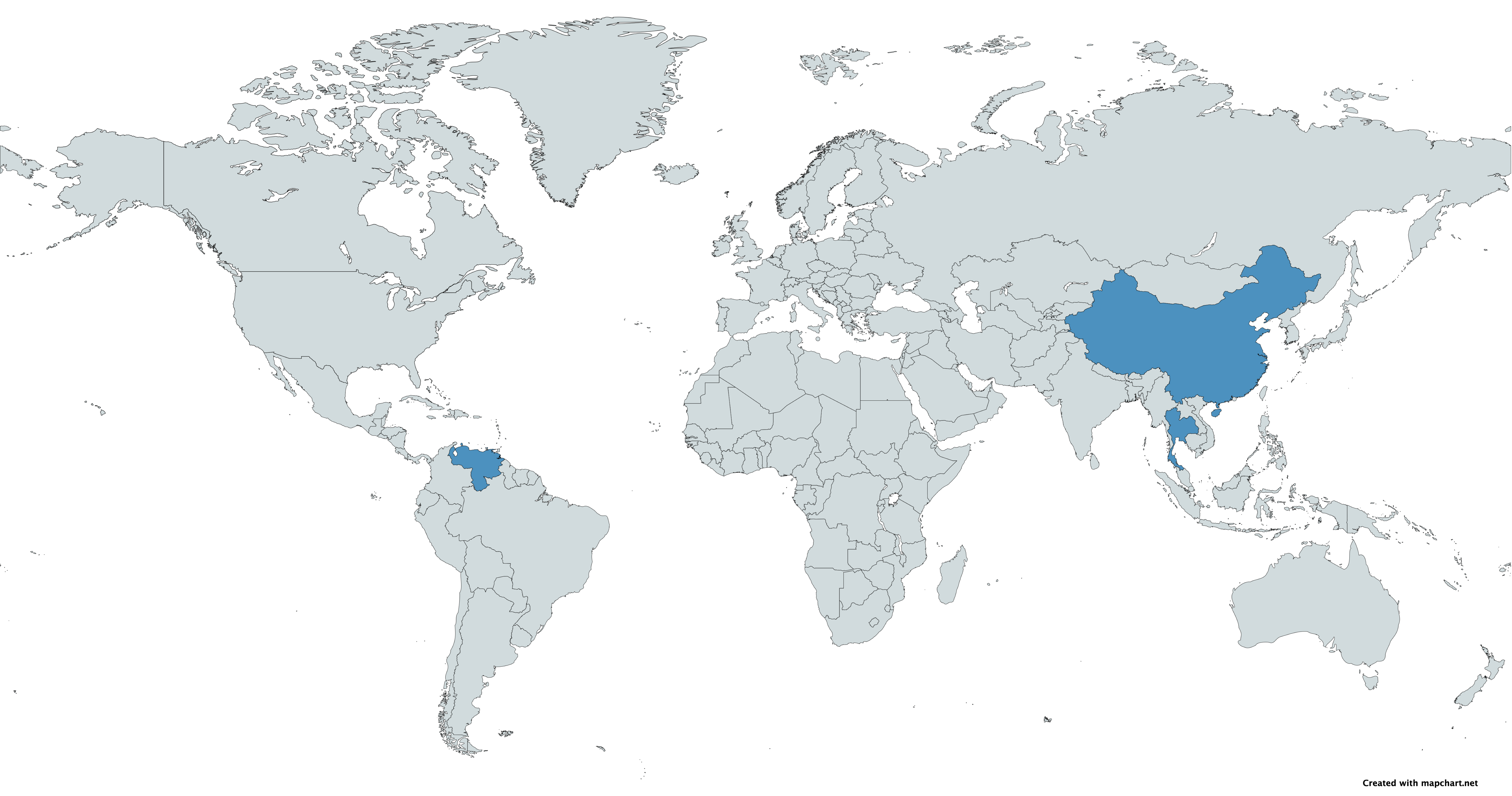
A map with nations who operate the Type 05 in blue

- China
  - People's Liberation Army Ground Force: 1,500+ units in service as of 2022. 750 units of ZBD-05; 750 units of ZTD-05; Uncounted units of other variants.
  - People's Liberation Army Navy Marine Corps: 500+ units in service as of 2021. 375 units of ZBD-05; 125 units of ZTD-05; Uncounted units of other variants.
- Venezuela: Adopted the VN16, VN18, and VS25 for the Venezuelan Marine Corps.
- Thailand: 3 ordered in June 2020 at approximate cost of US$13 million for the Royal Thai Marine Corps and delivered in May 2021.

== See also ==
- List of modern armored fighting vehicles

Related development

- ZBD-03 - airborne combat vehicle developed by China
- ZBD-04 - tracked infantry fighting vehicle developed by China
- ZBL-08 - wheeled amphibious infantry fighting vehicle developed by China

Comparable ground systems

- Expeditionary Fighting Vehicle – (United States)
- Assault Amphibious Vehicle – (United States)
- Amphibious Combat Vehicle – (United States)
- BMP-3 – (Soviet Union, Russia)
- BMP-2 – (Soviet Union)
