= Type 08 =

Chinese amphibious wheeled armoured fighting vehicle family

Type 08 vehicle family
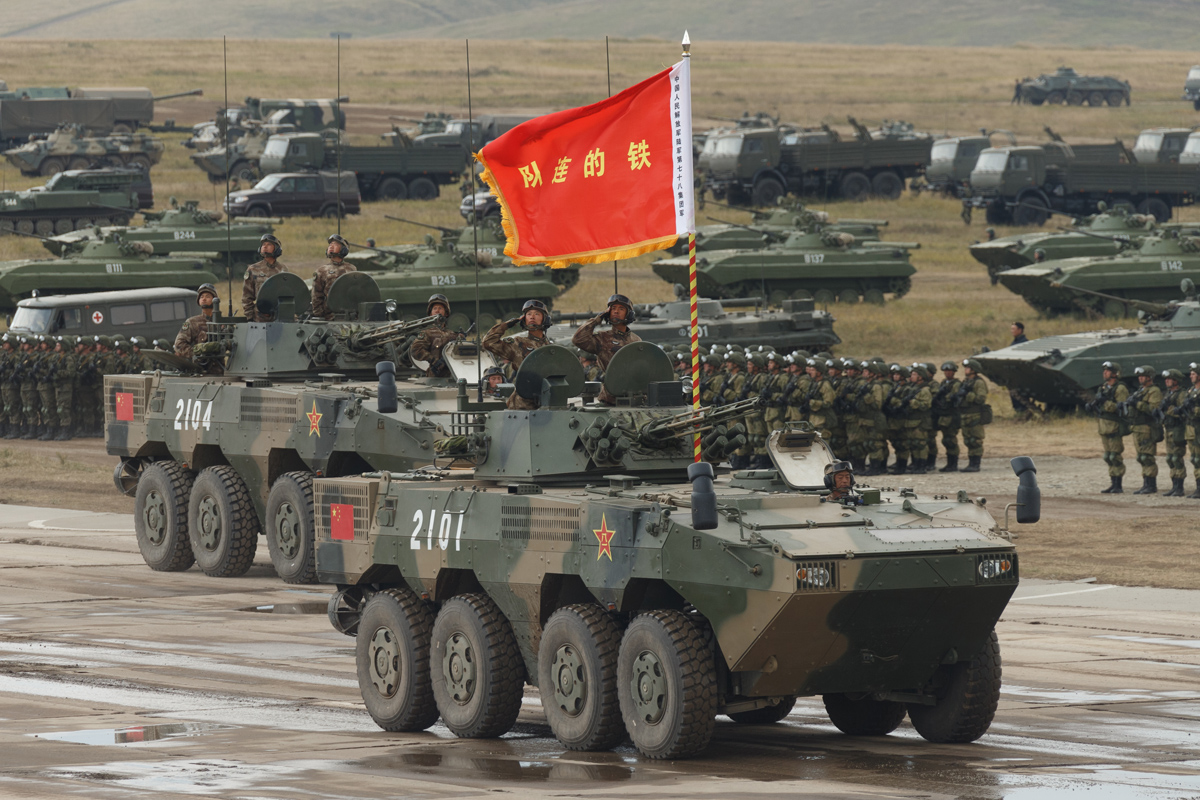
- ZBL-08 infantry fighting vehicle
- Type: Armoured fighting vehicle
- Place of origin: People's Republic of China

Service history
- In service: 2008–present
- Used by: See Operators
- Wars: Boko Haram insurgency

Production history
- Designer: Norinco
- Manufacturer: Norinco
- Produced: 2006–present
- No. built: 6,150+

Specifications
- Mass: Varies by configuration 15–25 t (15–25 long tons; 17–28 short tons); 21 t (21 long tons; 23 short tons) (ZBL-08); 23 t (23 long tons; 25 short tons) (ZTL-11); 25 t (25 long tons; 28 short tons) (PLL-09)
- Length: 8 m (26 ft)
- Width: 3 m (9.8 ft)
- Height: 2.1 m (6 ft 11 in) (without turret)
- Crew: 3
- Passengers: 11 (APC); 7 (IFV)
- Main armament: ZPL-98A 105 mm gun (ZTL-11); QJC-88 12.7 mm gun (ZSL-10); ZPT-99 30 mm cannon (ZBL-08); KDG 35 mm revolver autocannon (PGL-12); PL-96 122 mm howitzer (PLL-09); PL-01 155 mm howitzer (PLL-09)
- Secondary armament: HJ-73C Anti-Tank Guided Missile; Type 86 7.62 mm machine gun QJT 5.8 mm machine gun
- Engine: Deutz BF6M1015C diesel 11.9 L (2.6 imp gal; 3.1 US gal); 330 kW (440 hp)
- Transmission: semi-automatic
- Suspension: 8×8 wheeled
- Operational range: 800 km (500 mi)
- Maximum speed: 100 km/h (62 mph)

The Type 08 (Chinese: 08式轮式装甲车族; pinyin: Líng bā Shì lúnshì zhuāngjiǎchē zú; lit. 'Type 08 wheeled armored vehicle family') is a Chinese family of modern eight-wheeled, amphibious, modular armored vehicles developed by Norinco for infantry fire support, battlefield logistics, and quick reaction operations. Developed in the early 2000s, the vehicle family were produced for more than 6,000 hulls and widely deployed by the People's Liberation Army Ground Force and People's Liberation Army Marine Corps.

ZBL-08 is the designation for the infantry fighting vehicle (IFV) variant in the Type 08 vehicle family. The modular design offers a plethora of different configurations, including an armored personnel carrier (APC) variant, an assault gun variant, combat engineering variants, mine clearance variants, CBRN defense variants, 122 mm/155 mm self propelled howitzer (SPH) variants, air defense variants, self-propelled mortar variants, reconnaissance vehicle variants, command vehicle variants, and much more.

== Development ==
The development of the Type 08 vehicle family starts in the 1990s as the successor to other aging Chinese wheeled vehicles. Type 08 was first seen in 2006, undergoing road tests.

In 2025, an improved version of Type 08 chassis was showcased in the 2025 China Victory Day Parade. The new version has a larger trim vane, additional armor, and pontoon boxes visible on the lower font plate.

== Design ==
=== Overview ===
The Type 08 has modular design that allows customization of the vehicle based on mission. The vehicle consists of six modules: engine module, transmission module, control module, suspension module, hull module, and weapon station module. The vehicle is fitted with a digital battlefield management system, satellite navigation system, NBC protection, and automatic fire suppression system. It is able to datalink and communicate with other vehicles as well as the command posts.

=== Protection ===
The vehicle chassis and turret is made of all-welded steel with mounted alumina ceramic composite plates, providing protection against shell splinters, 12.7 mm armor-piercing incendiary rounds at 100 metres (330 ft) and 25 mm projectiles over the frontal arc at 1,000 metres (3,300 ft). The vehicle is fitted with smoke dischargers and laser warning receivers to improve survivability. The vehicle is capable of all weather operation. The driver is equipped with a helmet-mounted night vision system fed from the CCD-based sensors fitted on the vehicle chassis.

=== Armaments ===
ZPT-99 on the Type 08 infantry fighting vehicle

ZBL-08 infantry fighting vehicle, the standard variant of the Type 08 family, is equipped with ZPT-99 30 mm autocannon and Type 86 7.62 mm coaxial machine gun. Two HJ-73C ATGM rail launchers are mounted on both sides of the turret. The gunner is equipped with a computerized fire control system, gun stabilization with automatic tracking, laser rangefinder, and thermal imagining devices.

ZSL-10 armored personnel carrier is equipped with an open-top armor-protected QJC-88 heavy machine gun and smoke discargers.

ZTL-11 assault vehicle is fitted with ZPL-98A 105 mm rifled gun with capability of launching armor piercing fin stabilized discarding sabot (APFSDS), high explosive (HE), and high-explosive anti-tank (HEAT) ammunitions, as well as the indigenous GP105 105 mm gun-fired laser beam riding guided anti-tank missile (ATGM). Secondary weapons include QJT-88 5.8 mm coaxial machine gun and QJC-88 12.7 mm roof-mounted heavy machine gun. The turret of ZTL-11 is derived from the Type 05 amphibious tank, but with more smoke dischargers. The assault vehicle is also fitted with ST-16 millimeter wave radar suite, similar to the one mounted on Type 99A tank. The radar is designed for target identification (IFF), acquisition, and tracking.

=== Mobility ===
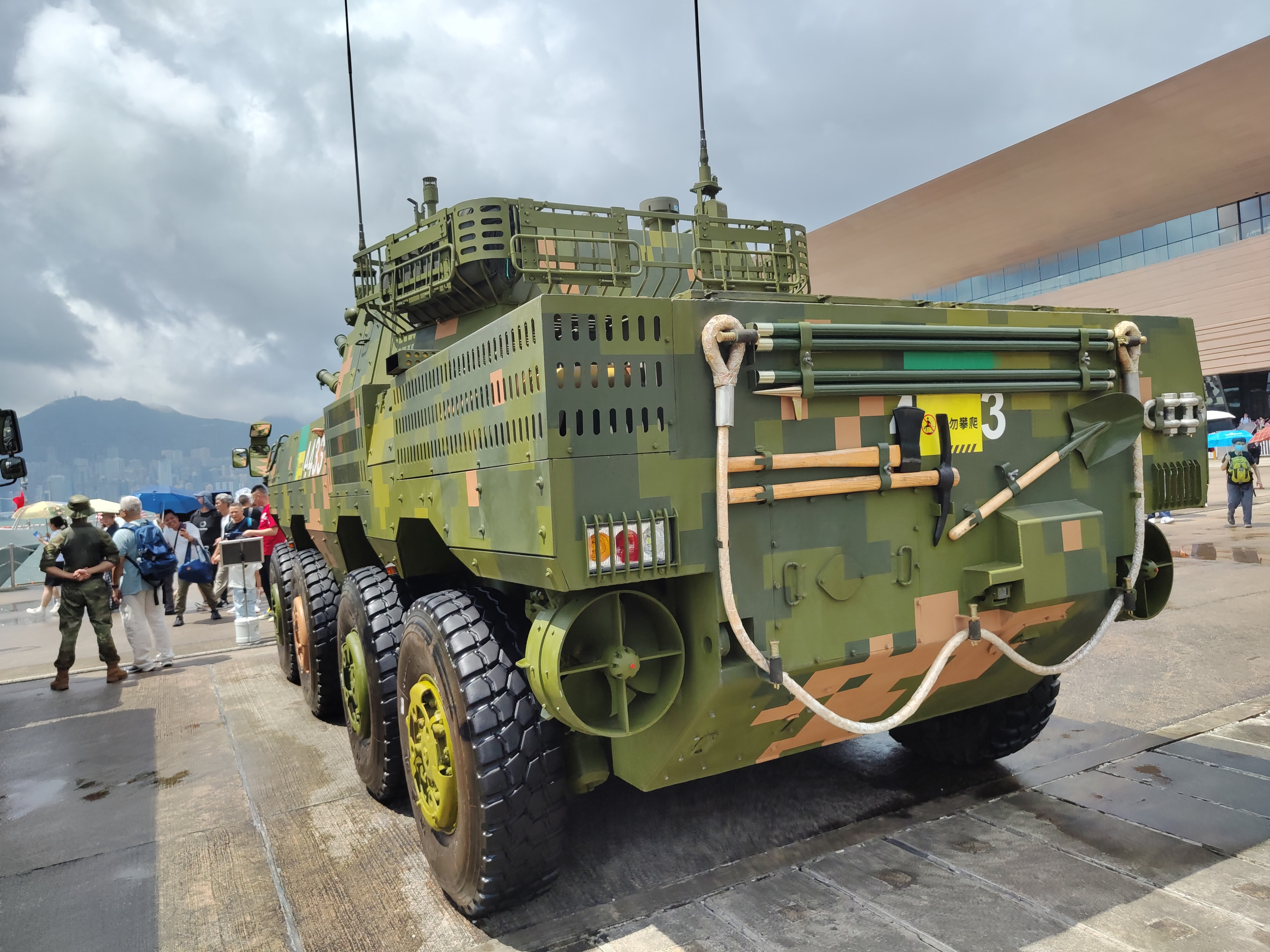
Water jets on the Type 11 assault gun

Type 08 family is powered by the Deutz BF6M1015C water-cooled V-type 6-cylinder diesel engine, developing 330 kW (440 hp). The vehicle is equipped with automated manual transmission. The front four wheels are capable of power steering. The maximum speed is 100 km/h (62 mph) with an 800 km (500 mi) range on paved roads. The vehicle is fully amphibious, with hydraulically controlled water jets mounted to the rear. The vehicle is fitted with computer-controlled central tire inflation system and steel-reinforced radial tires to improve mobility under off-road and emergency situation.

== Operational history ==
=== Cambodian–Thai border crisis ===
The VN-1 was used in the 2025 Cambodian–Thai border crisis. Despite some alleged criticism on the Norinco vehicles during the crisis, Thailand continued to purchase VN-1 and other Norinco armored vehicles in 2026.

== Variants ==
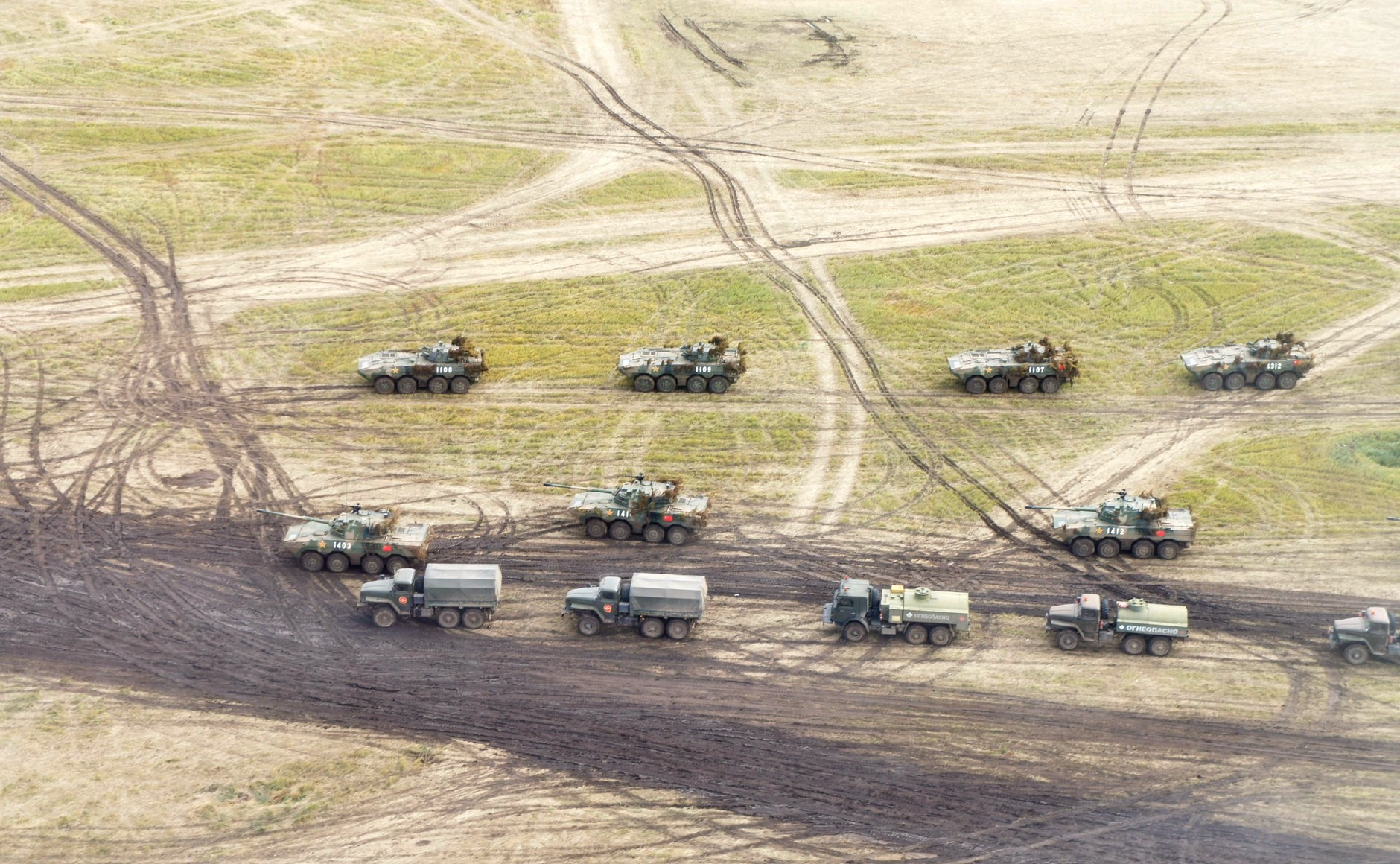
Type 08 APC and Type 11 assault gun during the Vostok 2018 military exercises

ZBL-08 (Type 08) infantry fighting vehicle
Original IFV variant with a ZPT-99 30 mm turret based on Shipunov 2A72. It features a crew cabin in the back for infantry transportation. HJ-73C missiles can be optionally mounted on each side of the turret.
ZSL-10 (Type 10) armoured personnel carrier
Based on IFV variant but the modified crew cabin has a higher ceiling. The armored personnel carrier can be armed either with a manually controlled, armour-plate-protected 12.7 machine gun or a remote-controlled weapon station. The APC is equipped with ten specialized shock-absorbing seats for additional comfort and protection against land mines and improvised explosive device (IED).
Type 08 armored reconnaissance vehicle
Armed with a 30 mm turret, the vehicle has a chassis that is similar to the IFV variant. The Armored Reconnaissance Vehicle will advance before IFVs and assault guns for intelligence gathering. On-board high definition electro-optical cameras, thermal imaging systems, and laser designator can transmit battlefield and target information for other data-linked vehicles for target identification and designation. The Armored Reconnaissance Vehicle can provide better situational awareness for the infantry. The main radar and electro-optical sight is mounted on a retractable mast and is capable of data-link and image-sharing with other vehicles. Aerial reconnaissance capabilities are provided with various unmanned aerial vehicles. All reconnaissance vehicles are equipped with a launch rail behind the turret, capable of launching ASN-15 with 10 kilometres (6.2 mi) range and one hour endurance. BZK UAV can also be stored and assembled on the spot if longer-range aerial reconnaissance is needed. In addition, individual scouts are equipped with hand-launched remote-controlled SUAV similar to RQ-11 Raven.
Type 08 artillery reconnaissance vehicle
The vehicle chassis is based on the APC variant and armed with 12.7 mm machine gun and HJ-73C anti-tank missile. The artillery reconnaissance vehicles does not perform combat reconnaissance missions, instead focusing on target acquisition for artillery battalions, and collection of terrain and meteorological data through various observation instruments.
Type 08 electro-optical reconnaissance vehicle
The vehicle chassis is based on the APC variant but with no turret and self-defense weapons. The prominent addition, compared to other reconnaissance variants, is a rapid-spinning electro-optical surveillance camera that creates a 360-degree panoramic video stream. The onboard sensor may include a daylight camera, an infrared-thermal camera, and a night vision camera.
PLL-09 (Type 09) modular self-propelled howitzer system
Based on IFV variant. Can be armed with either a 122 mm or 155 mm howitzer, to provide indirect fire support for infantry.

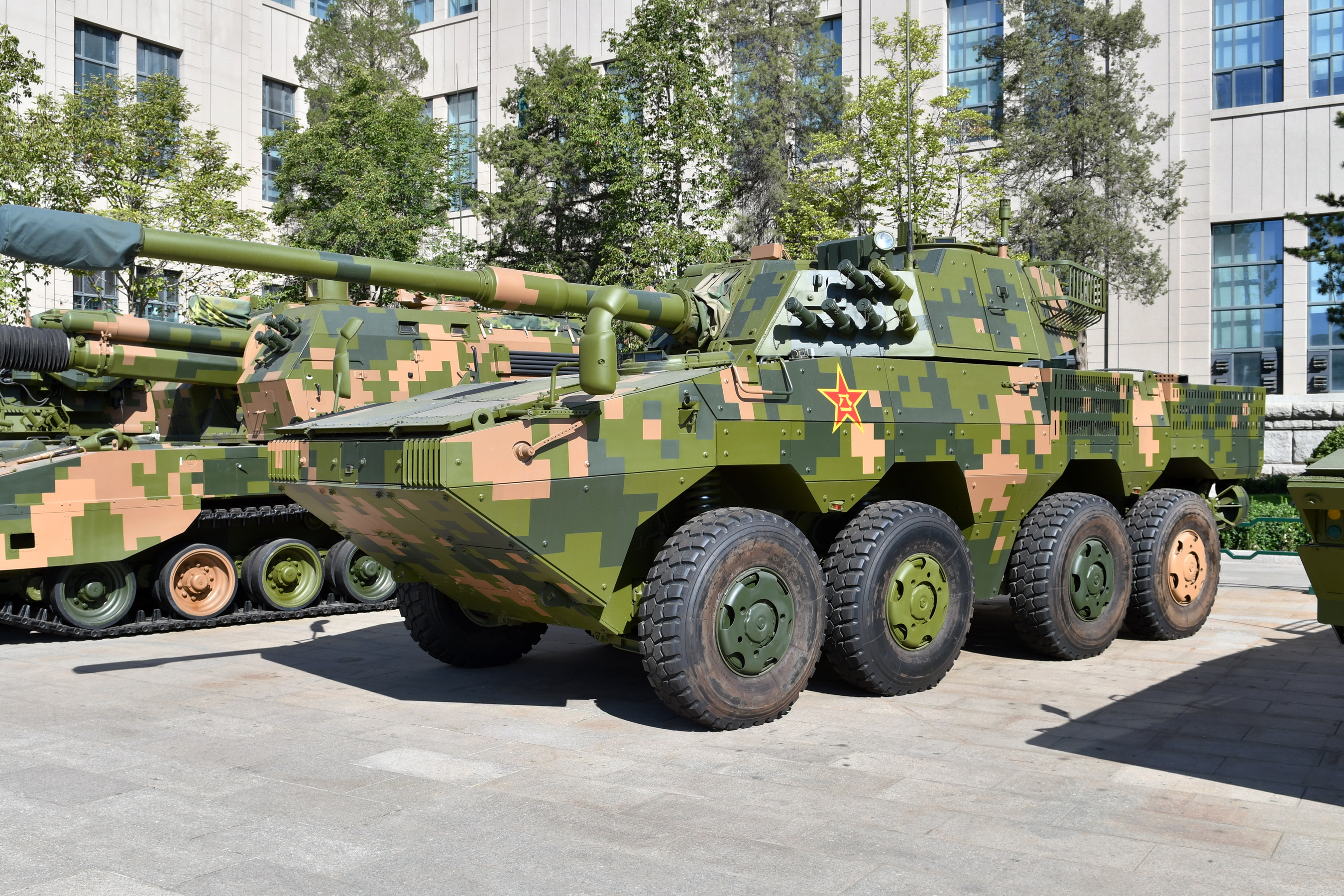
Type 11 Assault Gun

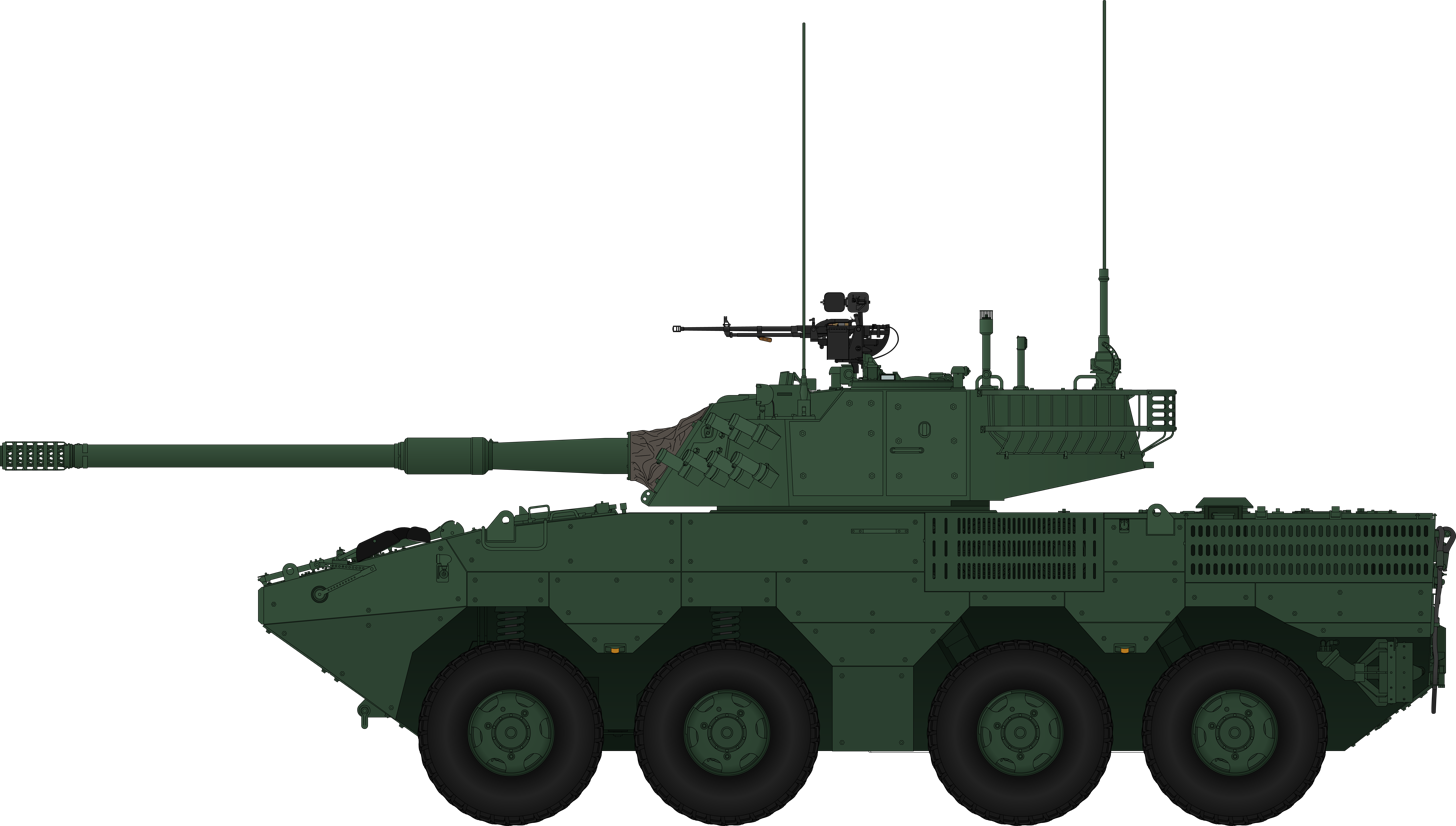
2D side-view reconstruction of the ZLT-11 assault gun

ZTL-11 (Type 11) assault gun
Armed with a 105 mm rifled gun, coaxial machine gun and 12.7 mm anti-air machine gun, the Assault gun is based on the IFV chassis and can provide direct fire support for infantry battalions and engage enemy light vehicles and stationary targets such as bunkers. ZTL-11 shares a turret very similar to ZTD-05 amphibious assaults vehicle. The vehicle is alternately designated ZLT-11.
PGL-12 (Type 12) anti-air gun-missile system
Armed with a single-barrel 35 mm revolver autocannon, derived from the 35 mm anti-aircraft gun system on PGZ-09. The turret is unmanned and remotely-operated by the crew inside the frontal compartment. A modular mounting provision for anti-air missiles is located at the forward-right side of the turret, with four TY-90 missiles seen on the export SWS2 version. Above the turret, there are electronic fire controls including a thermal-tracking sight, a targeting radar, and a surveillance radar. The data collected by the radars can be data-linked back to the command and armored reconnaissance vehicles. Although the system shares the armaments with PGZ-09, the loading mechanism is completely different. Since PGL-12 only has one barrel (whereas PGZ-09 has two), the new gun system requires a higher fire rate for sufficient firepower density. The redesigned unmanned turret with proprietary revolving loading system can provide a 1000 rounds/minute rate of fire, increased from the 550 rounds/minute per barrel on the PGZ-09.

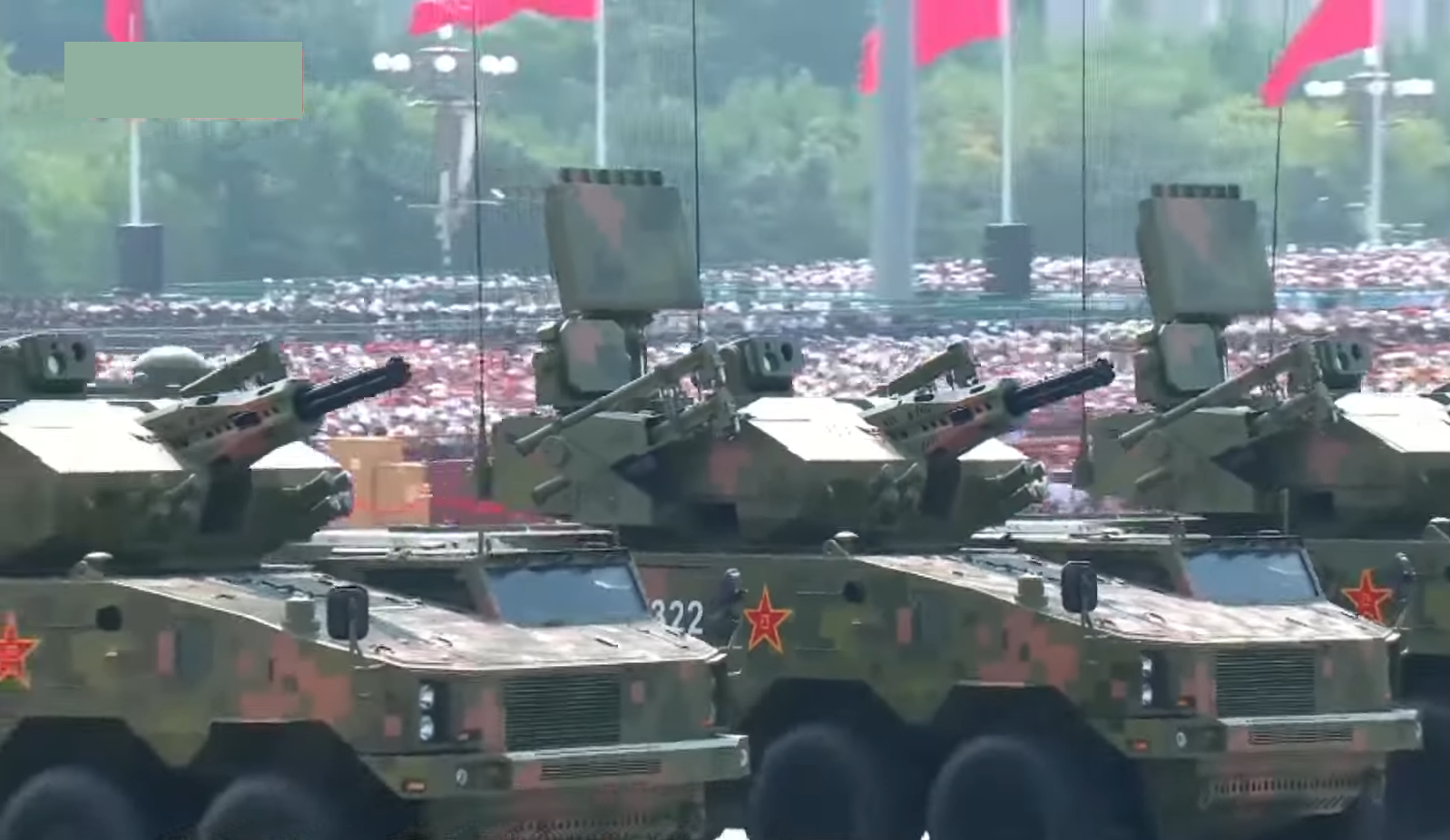
PLB-625 air defense variant

PLB-625 air defense gun-missile system
PLB-625 is an 8x8 air defense vehicle featuring a 6-barrel 25 mm Gatling-like rotary cannon and four FN-6B (FN-16) for short-range air defense. Code-named "625", the variant was revealed under testing in 2021. It uses 25x287 mm ammunition technology with upgraded radar, computer system, and data-link. The 625 anti-air system will be paired with HQ-17A wheeled short-range air-defense system. The Gatling system was deemed by the PLA to be better at counter rocket, artillery, and mortar missions. The vehicle is spotted in a military training mission at Tibet Military District.
Type 08 command vehicle
With a modified chassis that has a much higher ceiling than the APC variant, the crew cabin provides a more spacious environment for commanders and staff. Equipped with satellite communication suite and battle management system, the command vehicle can move with the mechanized infantry for better battlefield management.
Type 08 communication vehicle
Based on the command vehicle variant. It has additional communication equipment on board for the infantry battalion.
Type 08 armored ambulance
Based on the command vehicle variant. Featuring a modified crew cabin with medical equipment, the Armored Ambulance variant has two Red Cross markers on each side of the vehicle body.
Type 14 hazardous environment reconnaissance vehicle
Based on the command vehicle variant. Equipped with sensors and equipment for hazardous detection involving nuclear, biological and chemical environment.
Type 08 electronic warfare vehicle
Based on the command vehicle variant but the satellite communication suite on top of the vehicle roof is replaced by a rectangular shaped radar with several small radar panels for Electronic Support Measures.
GPZ-111A (Type 111A) assault breach vehicle
Based on the IFV variant. It is equipped with mine plow, mine detection device, and rocket-projected mine clearing line charge (MICLIC).
GQC-003 (Type 003) mobile bridge builder
Based on the IFV variant. It is equipped with a vehicle-launched bridge on top of the hull.
Type 08 armored recovery vehicle
Based on the IFV variant, the turret is replaced by a crane for emergency vehicle service.
Type 08 armored cargo vehicle
Based on the APC variant, the armored cargo vehicle has more bullet-proof windows on the vehicle body.
Type 08 engineering vehicle
The vehicle has a unique chassis. It is equipped with tools for road paving and obstacle neutralization. A bulldozer blade is fitted on the front of the vehicle, and an excavator bucket is mounted on the front end of the roof. Waterline marks can also be found on the side of the vehicle hull.:

=== Export variants ===
VN-1
Export variant based on Type 08 IFV. The VN-1C is armed with a 30 mm remote weapons station and a HJ-73 anti-tank missile.
ST-1
Export variant based on Type 11 assault gun, armed with a L7 105mm rifled gun. The turret is also used on the WMA301 and ST-2.
ST-3
Hybrid artillery tank destroyer, armed with a high elevation 105mm gun, similar to the Al-Fahd AF-40-8-2 or XM1202 MCS.
SH-11
Export-oriented 155 mm self-propelled howitzer armed with a 39-caliber gun, which can be replaced with a 52-caliber gun without changing the chassis. It features a fully automatic loading system and the latest generation of optics.
VS27
Armored rescue vehicle
VE36
Reconnaissance vehicle
VE32A
Reconnaissance vehicle
SWS-2
Export SHORAD gun/missile system variant of the VN-1. It is armed with a 35 mm cannon and four TY-90 surface-to-air missiles. This vehicle is the export version of the PGL-12 anti-air artillery system, sharing the same modified Type 08 chassis. In 2024, the SWS2 air defense system was updated, now with the additional designation "LD35". The SWS2/LD35 version uses an unmodified VN-1 chassis with a remotely-controlled turret. The turret has the same 35 mm cannon, but the missiles are replaced with six FB-10A.
CS/SA5
Specialized air defense variant with a 6-barrel 30 mm rotary cannon and FN-6 or FB-10A missiles. First seen at Zhuhai Airshow 2014, the early version of this export-oriented vehicle was based on a modified Type 08 IFV chassis. At the Zhuhai Airshow 2021, a new version was revealed, which features a new 8x8 chassis closely resembling the Type 625E. The turret included an air surveillance radar on the rear of the turret roof with a 2-axis adaptive-follow tracking radar situated on the starboard side of the surveillance radar while the thermal-tracking sight situated on the port side can provide visual information of the target through fire control computers.
Type 625E
Specialized air defense variant with a 6-barrel 25 mm rotary cannon and FB-10A short-range missiles. It uses the new CS/SA5 8x8 chassis shown at the Zhuhai Airshow 2021. The Type 625E is the export variant of the PLB-625.
Yitian 2
Air defense missile system, continuation of Yitian.
CS/AA5
Specialized IFV variants with a remote-controlled 40mm turret. The chassis of CS/AA5 is based on Type 08 IFV.
AFT-10 ATGM carrier
First shown at the 2018 Zhuhai Airshow.
JRVG-1A anti-air gun system
First shown at the 2018 Zhuhai Airshow. The JRVG-1A uses a stretched 10x10 Type 08 chassis. The picture shown in the catalog differs from the presented vehicle. The lower rear section of the hull is wider, where the waterjets are mounted on the 8x8 versions, which the presented vehicle misses. A variant called JRVG-1B with a chassis similar to was PGZ-09/PLZ-05 listed in the catalog too. The vehicle is armed with a naval 76mm turret, which includes a detection and fire control radar like the Italian Otomatic SPAAG. A water cooling system allows a fire rate of up to 300rpm.

== Operators ==
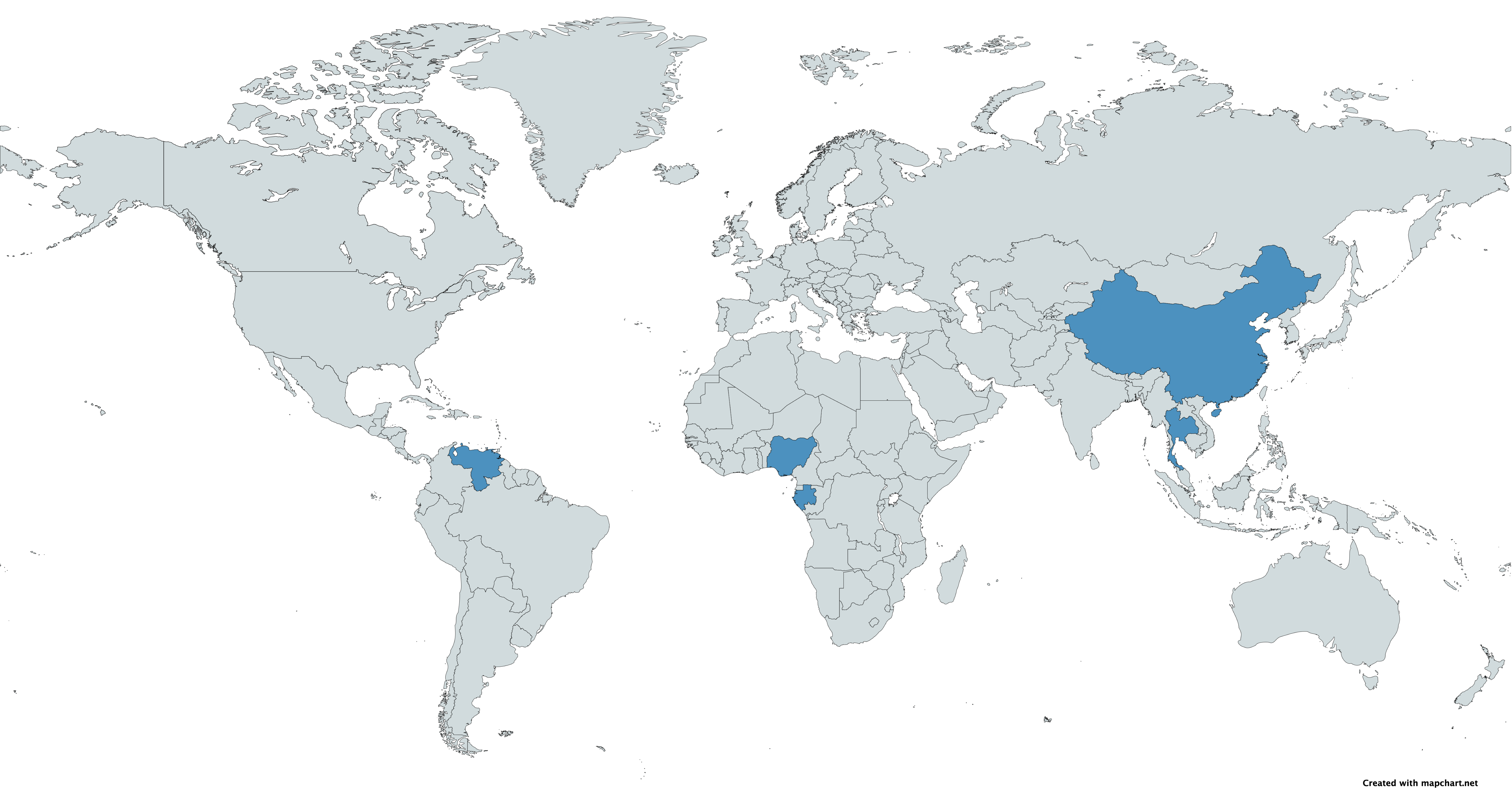
Map with Type 08 operators in blue

China

- People's Liberation Army Ground Force - 5,950+ units as of 2024. 3,250 units of ZBL-08; 1,200 units of ZTL-11; 900 units of ZSL-10; 600 units of PLL-09; Uncounted units of other variants.
- People's Liberation Army Marine Corps - 200+ units as of 2024. 150 units of ZBL-08; 50 units of ZTL-11; Uncounted units of other variants.

Gabon

- Gabonese Army: On display at the 2019 Independence Day parade.

Nigeria

- Nigerian Army: ST1

Pakistan

- Pakistan Army: Type 625E

Thailand

- The Royal Thai Army (RTA) signed a contract to purchase 38 VN-1 IFVs for first batch. Thailand ordered 37 more vehicles for second batch. The VN-1 was put into service in February 2021 with the 2nd Cavalry Regiment. By 2026, Thailand has 111 VN-1 vehicles in the fleet. 20 additional VN-1s were purchased in January 2026.

Venezuela

- Bolivarian Marine Infantry

=== Failed bids ===
Argentina
The Argentine Army showed interest in buying the Type 08 but ended selecting the Stryker family of armored vehicles.

Brazil
The Chinese government offered the ST-1 to the Brazilian Army in April 2021, under the Army's "VBC Cav" program to obtain 221 units of an 8 x 8 assault gun, for the replacement of the EE-9 Cascavel in operation since 1974. The Italian Centauro 2 was selected instead.

Morocco
In September 2024, it was reported that Indian Wheeled Armoured Platform (WhAP), produced by Tata Advanced Systems Limited (TASL) defeated China’s Type-08 armoured vehicle to produce up to 100 IFVs for the Morocco’s National Defence Administration.

== Gallery ==
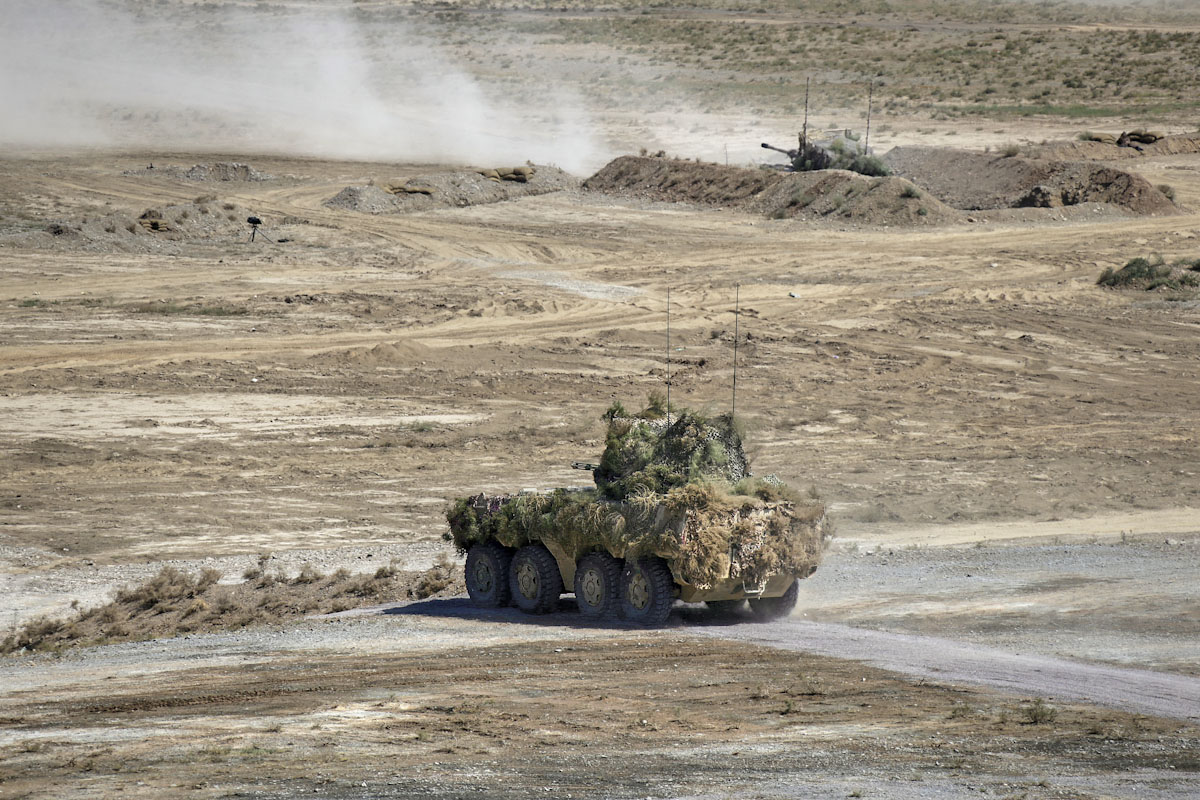
ZBL-08 IFV in camouflage

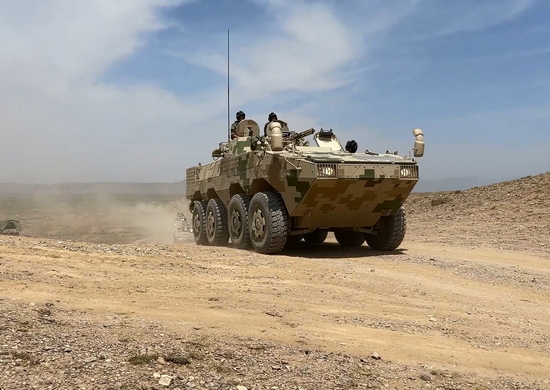
ZBL-08 moving

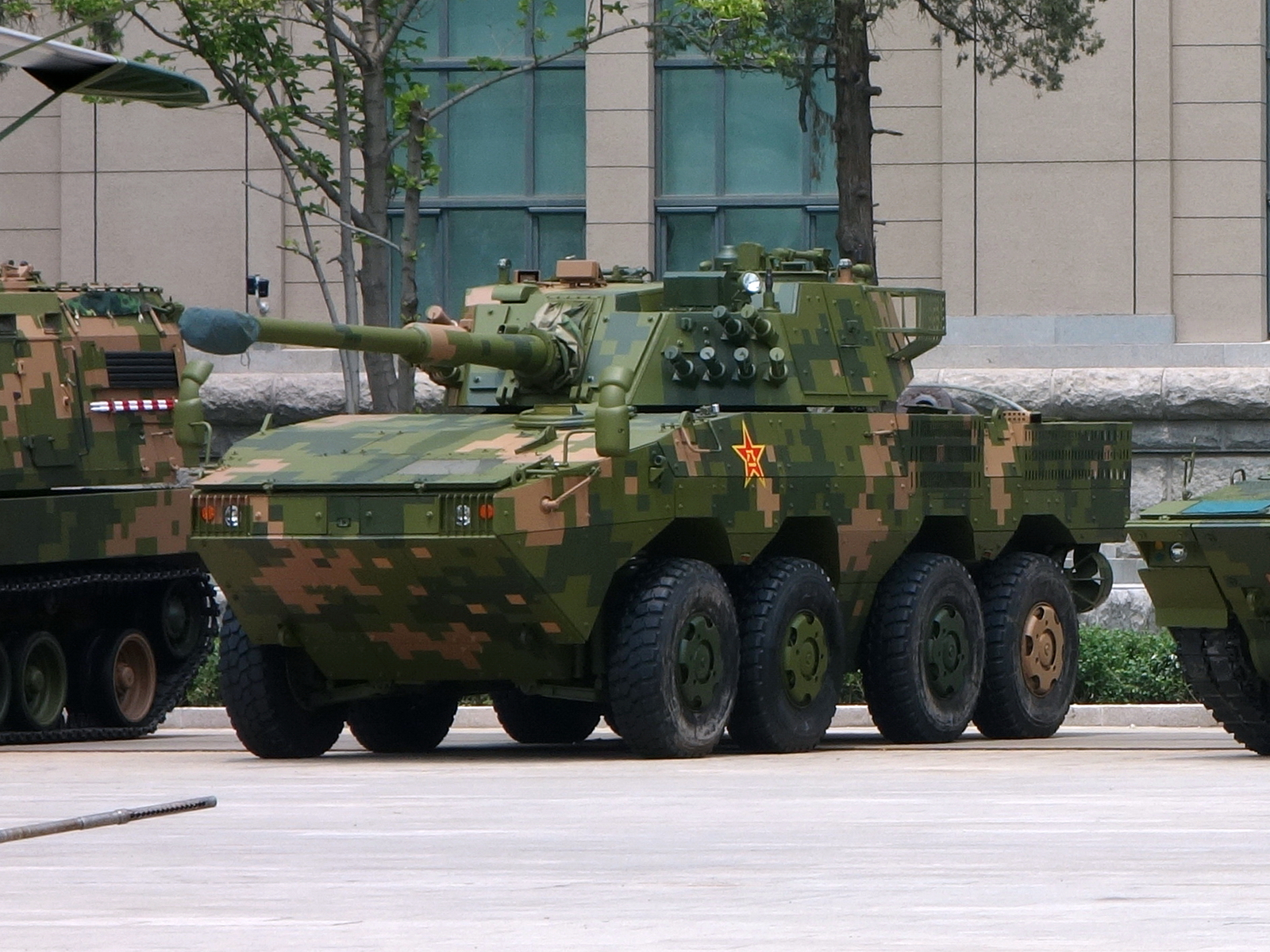
ZTL-11 at Theme Exhibition of the 90th Anniversary of Chinese People's Liberation Army.

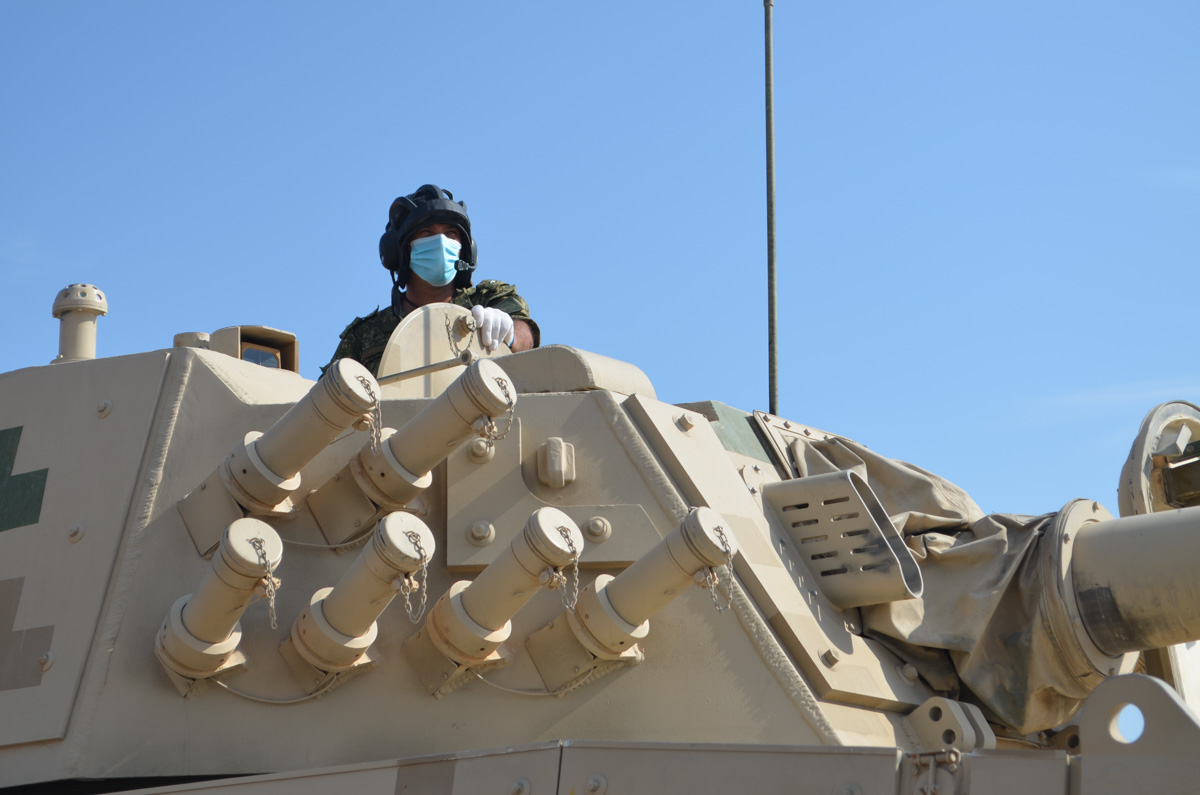
Smoke discharges on ZTL-11 assault gun

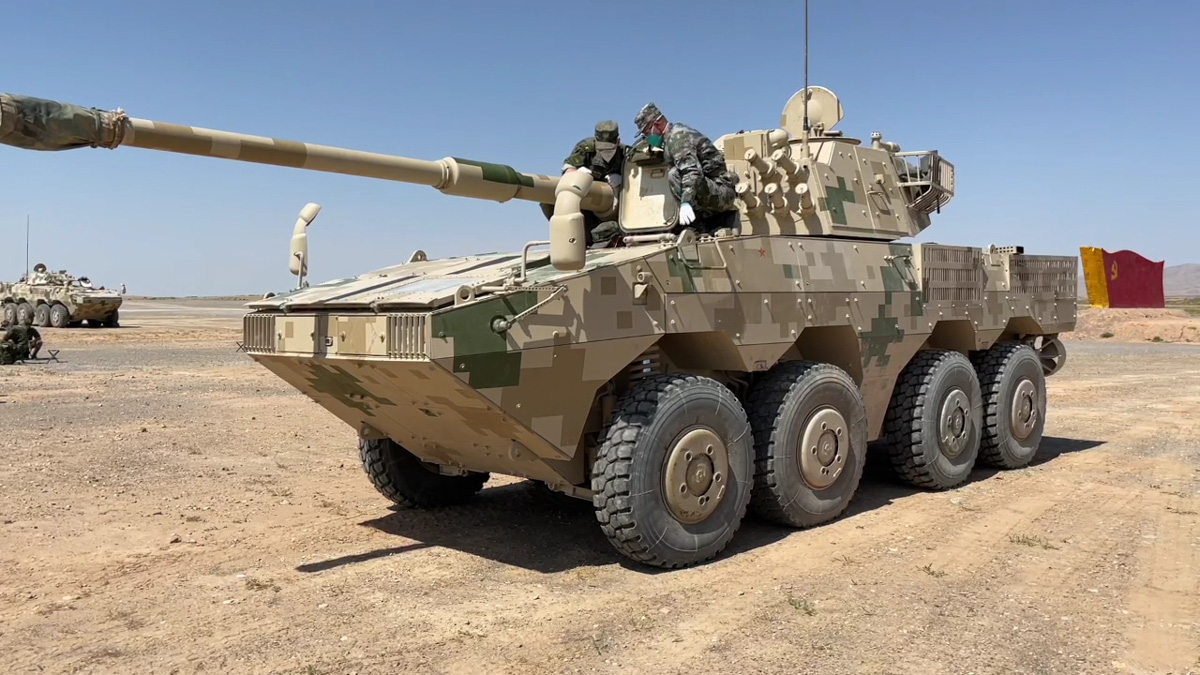
Chinese and Russian soldiers checking the ZTL-11 assault gun at Sibu/Interaction-2021 military exercises

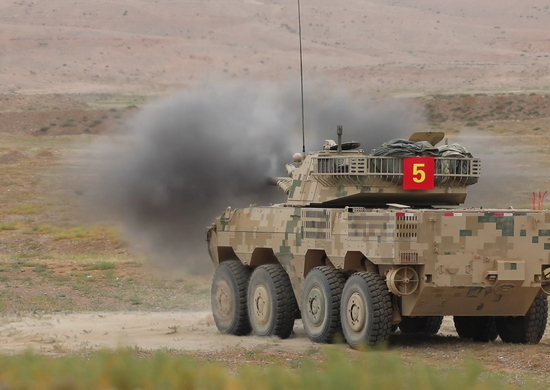
Rear side of ZTL-11

== See also ==
Related development

- ZBD-03 - airborne combat vehicle developed by China
- ZBD-04 - tracked infantry fighting vehicle developed by China
- ZBD-05 - amphibious fighting vehicle developed by China
- Type 07P - infantry fighting vehicle developed by China for export sales

Comparable ground systems

- KTO Rosomak – (Poland)
- Stryker – (United States, Canada)
  - M1128 mobile gun system – (United States, Canada)
  - M1134 anti-tank guided missile vehicle
- LAV II – (Canada)
  - LAV-25 – (Canada)
  - ASLAV – (Australia)
- LAV III – (Canada)
- Amphibious Combat Vehicle – (United States)
- K808 White Tiger – (South Korea)
- Boxer – (Germany, Netherlands)
- VBCI – (France)
- Freccia IFV – (Italy)
- VPK-7829 Bumerang – (Russia)
- CM-32 armoured vehicle – (Taiwan)
- Type 96 armored personnel carrier – (Japan)
- Type 16 maneuver combat vehicle – (Japan)
- Patria AMV – (Finland)
- DRDO WhAP – (India)
