= Shanghai Academy of Spaceflight Technology =

Chinese space agency

- 上海航天技术研究院

Agency overview
- Abbreviation: SAST
- Formed: 1 August 1961
- Type: Space agency
- Headquarters: Minhang District, Shanghai, China
- Official language: Standard Chinese
- Owners: Chinese central government; (via China Aerospace Science and Technology Corporation)
- Employees: 16,800+
- Annual budget: CN¥17.1 billion

Shanghai Academy of Spaceflight Technology
- Simplified Chinese: 上海航天技术研究院
- Traditional Chinese: 上海航天技術研究院
- Hanyu Pinyin: Shànghǎi Hángtiān Jìshù Yánjiùyuàn
- Literal meaning: Shanghai Spaceflight Technology Research Academy
Transcriptions
Standard Mandarin
- Hanyu Pinyin: Shànghǎi Hángtiān Jìshù Yánjiùyuàn

Alternative Chinese name
- Simplified Chinese: 中国航天科技集团公司第八研究院
- Hanyu Pinyin: Zhōngguó Hángtiān kējì jítuán gōngsī dìbā yánjiù yuàn
- Literal meaning: China Aerospace Science and Technology Corporation Eighth Research Academy
Transcriptions
Standard Mandarin
- Hanyu Pinyin: Zhōngguó Hángtiān kējì jítuán gōngsī dìbā yánjiù yuàn

Second alternative Chinese name
- Simplified Chinese: 上海航天局
- Hanyu Pinyin: Shànghǎi Hángtiān Jú
- Literal meaning: Shanghai Bureau of Spaceflight
Transcriptions
Standard Mandarin
- Hanyu Pinyin: Shànghǎi Hángtiān Jú

former name
- Simplified Chinese: 上海市第二机电工业局
- Literal meaning: Shanghai Municipality Second Bureau of Electromechanical Industry
Transcriptions

The Shanghai Academy of Spaceflight Technology (SAST) is a research institute affiliated with the China Aerospace Science and Technology Corporation.

The institute was established in August 1961 as Shanghai Second Bureau of Electromechanical Industry, but was later renamed to Shanghai Academy of Spaceflight Technology in 1993.

== Products ==
=== Space flight systems ===
SAST designs, develops, and manufactures launch vehicles as well as components. They designed and manufactured the Long March 2D, the entire Long March 4 series and FB-1 rockets. The FB-1 launched three military satellites, the details of which have not been published. SAST was held responsible for the FB-1 failures between 1973 and 1981.

As of 2024, SAST also designs, develops, and Manufactures launch Vehicles and Satellites. The Long March 2D, Long March 4B, Long March 4C, Long March 6, Long March 6A, Long March 6C and Long March 12 are launch Vehicles made by SAST.

=== Air defense systems ===
SAST produces several air defense missiles, including:

- FN series (Chinese: 飞鹰) man-portable air-defense system (MANPADS)
  - FN-6
  - FN-16
- FB series (Chinese: 飞豹) maneuver short-range air defense system (M-SHORAD)
  - FB-6
  - FB-10
- LY series (Chinese: 猎鹰) medium-range air defense system
  - LY-60 (HQ-6)
  - LY-70
  - LY-80 (HQ-16)
- Other missile systems
  - HQ-10
