= Lino de Clemente =

- Lino Antonio Ramón de Jesús de Clemente y Palacios
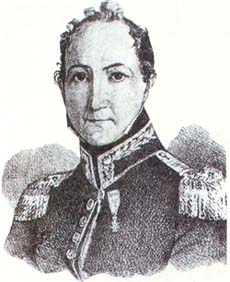
- Lino de Clemente.
- Born: September 23, 1767; Venezuela Province, Spanish Empire
- Died: 1834 (aged 66–67)
- Known for: Figure in the movement to obtain Venezuelan independence from Spain

Lino de Clemente (1767–1834) was a figure in the movement to obtain Venezuelan independence from Spain.

Clemente was born in what is now Venezuela and received his early education in Spain before joining the Spanish Navy, where he served from 1786 to 1798. In the 1790s, he served in the Napoleonic Wars in Europe. In 1811, he was part of the group that declared the independence of Venezuela.

Clemente married a sister of Simon Bolívar. In 1826, he served as minister of the navy for Gran Colombia. For a time in the 1810s, he lived with his family in exile in Philadelphia, Pennsylvania. There, he acted as an agent for the Venezuelan government in getting supplies to advance the interests of the revolution. After Venezuela had won independence from Spain, he worked to organize and establish the new state: he signed the Act of Independence and the first Constitution of the Republic, then held positions in the Venezuelan government until he retired from service in 1830.

== Sources ==
- source on Clemente
- another translated source on Clemente
- report on Clemente connected with a statue of him
