= 2A70 =

100 mm gun 2A70
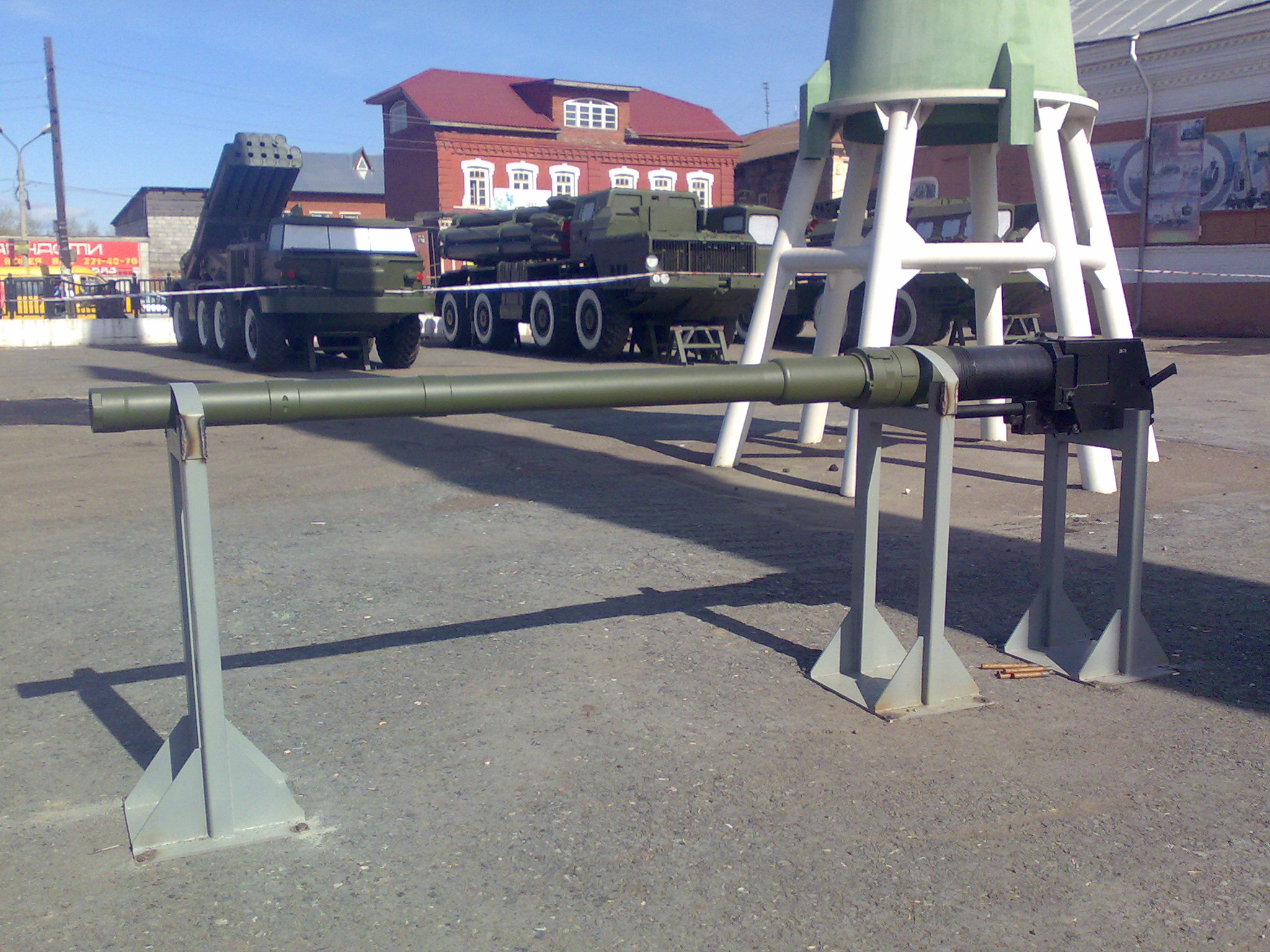
- 2A70 at the Motovilikha Plants museum
- Type: Gun-launcher
- Place of origin: Soviet Union

Service history
- In service: 1990–present
- Used by: See Operators

Production history
- Designer: KBP Instrument Design Bureau
- Designed: 1980s
- Manufacturer: Motovilikha Plants
- Produced: mid 1980s–present
- No. built: 2000+

Specifications
- Mass: 311.6 kilograms (687 lb)
- Length: 3,943 millimetres (155.2 in)
- Barrel length: > 3 m
- Width: 281 millimetres (11.1 in)
- Height: 404 millimetres (15.9 in)
- Caliber: 100 millimetres (3.9 in)
- Barrels: 1, rifled, no bore evacuator or muzzle device
- Rate of fire: 8–10 rounds per minute
- Muzzle velocity: See table: 3OF32: 250 m/s (820 ft/s); 3OF70: 355 m/s (1,160 ft/s)
- Effective firing range: 3OF32: 300 m (980 ft)–4,000 m (13,000 ft)
- Maximum firing range: 3OF70: 6,500 m (21,300 ft)
- Feed system: autoloader (shell); manual (shell and missile)

The 100 mm gun-launcher 2A70 (GRAU designation: 2А70) is a model of low-pressure rifled cannons designed in the Soviet Union by the KBP Instrument Design Bureau. Integrated into Bakhcha-U and Sinitsa turret modules, the gun equips the BMD-4, BMP-3, and BTR-90M infantry fighting vehicles. It is capable of launching the high-explosive fragmentation (HE-FRAG) 3OF32 and 3OF70 projectiles, as well as the 9M117 Bastion gun-launched anti-tank guided missiles (ATGM) and related systems.

China produces a similar gun used on the ZBD-04 IFV, using technologies licensed from Russia in 1996. The VN20 has a version with a 100-mm gun.

== History ==
By no later than 2006, the then-standard projectile 3OF32 was found to be underpowered. Being modified from the WW2 52-OF-412 projectile of the 100 mm field gun M1944 (BS-3), it was designed to withstand a higher ballistic-performance gun and thus has too thick walls and insufficient explosive filling.

== Ammunition ==
Table of ammunition
| Cartridge | Projectile | Muzzle velocity (m/s) | Mass (kg) | Range (km) | Area of destruction (m^{2}) | Penetration (mm RHA) |
HE-FRAG
| 3UOF17 | 3OF32 | 250 | 18.2 | 0.3–4.0 | 160 | — |
| 3UOF19 | 3OF70 | 355 | 15.8 | 0.3–6.5 | 360 | — |
| 3UOF19-1 | 3OF70 | 355 | 15.8 | 0.3–6.5 | 600 | — |
ATGM
| 3UBK10-3 | 9M117 Bastion | | 22 | 0.1–4.0 | — | 550 post-ERA |
| 3UBK10М-3 | 9M117M Kan | | 22.9 | 0.1–4.0 | — | ~600 post-ERA |
| 3UBK23-3 | 9M117M1 Arkan | | 21.5 | 0.1—5.5 | — | ~750 post-ERA |

The 3OF32 has a point-detonating (impact) fuse.

== Operators ==
See the articles for BMP-3, BMD-4, and ZBD-04.

== See also ==
- Shipunov 2A42
- 2A28 Grom
