= BMD-3 =

Russian light infantry fighting vehicle

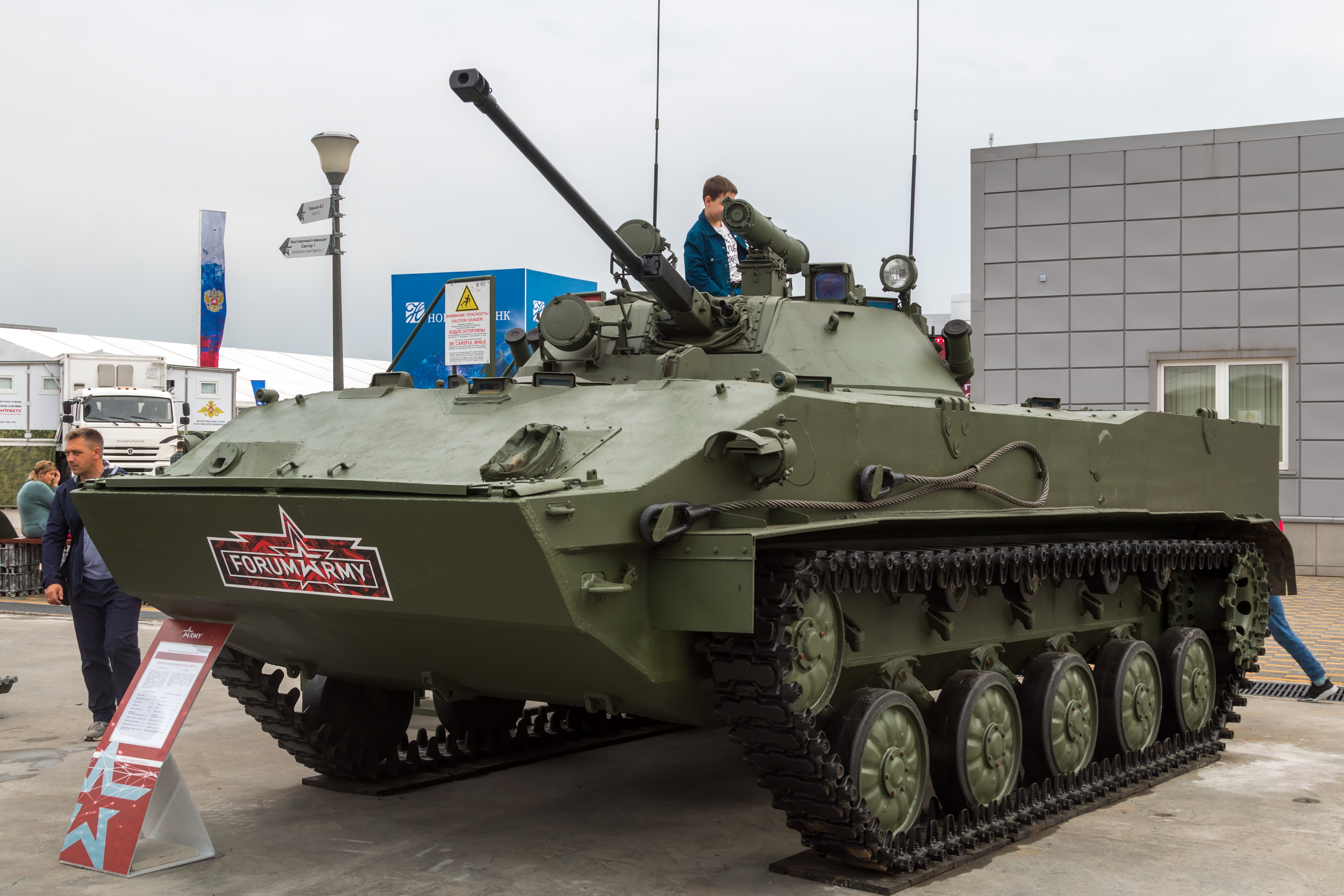
- A BMD-3
- Type: Airborne infantry fighting vehicle
- Place of origin: Soviet Union

Service history
- In service: 1990 – present

Production history
- Manufacturer: Volgograd Tractor Factory
- No. built: 137
- Variants: BMD-4, 2S25 Sprut-SD

Specifications
- Mass: 12.9 tonnes
- Length: 6 metres (20 ft)
- Width: 3.13 m (10.3 ft)
- Height: 2.25 m (7 ft 5 in)
- Crew: 3 (+4 passengers)
- Armor: Turret: Steel; Hull: Aluminium alloy
- Main armament: 2A42 30mm autocannon with coaxial 7.62mm PK machine gun, 9K11 or 9M111 ATGMs from turret mounted launcher
- Secondary armament: Bow-mounted AGS-17 Plamya 30 mm automatic grenade launcher and 5.45-mm RPK machine-gun
- Engine: 2V-06-2 water-cooled diesel 450 hp
- Power/weight: 34 hp/ton
- Suspension: Hydroneumatic with variable height control, 130–530 mm (5.1–20.9 in)
- Operational range: 500 km (310 mi)
- Maximum speed: 70 km/h (43 mph) off-road: 45 km/h (28 mph) water: 10 km/h (6.2 mph)

The BMD-3 (Boyevaya Mashina Desanta , Russian: Боевая Машина Десанта, lit. 'Combat Vehicle of the Airborne') is a light infantry fighting vehicle originating in the Soviet Union that is fully amphibious and air-droppable with crew inside. It is intended to be used by airborne and air assault units. It is not an upgraded BMD-1 but a completely redesigned vehicle with a hydropneumatic suspension, new hull, a more powerful 2V-06-2 diesel engine and fitted with the complete turret of the BMP-2.

== Development ==
Even before the start of the BMD-2's production, a new model of airborne infantry fighting vehicle was already envisaged by the Soviet military planners. This new type would first replace the BMD-1, and later the BMD-2. Two configurations were considered: one using the same armament as the future BMP-3, and another equipped with the BMP-2's turret. The latter option was chosen, because it would allow for a lighter vehicle (12.5 tonnes, compared to 18 tonnes for the other one). Six Object 950 prototypes were built in 1985 and 1986. The vehicle was manufactured at the Volgograd Tractor Factory in Volgograd, starting in 1990, the last year before the fall of the Soviet Union. While orders for several hundreds of BMD-3s were originally planned, the poor financial situation of the 1990s resulted in severe reductions of these orders. Only 137 BMD-3s were manufactured, with production stopping in 1997. The BMD-3 may not be in service anymore, or only with a very limited number of vehicles.

== Description ==
=== Overview ===
While still intended to be transported and airdropped by transport aircraft, the BMD-3 is bigger and heavier than its predecessors.

=== Crew ===
The BMD-3 is operated by three crew members. The driver is situated in the hull, while the gunner and the commander are in the turret. Thanks to its bigger size, the BMD-3 can carry up to seven dismounts, compared to five for the BMD-2. They are located around the turret basket. If the vehicle is intended to be airdropped, its capacity falls to four dismounts.

=== Turret ===
The BMD-3 has the same turret as the BMP-2.

=== Armament ===
The BMD-3 is armed with one stabilised 30 mm 2A42 autocannon with 500 rounds, with elevation angles up to 75°, and one coaxial 7.62 mm PKT machine gun. It also has a 9P135M missile launcher for 9K111 Fagot and 9M113 Konkurs ATGMs. An RPK-74 5.45 mm machine gun is placed on the right-hand side of the hull, while an AGS-17 automatic grenade launcher is placed on the left-hand side.

=== Mobility ===
The BMD-3 is powered by a 450 hp 2V-06-2 engine. Its maximum speed is 70 km/h on roads, and 45 km/h cross-country. The BMD-3 is amphibious, with a maximum speed of 10 km/h on water. A new parachute system was specifically designed for the BMD-3, in order to cope with its higher weight.

== Variants ==
- BMD-3 (Object 950) - Basic type, as described.
- BMD-4 (Object 960) - Modified chassis with new turret "Bakhcha-U" comprising: 100 mm main gun 2A70, 30mm autocannon 2A72, 7.62 mm machine gun, and new fire control system "Ramka". The bow-mounted AGS-17 has been removed. The armament is similar to that of the BMP-3. BMD-4s are new-build or upgraded BMD-3s. The prototype was known as BMD-3M. The BMD-4 is no longer being purchased for the Russian troops, in favor of the BMD-4M.
- RKhM-5 (Object 958) - Chemical reconnaissance vehicle, fitted with the same specialised equipment as the BTR-80 version RKhM-4. The turret has been removed; the RKhM-5 has a fixed superstructure with machine gun turret.
- BTR-MD “Rakushka” (Object 955) - Multi-role transport vehicle with bigger hull and no turret. This type can be used to transport troops, fuel, ammunition and wounded personnel. It also serves as the basis for a new range of specialised vehicles for the Russian airborne forces, including a mortar platform, an ambulance BMM-D, a command post vehicle and a recovery vehicle. Some of the variants will have a longer chassis with 7 road wheels and probably the same 510 hp engine as the 2S25.
- 2S25 Sprut-SD (Object 952) - Self-propelled anti-tank gun, armed with a 125 mm gun 2A75 that has similar ballistics as the main gun of the 2A46 series and can also fire the ATGM 9M119 Svir. The chassis has 7 instead of 5 road wheels on each side and the engine is now the 2V-06-2S of 510 hp. The 2S25 has a combat weight of 18 tonnes and a crew of 3. It entered service in 2007.

== Operators ==
=== Current operators ===
- Ukraine - 8 BTR-MDM "Rakushkas" have been captured from Russian forces during the Russian invasion of Ukraine.
- Russia - Originally approved for serial production in 1990, under the Soviet Union, with up to 700 vehicles planned. Ultimately, only 137 vehicles were completed in eight years of production. The BMD-3 is no longer in service anymore, with production favouring the BMD-4M and BTR-MDM. In 2016 Russia had only 10 BMD-3 in service, alongside 100 BMD-1, 1,000 BMD-2, 42 BMD-4/4M, and 12 BTR-MDM. In 2022, prior to the Russian invasion of Ukraine, Russia had approximately 1,000 BMD-2, 351 BMD-4M, and 122 BTR-MDM vehicles in active service. During the War in Ukraine, Russia is visually confirmed to have lost at least 315 BMD-2, 149 BMD-4M and 45 BTR-MDM.

=== Former operators ===
- China - The BMD-3 served in the Chinese Air Force Airborne Corps with limited numbers. Replaced by ZBD-03.
- Angola - small number Ex-Russian BMD-3s exported to Angola

== See also ==
- BMD-1, BMD-2, BMD-4
- BMP-1, BMP-2, BMP-3
- List of AFVs
- Russian Airborne Troops
