= 2S42 Lotos =

Russian self-propelled mortar

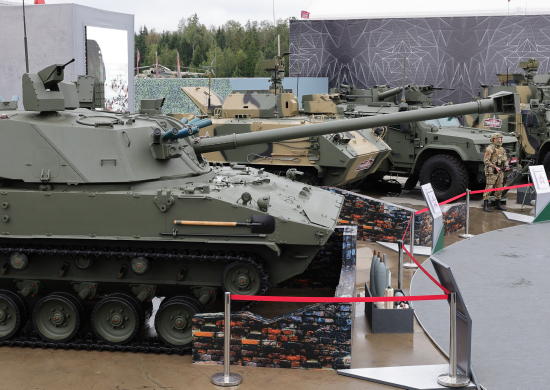
- 2S42 Lotos in the foreground
- Type: Self-propelled mortar
- Place of origin: Russia

Production history
- Designer: TsNIITochMash
- Designed: 2016-present

Specifications
- Mass: 18 tonnes
- Length: 7085 mm
- Width: 3152 mm
- Crew: 4
- Caliber: 120 mm
- Traverse: 360°
- Rate of fire: 6-8 round per minute
- Maximum firing range: 13 km
- Engine: 2V-06-2 diesel 450 hp
- Power/weight: 28,3 hp per ton
- Suspension: Hydropneumatic suspension
- Operational range: 500 km
- Maximum speed: 70 km/h

2S42 "Lotos" (Russian: 2С42 «Лотос»; "Lotos") is a developing Russian self-propelled 120 mm mortar system meant for the Russian Airborne Forces. It is based on the BMD-4M chassis and is intended to replace the 2S9 Nona self-propelled mortar.

== Development ==
The 2S42 Lotos self-propelled artillery system was developed by TsNIITochMash specialists as part of the replacement of the 2S36 Zauralets-D self-propelled gun project with a 152-mm 2A89 howitzer, after work on it was suspended in 2015 after preliminary tests.

2S42 is intended for airborne troops to replace the Soviet 120-mm airborne self-propelled artillery 2S9.

As of October 2018, the design work had been completed, and according to the General Director of TsNIITochMash, the first prototype was under construction. Individual components tests were carried out as scheduled. It was expected that state trials would be conducted in 2019. In an interview with RIA Novosti published in August 2023, Dmitry Yuryevich Semizorovchief, chief director of TsNIITochMash, confirmed that from October 2020 to March 2022, Lotos underwent preliminary trials. TsNIITochMash was addressing the comments received during trials, after which two prototypes of “Lotos” would be sent for state tests.

== Description ==
=== Hull ===
Due to the need for new modules on the 2S42, the original BMD-4M hull was lengthened, while maintaining the layout and protection level. It weighs 18 tons. Each of the four crew members has a hatch and viewing devices. The commander and gunner's seats are equipped with new optical-electronic sighting devices. Two crew members are located in the front of the hull; two more are in the fighting compartment.

=== Armament ===
The main armament is a 120 mm breech-loaded mortar 2A80-1. Like its predecessors (2S9 and 2S31), it is a hybrid of a howitzer and a mortar that lacks a direct NATO counterpart. The gun can deliver both direct and indirect fire. It can fire special 120 mm rifled rounds, developed for Russian mortar systems, such as the previous 2S9 Nona-S, and any 120 mm mortar bombs. It can fire at a rate of 6–8 rounds per minute. The Lotos has a maximum firing range of 13 km and a minimum firing range of 1 km. The Lotos can carry up to 40 rounds of ammunition in its automated loading system. For self-defense, the Lotos is fitted with a remotely controlled weapon station, armed with a 7.62 mm machine gun. Smoke grenade dischargers are included.

=== Chassis ===
Due to the lengthening of the hull and the vehicle's increased weight, the original BMD-4M chassis was lengthened to 7 road wheels - an additional 2 pairs were added. The maximum speed is up to 70 km/h on public roads, and up to 40 km/h on rough terrain. Operational range is 500 km.

== Service history ==
In late March of 2024 a 2S42 was sighted with additional slat armor and camouflage netting being transported by a truck which was supposedly heading to (or from) Ukraine, where the 2S42 was speculated to be carrying out combat trials.
