= 2S25 Sprut-SD =

Russian self-propelled tank destroyer

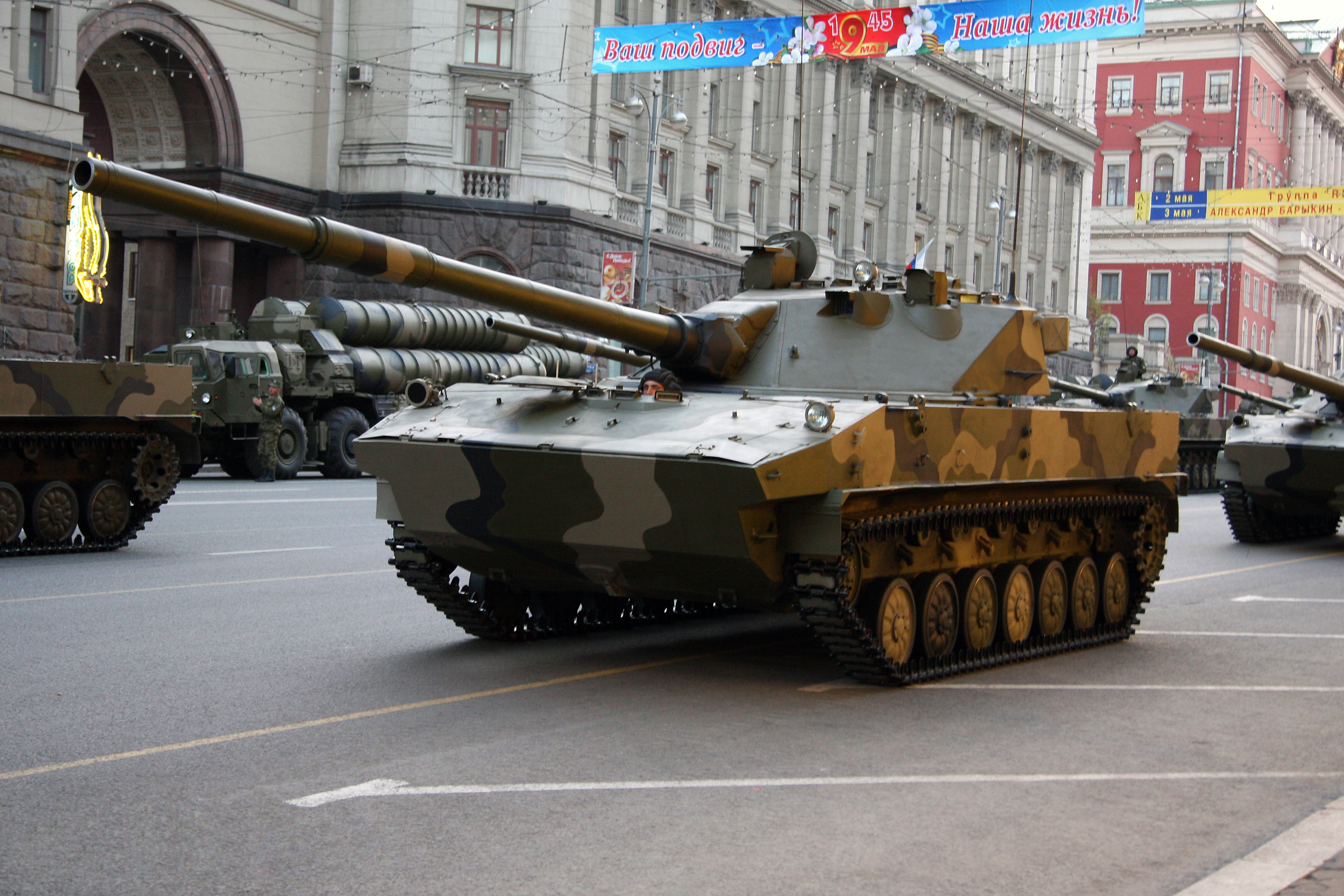
- 2S25 Sprut-SD at the 2008 Moscow Victory Day parade
- Type: Light tank Self-propelled amphibious tank destroyer
- Place of origin: Russia

Service history
- In service: 2005−present
- Used by: Russia
- Wars: Russo-Ukrainian War

Production history
- Designed: 1984–2001
- Manufacturer: Volgograd Tractor Plant
- Produced: 2001–2010, 2018–present

Specifications
- Mass: 18 t (20 short tons; 18 long tons)
- Length: 9.77 m (32 ft 1 in) (gun forward); 7.08 m (23 ft 3 in) (chassis)
- Width: 3.15 m (10 ft 4 in)
- Height: 2.72 m (8 ft 11 in)
- Crew: 3
- Armor: Turret: Welded steel Hull: Aluminium alloy with composite skin
- Main armament: 125 mm 2A75 smoothbore gun
- Secondary armament: 7.62 mm PKT coaxial machine gun
- Engine: 2V-06-2S water cooled diesel engine 510 hp (380 kW)
- Power/weight: 28.3 hp/tonne (21.1 kW/tonne)
- Suspension: Hydropneumatic suspension with variable height control (190 mm−590 mm)
- Operational range: 500 km (310 mi)
- Maximum speed: 70 km/h (43 mph) (road); 45 km/h (28 mph) (off-road); 10 km/h (6.2 mph) (water)

The 2S25 Sprut-SD (Russian: 2С25 «Спрут-СД»; 2S25 "Octopus-SD") is a light self-propelled anti-tank gun/tank developed and to be manufactured by the Volgograd Tractor Plant to meet the requirements of the VDV. In mid-2001, the Volgograd tractor plant revealed that the development of the 2S25 had lasted several years.

The Sprut-SD is designed to defeat main battle tanks, hard-skinned material, enemy manpower by airborne and amphibious landing forces, as well as by specially designated units of ground forces. Its main armament, the 125 mm 2A75, is capable of firing APFSDS, HE-Frag, HEAT and ATGM ammunition. This allows the 2S25 firepower to be as powerful as a main battle tank and as maneuverable and amphibious as airborne infantry combat vehicles. The 2S25 can be used by units of ground forces and naval infantry as a light amphibious tank. As of 2011 the only operators of the 2S25 are the Russian airborne troops with 24 of these vehicles in service.

== History ==
In the early 1990s, the Volgograd Tractor Plant created a new self-propelled tank destroyer based on a modified prototype light tank classified as Object 934. The plant was also the designer and manufacturer of the BMD-1, BMD-2, BMD-3 and latest BMD-4 airborne combat vehicles that are used by the Russian Air Assault Divisions. After the completion of the chassis modification, it received the index "Object 952". The turret was developed in Yekaterinburg artillery plant number 9. In mid-2001, it was stated that the Volgograd tractor plant had been working on the 2S25 for about seven years. Recent information has indicated that production of the BMD-4 airborne combat vehicle has been transferred to the Kurgan Machine Construction Plant, where production of the BMP-3 armored fighting vehicle and its variants are currently undertaken for the local and export markets. As far as it is known, production of the 2S25 self-propelled anti-tank gun is still being carried out at the Volgograd tractor plant. One of its first trials took place on May 8, 2001, on the "Prudboy" tank firing range located North Caucasian military district for the representatives of the power ministries of Russia and foreign military and diplomatic corps from 14 other countries of Southeast Asia, the Middle East, Africa and South America.

According to Russian information, the Russian Army placed an initial contract for 15 2S25 SPATG in three batches of five vehicles each in 2005. This was followed by a second batch of 45 units with the total requirement being for up to 85–110 units. However, there were only four batteries (24 vehicles) in service with the airborne forces as of 2009. In 2010, the cancellation of further procurement was announced as well as the termination of release due to a fire caused by a fuel leakage on one of the vehicles after a military parade on Red Square. The cancellation of further purchases was later denied by VDV commander Vladimir Shamanov in an interview with RIA Novosti military commentator Ilya Kramnik. In February 2016 serial production was expected to start in 2018, but as of August 2022 it is still being prepared.

== Description ==
The 2S25 is based on the chassis of the BMD-3 Infantry fighting vehicle, which is also produced by the Volgograd tractor factory and is in service with the Russian airborne troops. Notable distinctions from the BMD-3 are the armament, the fire control system and the addition of two wheels to each side of the vehicle; which increases the number to seven on each side. The crew is located at the front of the chassis. The turret and ammunition occupies the middle of the vehicle, while the engine-transmission compartment is towards the rear. The driver has a hatch on the front deck; the commander and gunner have hatches on the turret deck. In the stowed position, the commander sits to the right of the driver, while the gunner sits to the left. Each crew member has available built-in roof observant instruments with the day and night channels. Standard equipment includes an electronic NBC protection system to ensure survivability of the crew in case of nuclear fallout.

=== Armament ===
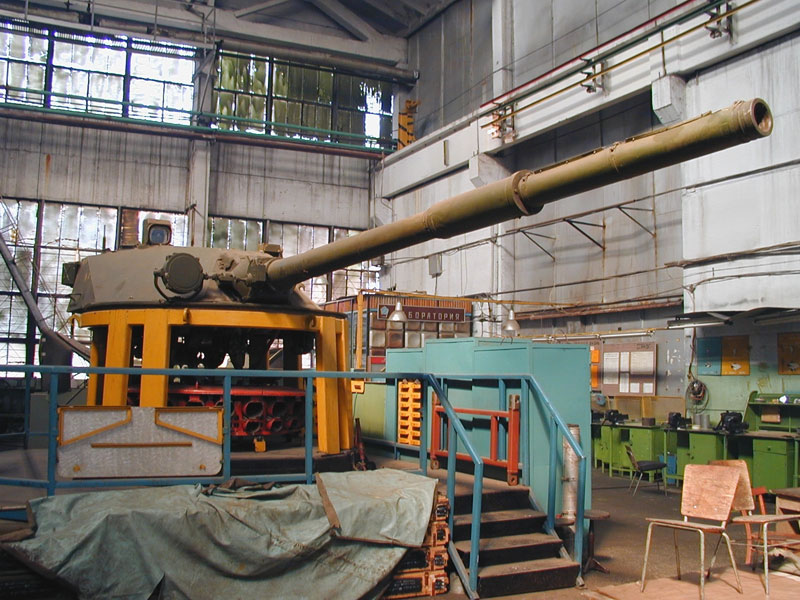
The main armament of the 2S25 is capable of firing the same ammunition used by the T-72, the T-80 and the T-90.

The main armament of the 2S25 is a two-man turret armed with a 125 mm smoothbore 2A75 tank gun, which is a derivative of the 125 mm 2A46 tank gun. The gun is fitted with an autoloader, with a rate of fire of 6−8 rounds per minute with both conventional projectiles and rounds with guided missiles. It can carry 40 rounds for the main armament, with 22 ready to use in the autoloader. In case the autoloader is no longer intact, manual loading is possible at the cost of a substantially longer reload time. The 2A75's ammunition is the same 125 mm separate case ammunition loadings that are used for the 2A46 smoothbore tank gun installed on Russian main battle tanks, including laser guided missiles like the 9M119 Svir, which have a maximum range of 4 km. The 2A75 is completely stabilized in the vertical and horizontal planes, and includes a laser rangefinder and a ballistic computer. The two-plane stabilization of the commander's sight is aligned with the laser sight for aiming the 125 mm shells onto the laser rangefinder. The angles of elevation and depression for the anti-tank gun are +15° and −5° respectively. When aimed towards the stern of the vehicle, the elevation and depression of the gun changes to +17° and −3° respectively. Given the need to install the gun into a substantially lighter chassis, designers created a new recoil device with a new ejector and thermal insulation jacket; it lacks a muzzle brake. A coaxial 7.62 mm PKT machine gun mounted to the left side of the main armament serves as the secondary armament of the 2S25; equipped with one tape of 2000 rounds. Later versions added a Remote Weapon Station with an additional 7.62 mm PKT machine gun on top of the turret.

=== Mobility ===
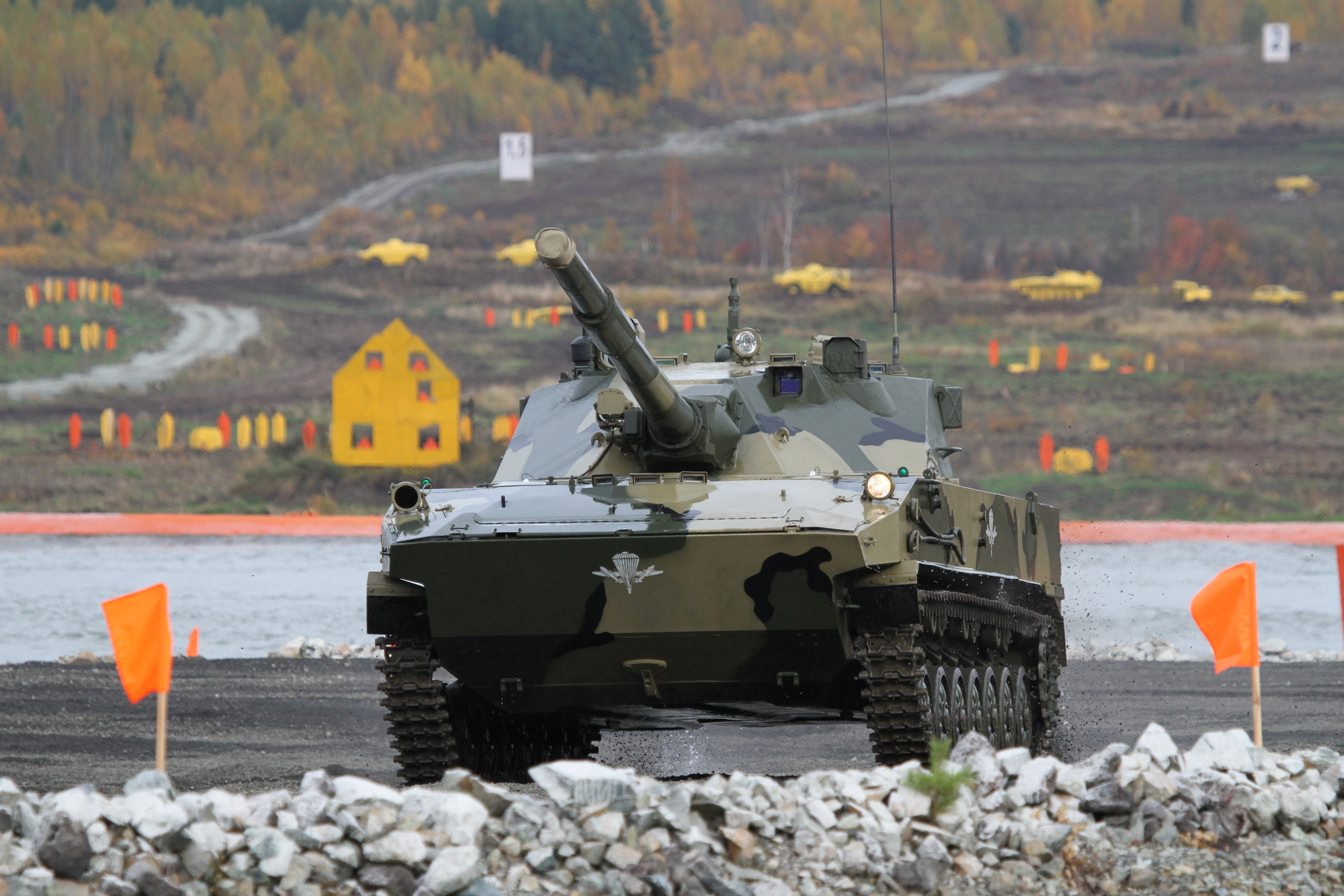
As of September 2013, the only operators of the 2S25 are the Russian airborne troops.

The weight of the 2S25 is 18 tonnes, which is comparable to that of infantry fighting vehicles. Like the BMD-3, the 2S25 features hydropneumatic suspension with a variable height clearance of 190–590 mm, which can be altered within 6–7 seconds to reduce visibility. Hydropneumatic suspension provides high smoothness while driving and dampens recoil of the main gun. Suspension on each side consists of seven single rollers, four support rollers, rear wheel drive and a front-mounted steering wheel. There are hydraulic track adjusters in assistance for greater mobility. In the engine-transmission compartment, multi-fuel diesel engine 2V-06-2S installed, which develops a power of 510 hp (380 kW). It features an automatic transmission that has five gears forward and five gears reverse.

While driving, the 2S25 can reach a top speed of 71 kilometres per hour (44 mph) on an even road; the average speed being 45−50 km/h (28-31 mph) when driving off-road. The vehicle exerts a ground pressure of 0.36 to 0.53 kg/cm^{2} depending on the type of tracks. It can overcome vertical obstacles as tall as 0.8 metres (2.6 ft) and cross 2.8 metres (9.2 ft) trenches. Like many other Russian armored fighting vehicles, the Sprut-SD is completely amphibious and moves with the help of two water jets that allow it to reach a speed of 8–10 km/h depending on the state of the currents. To increase the buoyancy, wheels are equipped with airtight chambers and powerful water pumps; extracting water from the lower chassis. The vehicle is sea worthy and can cross water obstacles without preparation in a sea state of up to 3. While waterborne, the 2S25 retains the capability of firing the gun within a ±35° sector towards the front of the chassis.

=== Protection ===
The hull of the 2S25 self-propelled anti-tank gun is composed of welded aluminium armor with a composite skin to maintain a light weight. Through the frontal arc, 40° left and right of the frontal armor provides protection against attack from 23 mm weapons at 500 m (550 yd) and against small arms fire and shell splinters through the remainder of the vehicle. Two banks of three smoke-grenade dischargers are mounted towards the rear on each side of the turret as countermeasures to infrared weapons.

== Variants ==
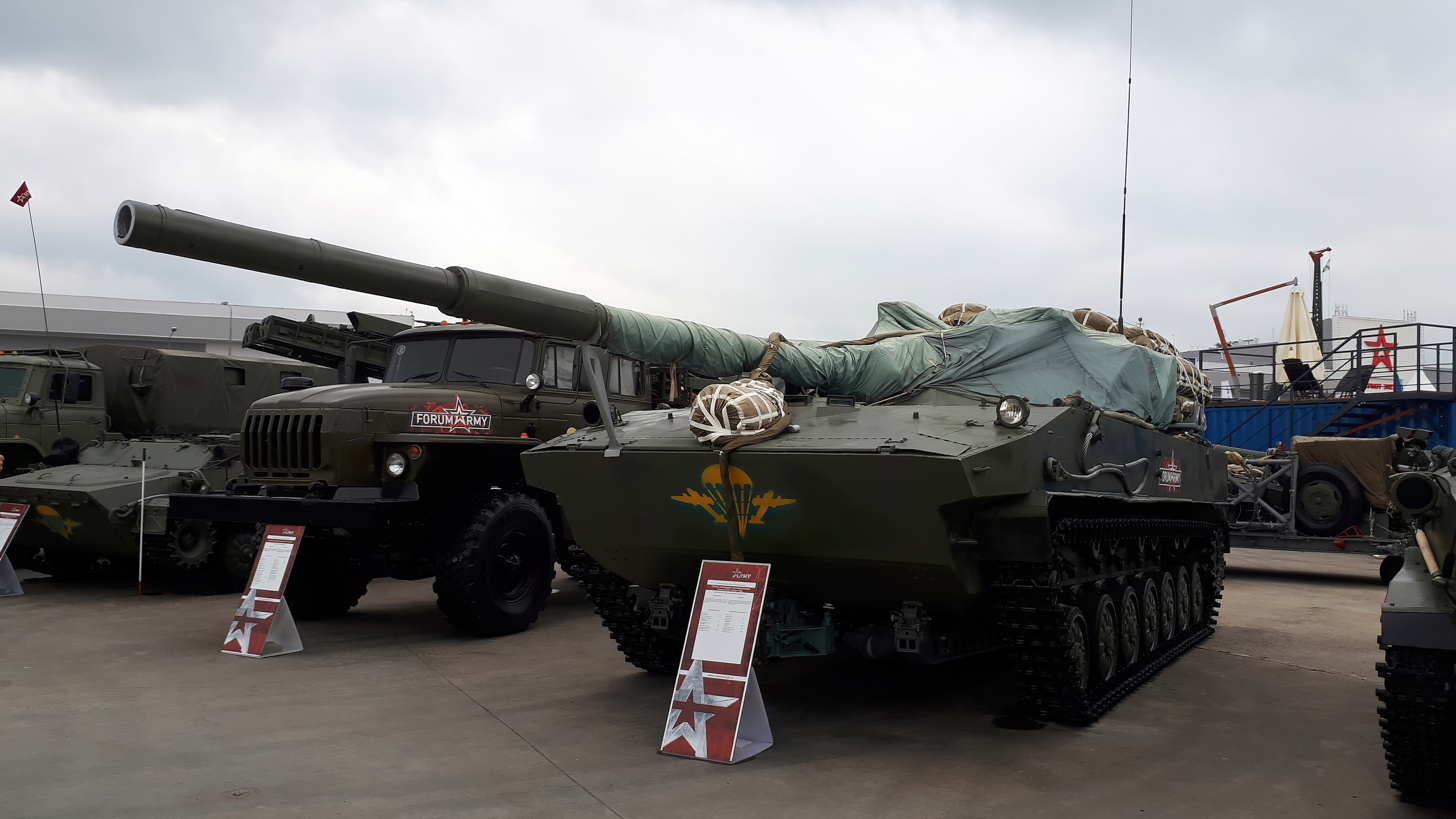
"Sprut-SD" for airborne forces (equipped with parachutes)

- Sprut-SDM1: New version with fire-control system and remote weapon station. Also received shells with remote detonation.

== Deployment ==
Possessing a high power-to-weight ratio of 28.3 hp/tonne, the 2S25 can operate in high altitudes of up to 4000 m, while the installed rubber-clad shoes or snow-riding tracks expand the vehicle's capabilities in various climates. According to the manufacturer, the 2S25 can also be employed as a light amphibious tank by rapid deployment forces, airborne, marine and special purpose units. With its low weight, it can become essential in mountains and swamps regions, where heavy equipment cannot travel. The 2S25 is designed to be parachuted from aircraft such as the Il-76 with the crew inside, allowing nearly immediate combat readiness upon landing to provide high firepower alongside paratroopers.

The tank destroyer Sprut-SD is tasked specifically with seeking out and destroying enemy tanks and armoured fighting vehicles, whether from an entrenched position or actively hunting. The relatively large gun provided with such a mobile, airborne chassis allows paratroopers both significant fire support and sustained contact when engaging hard targets, such as entrenchments, fortifications and concrete structures (an often difficult task for airborne or light infantry). While amphibious, it can climb onto ships under its own power during a combat mission.

== Operators ==
Russia

- Russian airborne troops – 24 vehicles were in service during 2009 with further orders being cancelled in 2010. In 2013, the Russian airborne troops ordered a new 125 mm self-propelled gun to replace 2S25, based on the BMD-4 chassis with a 2A46M-5 125 mm gun. In August 2022, the Russian state conglomerate Rostec stated that tests were completed and production facilities for mass production were being prepared. In August 2023, it was announced that the gun was ready for series production.

=== Potential operators ===
China

- Allegedly according to some 800 pages of seemingly genuine leaked documents analyzed by RUSI, Russia in 2023 agreed to supply China with equipment to outfit an airborne assault battalion, as well as Dalnolyot parachute systems, Orlan-10 drones and 1V119 airborne artillery command and observation systems. Along with the equipment, Russia will also begin training Chinese troops on the operation of the provided equipment and establish center for maintenance and repair of equipment for which all technical documents will be transferred-allowing the People's Liberation Army to undertake production and modernization of the equipment provided. Among the equipment to be provided are: 37 BMD-4M infantry fighting vehicles, 11 BTR-MDM Rakushka armored personnel carriers and 11 2S25 Sprut-SDM1 self-propelled anti-tank guns. All vehicles provided will be equipped with Chinese communication and command and control suites, as well as being electromagnetically compatible with Russian electronics. Software and hardware has been made compatible for Chinese rounds and munitions.

== See also ==
- BMD-4 – (Russia)
- T-90 – (Soviet Union, Russia)
- Type 15 tank – (China)
- M10 Booker – (United States)
- Zorawar (tank) – (India)
- Sabrah light tank – (Israel, Spain, Czech Republic)
- ST-2 – (China)
