= VN20 =

Chinese heavy infantry fighting vehicle

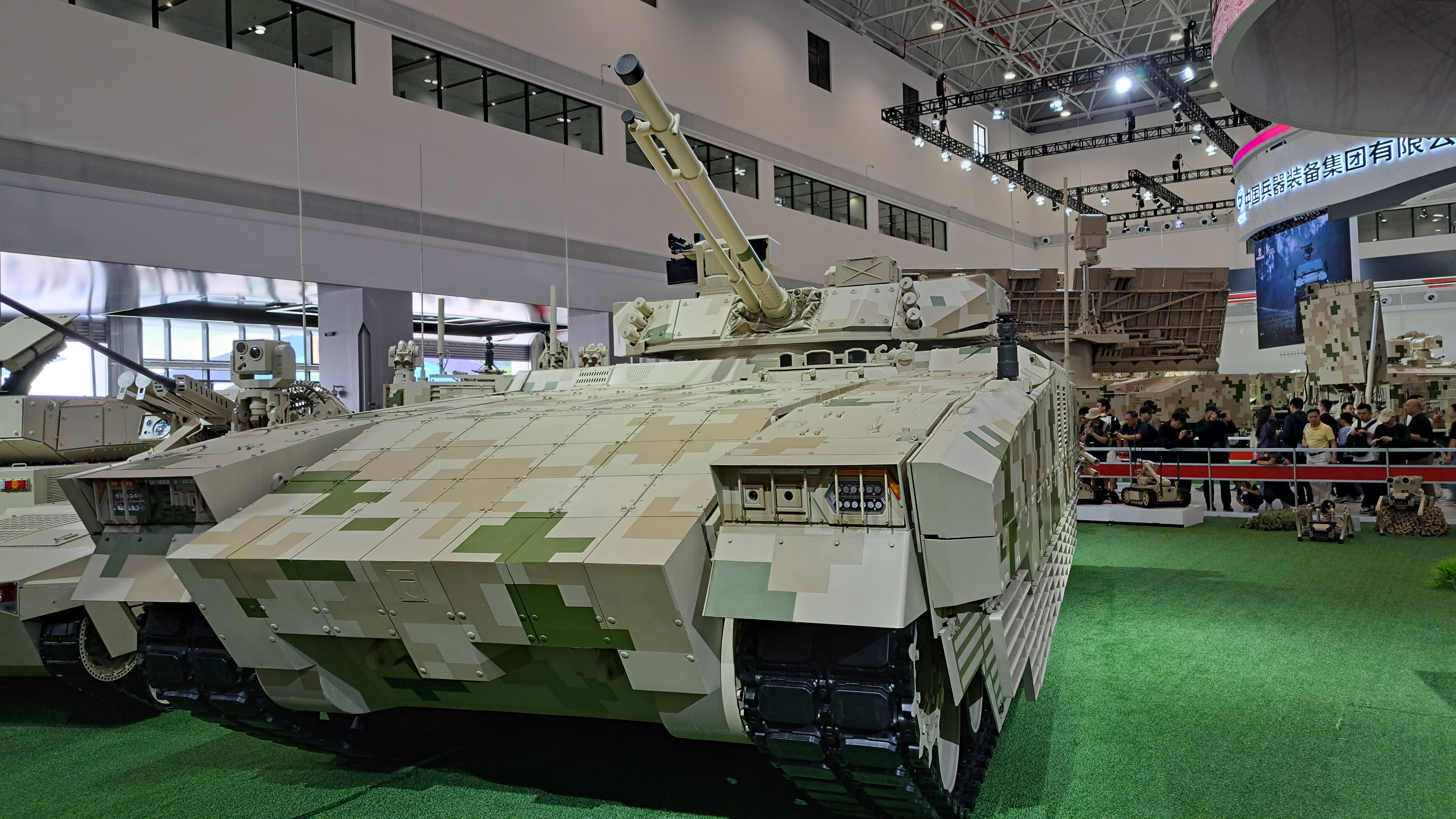
- VN20 in Zhuhai airshow 2024
- Type: Heavy Infantry Fighting Vehicle
- Place of origin: China

Production history
- Designer: NORINCO
- Manufacturer: NORINCO

Specifications
- Mass: 50 tonnes
- Crew: 3
- Passengers: 6
- Armor: Level 6 STANAG 4569
- Main armament: 30mm autocannon RCWS and ATGM launcher (exhibit) or; 100mm cannon, coaxial 30mm autocannon, and twin HJ-12 launchers (catalogue)
- Secondary armament: One of: Coaxial machine gun (exhibit) or; Light machine gun RCWS (catalogue); 2 remote-controlled 7.62 mm machine guns (rear hull, optional)
- Engine: diesel
- Suspension: torsion bar

The VN20 is a Chinese "Heavy-Duty Infantry fighting vehicle" developed by Norinco, revealed on the Zhuhai Airshow 2020.

Norinco uses the "VNxx" designation for exported Infantry fighting vehicles.

== Design ==
The VN20 was developed from the VT-4 main battle tank chassis and uses the same suspension, the motor is placed at the front to keep space for troops in the back. The driver seat is placed on the left side next to another seat on the right side.

ERA protects its front and sides.

=== Armament ===
The VN20 vehicle was advertised with 2 different turrets:

1. The exhibit was fitted with 30mm autocannon RCWS, which also houses a coaxial machine gun and a missile launcher.
2. The catalogue video shows a 2-man turret which consists of a 100mm cannon and a 30mm autocannon similar to a BMP-3/ZBD-04. The turret also fits HJ-12 launchers and a smaller RCWS mounted on top. An early version was shown as a tabletop model in the UAE.

2 remote controlled 7.62mm machine guns can be mounted to the rear.
