= BMD-4 =

Russian infantry fighting vehicle

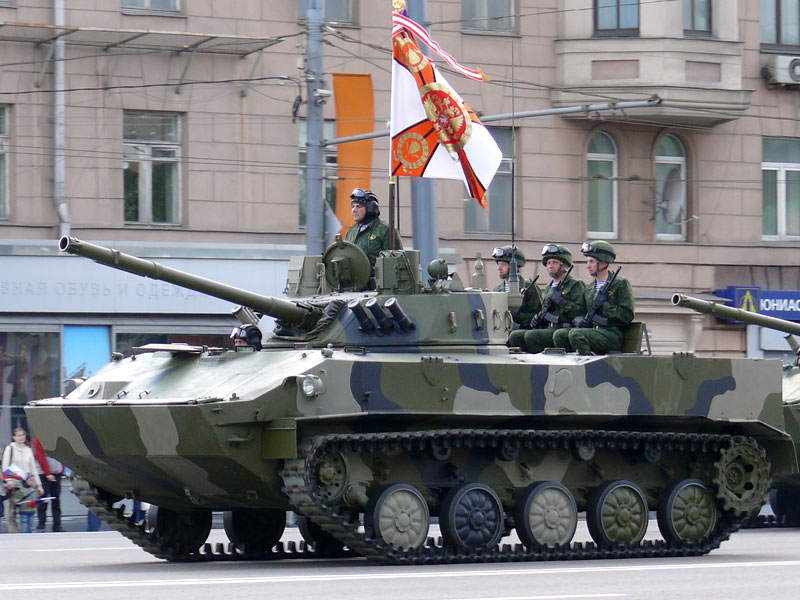
- A BMD-4 "Bakhcha-U" at the 2008 Moscow Victory Day Parade
- Type: Airborne Infantry fighting vehicle
- Place of origin: Russia

Service history
- In service: 2004–present
- Used by: Russia
- Wars: Russo-Ukrainian War

Production history
- Designed: 1990s
- Manufacturer: Volgograd tractor factory Kurganmashzavod (since April 2024)
- Produced: 2004–present
- Variants: See Variants

Specifications
- Mass: 13.6 t (15.0 short tons; 13.4 long tons)
- Length: 6.36 m (20 ft 10 in) (gun forward); 6.1 m (20 ft 0 in) (hull)
- Width: 3.11 m (10 ft 2 in)
- Height: 2.45 m (8 ft 0 in)
- Crew: 3
- Passengers: 5
- Armor: Turret: Steel; Hull: Aluminum alloy
- Main armament: Bakhcha-U/Sinitsa turret with 100 mm 2A70 cannon; 30 mm 2A72 autocannon; 9M113 Konkurs ATGM
- Secondary armament: 5.45 mm RPK-74 machine gun; 7.62 mm PKM machine gun
- Engine: BMD-4: 2V-06-2 water-cooled diesel engine BMD-4M: UTD-29 multi-fuel diesel engine BMD-4: 450 hp (331 kW); BMD-4M: 500 hp (368 kW)
- Power/weight: BMD-4: 33.1 hp/tonne (24.3 kW/tonne); BMD-4M: 37.0 hp/tonne (27.2 kW/tonne)
- Suspension: Hydropneumatic suspension
- Operational range: 500 km (310 mi) (on paved roads)
- Maximum speed: 70 km/h (43 mph) (on paved roads); 45 km/h (28 mph) (on rough terrain); 10 km/h (6.2 mph) (in water)

The BMD-4 (Russian: Боевая Машина Десанта-4, romanized: Boyevaya Mashina Desanta-4, lit. 'Combat Vehicle of the Airborne-4') is an amphibious infantry fighting vehicle (IFV) originating from post-Cold War Russia. Originally designated as the BMD-3M, the chassis of the BMD-4 is the same as that of the BMD-3 because it was developed on the same basis. This armored fighting vehicle is one of the lightest in its class, possessing a substantial amount of firepower. The vehicle was designed to transport Russian Airborne Troops (VDV), increasing its mobility, armament, and protection on the battlefield.

Many aspects of the vehicle, such as the ergonomics and positioning of the passengers, remain relatively unchanged. Primary differences between the BMD-4 and its predecessors lie in its armament. The vehicle is fitted with the Bakhcha-U turret, which consists of a 100 mm 2A70 low-pressure rifled gun, a 30 mm 2A72 coaxial autocannon, and a 7.62 mm PKT coaxial machine gun. The 2A70 rifled cannon is capable of firing high explosive fragmentation rounds and laser-guided anti-tank missiles. It also features secondary weapons designed to engage and destroy enemy infantry and armored fighting vehicles. The automated fire control system of the vehicle is advanced with new features that simplify the use of the vehicle's armament by the gunner and commander.

The vehicle is designed by the Volgograd tractor factory and the armament was developed by the KBP Instrument Design Bureau unitary enterprise located in Tula. Kurganmashzavod is the official manufacturer of the vehicle. The BMD-4 entered service in late 2004 and has been produced ever since then. In 2008, a modernized version, designated as the BMD-4M, was introduced with significant contributions from Kurganmashzavod, the designer of the BMP.

== Production ==
The BMD-4 was adopted by the Russian Armed Forces on December 31, 2004. In August 2005, the 106th Guards Airborne Division received the first batch of these vehicles, with 60 vehicles being produced. In 2010, all further purchases of the BMD-4 with the "Bakhcha-U" turret were cancelled along with the 2S25. It was later noted by Colonel Gennady Anashkin that the BMD-4 will still enter service due to the vehicle being a completely new generation essential for the VDV. VDV commander Vladimir Shamanov told in an interview that the original BMD-4 possessed an unreliable base while the modernized BMD-4M is more than satisfying for the Russian airborne troops.

On March 21, 2008, Kurganmashzavod unveiled a modernized variant of the vehicle that was designated as the BMD-4M. The primary cause of the alterations was due to the bankruptcy of the original manufacturer, the Volgograd tractor factory. In 2008, it was planned to carry out comprehensive testing of a modernized BMD-4 program agreed with the Chief Armor Management (Bolshoi) of the Ministry of Defense and the VDV. According to test results and Mikhail Bolotin, the president of Concern Tractor Plants (KTZ), mass production was initially planned for the following year. The mass production of the modernized BMD-4 was later postponed along with the 2S25 Sprut-SD. Nikolay Makarov, the Chief of the General Staff of Russian Armed Forces, dismissed the BMD-4 as "a version of the BMP-3" with no protection and costs more than an expensive tank.

In August 2012, Alexander Sukhorukov, who was then deputy Defense Minister, said that the BMD-4M armored vehicle does not meet the requirements put forward by the Russian military, and will not be purchased. At the same time, a week before, Vladimir Shamanov said the BMD-4M is fully compliant with the VDV, which was more important in this regard than the requirements of the Ministry of Defence. He stressed that the fate of the BMD-4M is decided by the Supreme Commander, Vladimir Putin. The Russian Army received another prototype batch of the modernised BMD-4M airborne assault vehicle during mid-2014. Eight modernized BMD-4M vehicles were delivered to the 106th Guards Airborne Assault Division by Kurganmashzavod, where the vehicles continued to undergo testing.

"The vehicles proved themselves as technology of the future: they roved in differing climatic conditions, airdropped, tested in water, including being redeployed at sea. All of this was noted by the commission, which recommended to supply the VDV [with the vehicles] this year as a result of testing", Maj. Gen. Andrei Kholzakov, deputy commander of VDV, said on January 15, 2015. Kholzakov added that the decision of the state commission came as field tests of BMD-4M airborne fighting vehicles and BTR-MD Rakushka armored personnel carriers concluded successfully in 2014. The BMD-4M, as well as the BTR-MDM, were officially brought into service in April 2016.

== Design ==
=== Hull ===
The hull of the BMD-4 bears a strong resemblance to the hull of the BMD-3 but with a number of innovations. The BMD-4 has a crew of three consisting of a vehicle commander, a gunner, and a driver. It can carry up to five passengers and is more spacious than the original BMD-1 and BMD-2. The suspension is composed of five small road wheels and four track rollers on each side. The vehicle has an automatic transmission with five gears for forward and five gears for backwards.

=== Armament ===
==== Primary ====
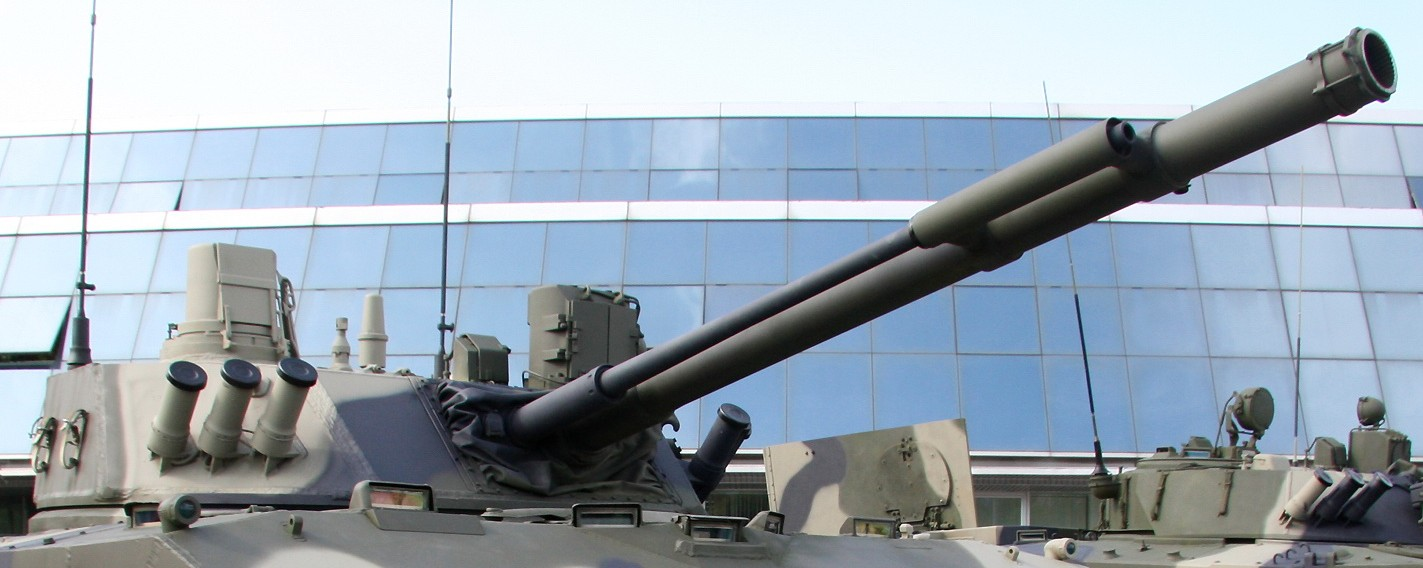
Close-up of the turret and the primary armament

Both primary armaments of the BMD-4 are fitted into one turret known as the Bakhcha-U (Russian: Бахча-У; "Melon field") consisting of: a 100 mm 2A70 rifled gun, a coaxial 30 mm 2A72 autocannon, and a coaxial 7.62 mm PKT machine gun. This module is designed by the KBP Instrument Design Bureau for motorized infantry units without the support of tanks and artillery. The Bakhcha-U turret is installable on the chassis of other military vehicles, such as the BMP-2, BMP-3, and BTR-90. This turret has a full 360° traverse and a maximum elevation of 60°; the maximum depression is −6°. The majority of armored and unarmored targets can be engaged by at least two types of armament provided by the Bakhcha-U turret.

The 2A70 rifled gun is capable of firing guided and unguided shells. 34 ready-to-use unguided HE-Frag shells are carried in the turret of the vehicle. The 100 mm gun is fitted with an autoloader that fires at a rate of 10-12 rounds per minute, with the time of each shell loading being 5–6 seconds. The two variants of HE-Frag shells available for the Bakhcha-U are the 3UOF17 and 3UOF19; the former having a muzzle velocity of 250 m/s with the latter achieving 355 m/s. The 3UOF19 also provides a substantially larger proximity detonation which increases the lethal radius of the explosion. When implemented in the Bakhcha-U turret, the range of the 2A70 is increased to 7 km with its unguided rounds.

A 30 mm 2A72 autocannon is mounted coaxially with the 2A70 rifled gun. The turret of the BMD-4 contains a total of 500 rounds ready to be used by its autocannon with 245 of them being high explosive and the remaining being armor-piercing discarding sabot. This autocannon fires projectiles with a muzzle velocity of 1120 m/s and a cyclic rate of fire of 350–400 rds/min. The rounds fired can penetrate 22 mm of Rolled homogeneous armor (RHA) from a range of 2000 m while impacting at an angle of 60°. Minimum gas contamination of the turret is achieved by a delayed unlocking due to single-barrel long recoil action and forward case ejection. The 7.62 mm PKT machine gun is mounted coaxially with 100 mm and 30 mm weapons. 2000 rounds are carried in the turret for the PKT machine gun; all combined into one belt to eliminate reloading.

The 100 mm tank gun is also capable of firing the 9M117M1 Arkan anti-tank guided missile (ATGM) which is a further development of the 9M117 Bastion (NATO reporting name: AT-10 Stabber). With a weight of 21.5 kg, this ATGM has a penetration value of 750–800 mm of RHA behind explosive reactive armor (ERA). The turret holds four 9M117M1 missiles and is launched through the 100 mm gun ensuring a crucial advantage due to the loading being completely internal rather than external unlike other infantry fighting vehicles. While traveling at an average speed of 300 m/s, the Arkan is guided via laser beam riding and is capable of destroying targets up to 5.5 km away.

==== Secondary ====
As one of the most heavily armed IFVs, the BMD-4 possesses multiple secondary armaments. These secondary weapons include a 7.62 mm PKT machine gun, and a 9P135M launcher post capable of firing additional anti tank missiles. The PKT is operated by passenger seated towards the front and bow mounted towards the left. This bow mounted weapon is dismountable and man portable for increased versatility. The 9P135M missile launcher is mounted towards the roof and is also dismountable.

The RPK-74 is bow mounted towards the right side of the vehicle. It has a maximum range of 800 m and fires 5.45×39mm rounds which are also used by the standard AK-74 Kalashnikov in service with the Russian armed forces.

Additional ATGMs can be operated by the BMD-4. This is made possible by the 9P135M launcher post that fires the wire guided Fagot (NATO reporting name: AT-4 Spigot) and Konkurs (NATO reporting name: AT-5 Spandrel) missiles. The Fagot missile is a short range ATGM with an effective range of 2 km. While flying at an average speed of 186 m/s, it penetrates 480 mm of RHA. The Fagot-M is an improved variant that has an increased effective range of 2.5 km and a penetration of 550 mm of RHA. The Konkurs missile has an effective range of 4000 m and flies at an average speed of 206 m/s. The original Konkurs missile penetrates 750–800 mm of RHA while the improved Konkurs-M penetrates 750–800 mm of RHA after ERA due to an additional tandem warhead. The firing range is reduced to 2500 m during night time.

=== Protection ===
The weight of the BMD-4 is achieved by using aluminum alloy for the hull instead of steel as armor. This armor protects the BMD-4 from 30 mm weapons like its own 2A72 autocannon towards the front, and small arms fire and shell splinters towards the side. To counter infrared guidance and weapons, six 81 mm ZD6 smoke grenade dischargers in two banks of three are mounted towards the sides of the turret. An NBC protection system and automatic fire suppression systems are provided to the entire crew and passengers to ensure survivability in an environment with nuclear fallout.

=== Fire control system and sensors ===
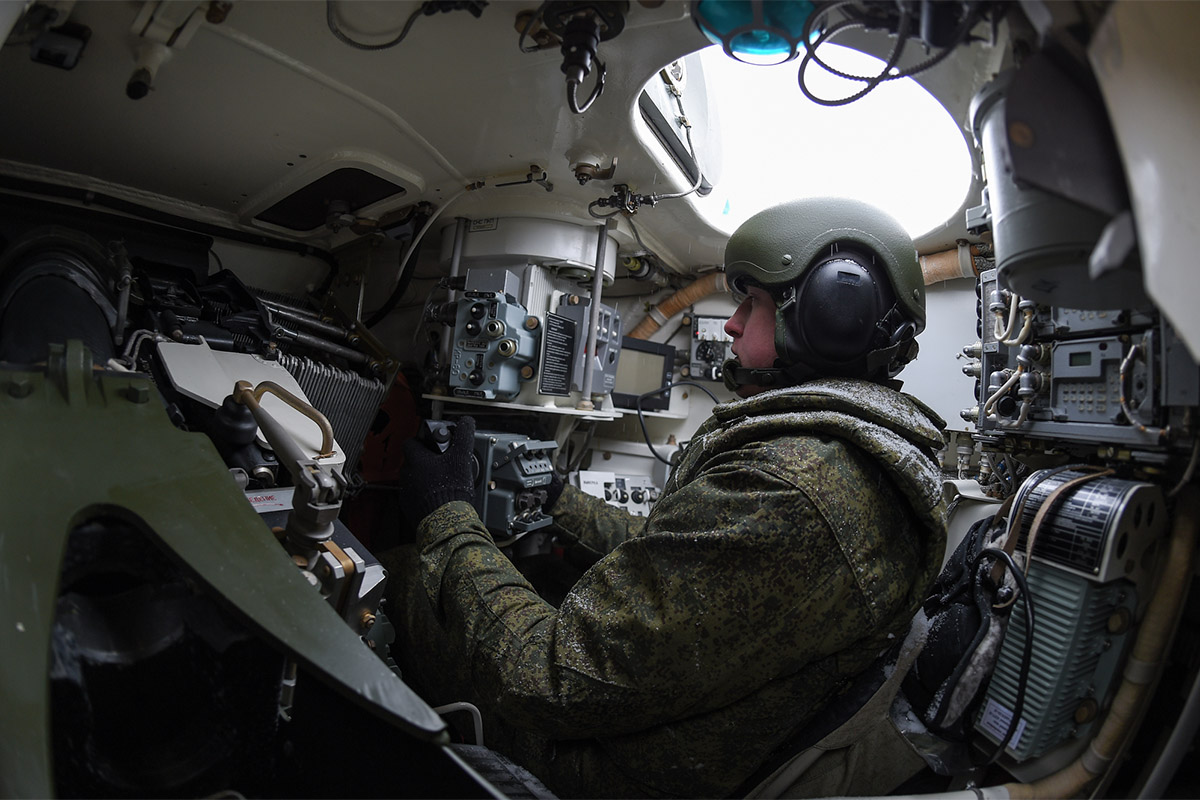
The commander's station.

The BMD-4 features an advanced fire control system (FCS). The unique armament system provided by the Bakhcha-U and the reliable ride performance provided by the chassis gives the BMD-4 qualitatively new capabilities to units of land forces. The BMD-4 is able to fire all its primary armaments effectively regardless of whether the vehicle is stationary or mobile, whether the time is day or night, or whether it is afloat or land based. The FCS implements a significant increase of the armament effectiveness by engaging a wide scope of targets in complicated weather and landscape conditions. Advanced ballistic calculations allow the BMD-4 to fire from an enclosed position and the capability of effectively firing at low and slow aerial targets is provided.

The computerized FCS of the BMD-4 is automated by day and night and features two advanced optical sights for both the commander and gunner. The IFV commander's panoramic sight has an azimuth coverage of 360° to search for targets. This panoramic sight features thermal imaging and range finding channels with a range of up to 10 km. The gunner's sight provides for firing all types of armament by day and night with a range finding sight of 10 km. This sight is combined with visual imaging, thermal imaging, range-finding channels, and a missile guidance channel. With two dedicated sights for both operators of the Bakhcha-U, the BMD-4 has hunter-killer capabilities and the gunner is able to use the commander's sight to engage targets if his own sight is disabled or destroyed. The commander of the vehicle also has the ability to override the command and to take control of the turret and gun from the gunner with both turret operators having complete control of the armaments.

=== Mobility ===
Like its predecessor, the BMD-4 is capable of parachuting from aircraft with the entire crew and passengers inside the vehicle which allows target engagement after landing to be instant. An Il-76 is able to transport two of these vehicles at a time in comparison to three BMD-1s and BMD-2s. Its engine is the 2V-06-2; the same as the BMD-3. This engine develops a total power of 450 horsepower (hp). The BMD-4 is also fully amphibious with two water jets mounted on each side of the back of the hull and can swim at speeds of up to 10 km/h in a Beaufort scale of 2. With a high power-to-weight ratio, the BMD-4 features superior acceleration in comparison to other infantry fighting vehicles. The maximum speed on a highway is 70 km/h and the BMD-4 can maneuver on a 60° gradient and a 35° side slope. The BMD-4 can cross 1.8 m trenches and climb 0.8 m tall obstacles. This vehicle's suspension is hydropneumatic giving an adjustable ground clearing of 130–530 mm with the normal road clearance being 450 mm. The clearance is changed by the driver and can be changed within 10 seconds.

== Operational history ==
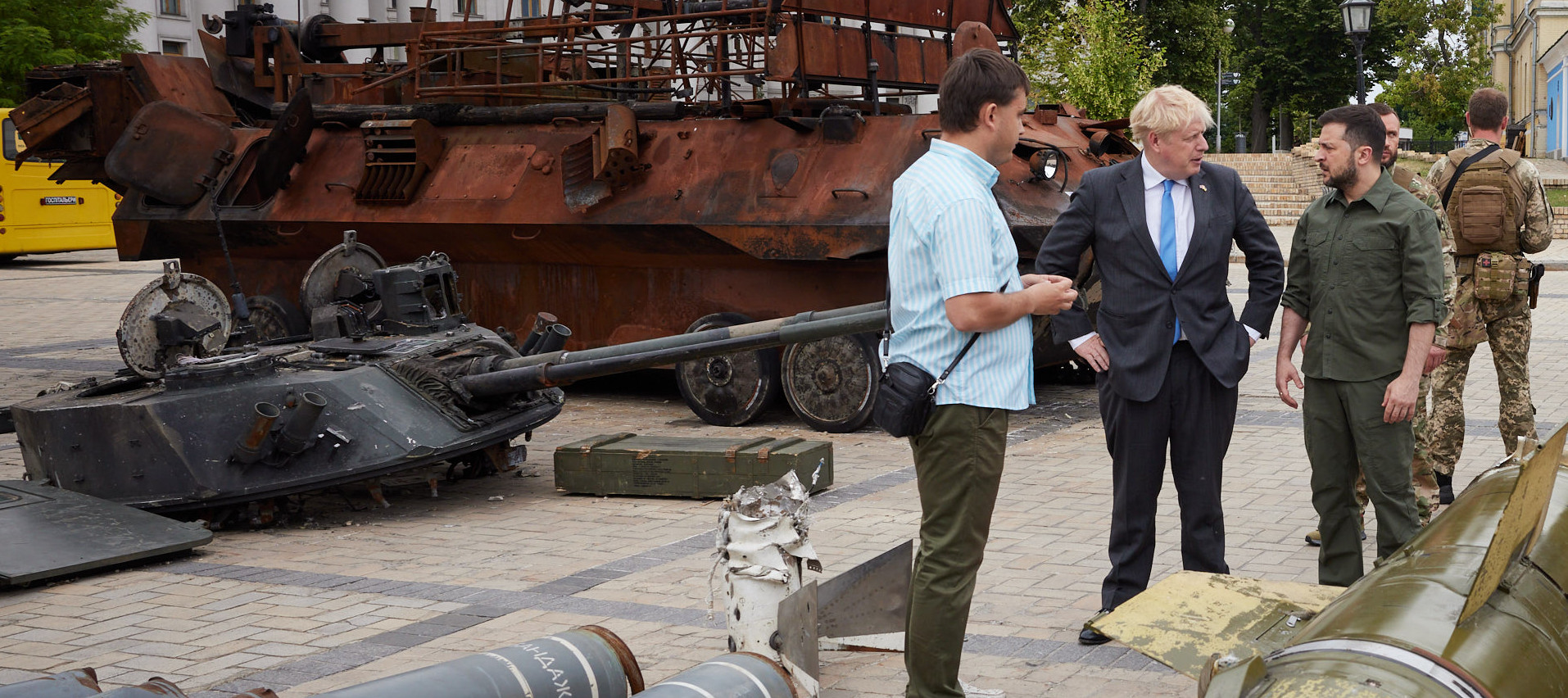
Turret from a BMD-4 destroyed in the Russo-Ukrainian War displayed in Kyiv, Ukraine.

The first production batch of the new BMD-4M and BTR-MDM "Rakushka" armoured vehicles, comprising 24 units (12 each) was transferred to the Russian Airborne Troops on March 3, 2015. The Russian Defense Ministry is to receive more than 250 airborne troops’ BMD-4M combat vehicles and BTR-MDM Rakushka armored personnel carriers over three years under a contract. 33 BMD-4Ms were delivered in the first half of 2016. 31 BMD-4Ms and 12 BTR-MDMs were delivered in the second half of 2016. In total, 60 BMD-4Ms and BTR-MDMs were delivered in 2016. 10 BMD-4M and 15 BTR-MDM delivered in early 2017. About 50 BMD-4Ms and BTR-MDMs were delivered in April 2017, with about another 50 BMD-4Ms and BTR-MDMs in August 2017. There was a new delivery in early 2018. The Russian Defense Ministry and the Shipunov Design Bureau have signed a contract for delivering 190 BMD-4M airborne infantry fighting vehicles and BTR-MDM Rakushka APCs to the Russian Airborne Troops in 2018–2020. A total of 132 airborne infantry fighting vehicles BMD-4M and 58 BTR-MDM Rakushka armored personnel carriers will be delivered before 2020. 31 BMD-4Ms and 8 BTR-MDMs were delivered in March 2019. Russian MoD received 42 BMD-4M AIFVs from Kurganmashzavod plant in July 2019. The seventh battalion set of military hardware for the Pskov paratroopers was transferred with 31 BMD-4M and eight BTR-MDM ‘Rakushka’ in January 2020 and another four each including about 40 BMD-4M and BTR-MDM were delivered in June and November 2020 and June and July 2021. Additional vehicles were delivered in 2022 and in 2024.

=== Russo-Ukrainian War ===
Russia has employed the BMD-4 family of vehicles, including BMD-4M, BMD-4M Obr. 2024 and BTR-MDM "Rakushka", in the Russo-Ukrainian War. As of 25 March 2026, according to Oryx, Russia has lost at least 178 BMD-4M (150 destroyed, 5 damaged, 12 abandoned, 11 captured), 4 BMD-4M Obr. 2024 (4 Destroyed) and 52 BTR-MDM Rakushka (39 destroyed, 3 damaged, 2 abandoned, 8 captured) and four vehicles identified as either BMD-3 or BMD-4s. BMD-4s were used alongside older BMD family vehicles in the Battle of Hostomel Airport, and some have been seen destroyed there.

== Variants ==
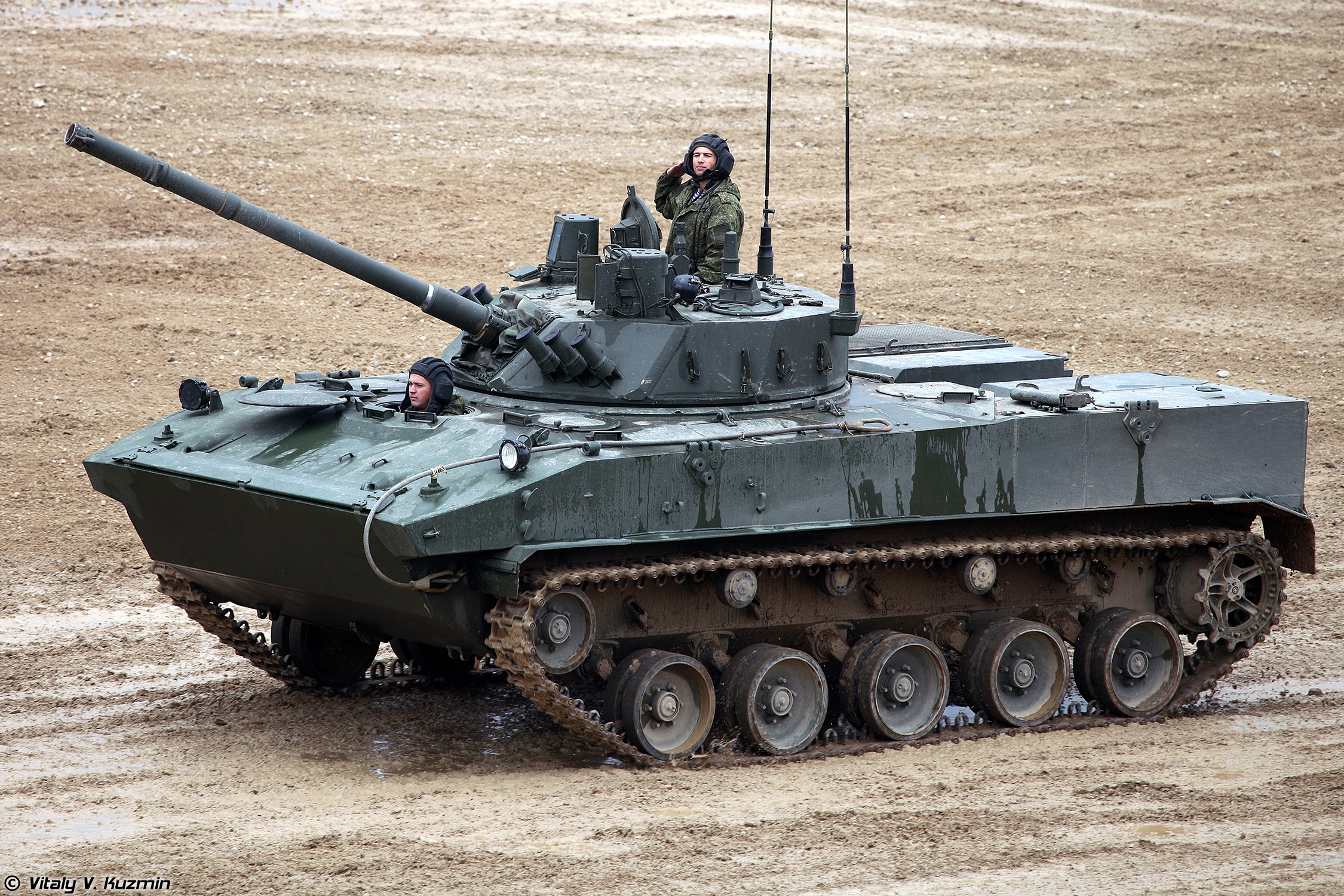
BMD-4M with additional protection.

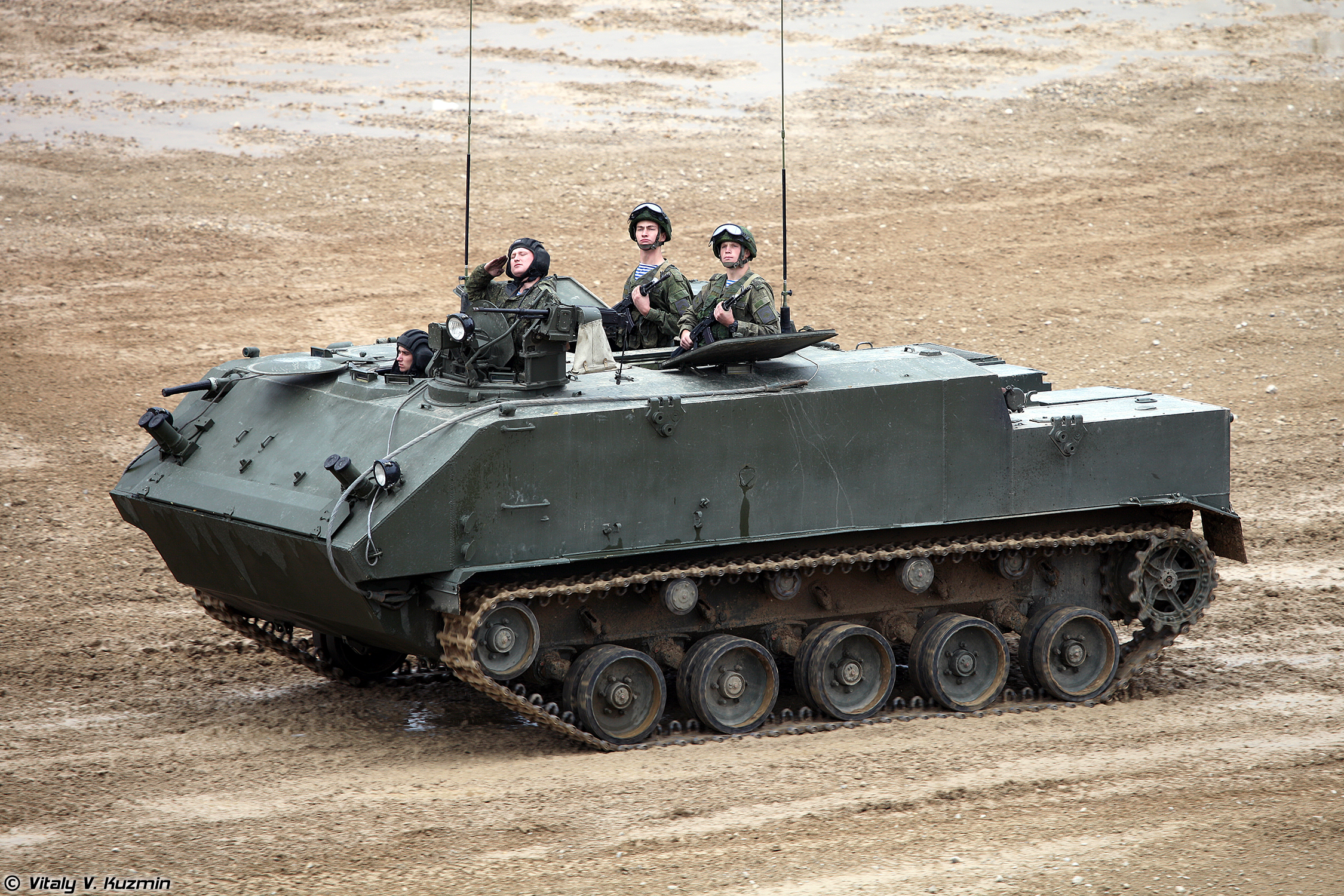
BTR-MDM

- BMD-4K – The commander variant featuring an additional radio station.
- 2S25 Sprut-SD – a tank destroyer with 2A75 anti-tank gun.
  - A new order for 2S25 replacement 125 mm tracked self-propelled guns were made in 2013. These tank destroyers are made using the chassis of the BMD-4 with the turret being replaced by the 2A46M-5 125 mm gun; the same smoothbore gun used on the T-90.

=== BMD-4M ===
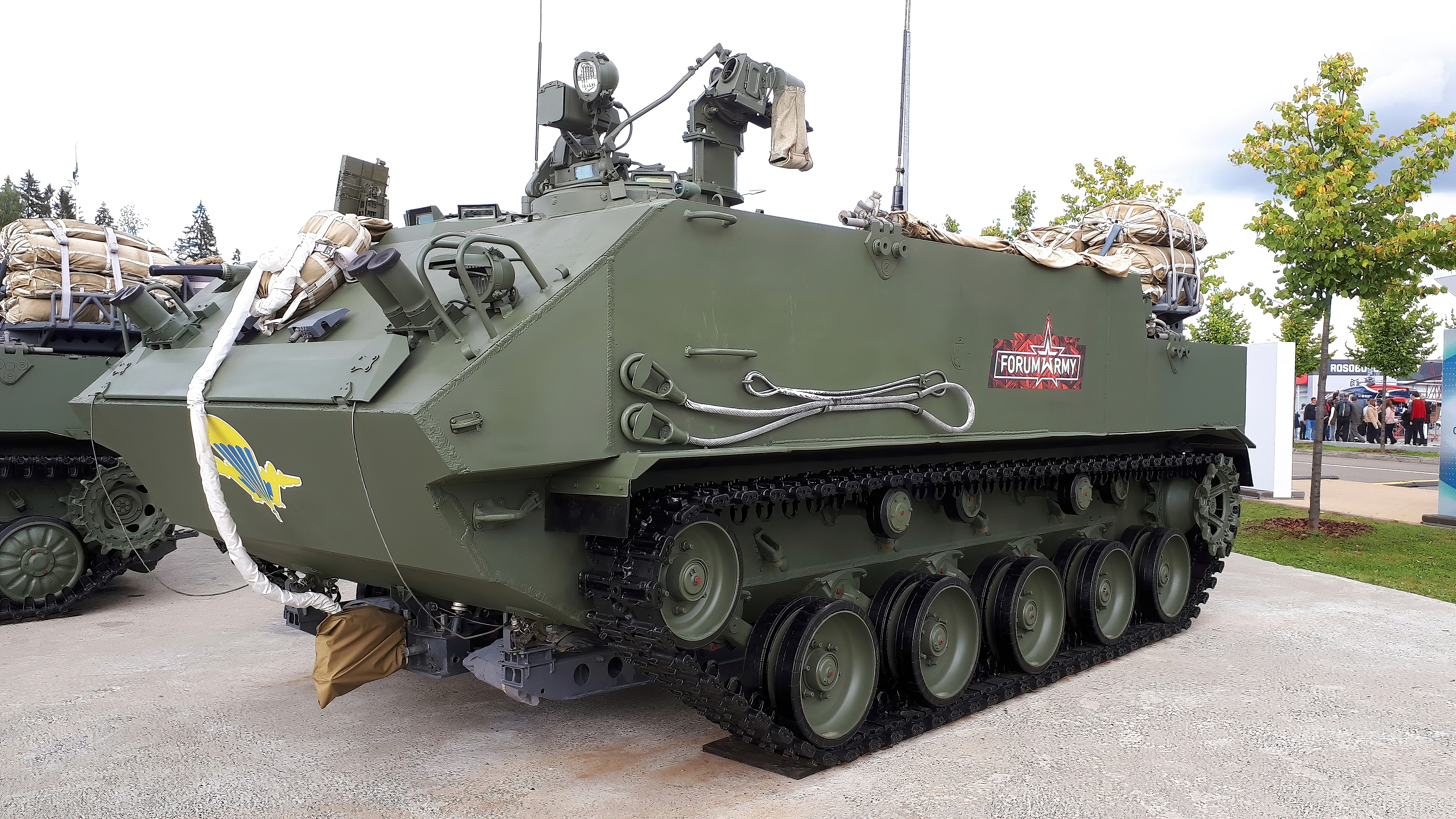
Armored personnel carrier based on BMD-4M

The BMD-4M was unveiled by Kurganmashzavod in 2008. This vehicle retains the Bakhcha-U turret with a number of other innovations. Special lightweight and durable alloys make this possible without the vehicle losing its ability to swim or be airdropped. The more powerful and compact engine of the BMP-3 is integrated into the BMD-4M; providing 500 hp. In general, the unification of units, plants, and systems of the modernized BMD-4 chassis with the same units, plants and systems of BMP-3 is 80%. This decreases the expenses of the airborne assault vehicle servicing in the army allowing a significant reduction of service maintenance of airborne combat vehicles in the army.

- BMD-4M Obr. 2024 – An upgraded version with enhanced protection, including cage armor and electronic warfare systems to counter drones.
- BMD-4M Sinitsa

The BMD-4M Sinitsa was unveiled in 2017. This vehicle has the Sinitsa turret combat module fitted with a top-mounted panoramic sight with a thermal imaging channel and housing a 100 mm 2A70 tank gun/ATGM launcher, 30 mm 2A72 autocannon and a 7.62mm PKMS medium machine gun. The original power unit and transmission system are changed to the parts used in the BMP-3 to standardise production and spare parts supply.

- BTR-MDM Rakushka – A armored personnel carrier based on BMD-4M. It can carry 3 crew and 12 troops.
- 2S42 Lotus – A self-propelled 120 mm mortar based on BMD-4M.
- Ptitselov – A self-propelled airdroppable SAM system with twelve 9M337 missiles based on BMD-4M.
- Kornet-D1

In January 2019, the Russian MoD announced it would begin state trials of the 9P163 Kornet-D1 anti-tank missile system, a version of the BMD-4M chassis modified to fire Kornet ATGMs. In service since January 2024.

== Operators ==
Russia – As of 2024, Russia is estimated to operate around 200 BMD-4M and 90 BTR-MDM vehicles. Prior to the 2022 Russian invasion of Ukraine, Russia operated 351 BMD-4 and 122 BTR-MDM. As of 21 February 2025, Russia is visually confirmed to have lost at least 167 BMD-4M and 48 BTR-MDM in the War in Ukraine.

- Russian airborne troops – 16 Battalion kits (1 kit – 31 BMD-4M and 16 BTR-MDM) + a small amount in the training units:
  - The first 17 serial BMD-4Ms and 12 BTR-MDMs were delivered in 2015 to the Ryazan Airborne Command School.
  - Rotary kit of BMD-4M (ten machines) received the 242nd Airborne Training Center in Omsk

=== Potential operators ===
China – Allegedly according to some 800 pages of seemingly genuine leaked documents analyzed by RUSI, Russia in 2023 agreed to supply China with equipment to outfit an airborne assault battalion, as well as Dalnolyot parachute systems, Orlan-10 drones and 1V119 airborne artillery command and observation systems. Along with the equipment, Russia will also begin training Chinese troops on the operation of the provided equipment and establish center for maintenance and repair of equipment for which all technical documents will be transferred-allowing the People's Liberation Army to undertake production and modernization of the equipment provided. Among the equipment to be provided are: 37 BMD-4M infantry fighting vehicles, 11 BTR-MDM Rakushka armored personnel carriers and 11 2S25 Sprut-SDM1 self-propelled anti-tank guns. All vehicles provided will be equipped with Chinese communication and command and control suites, as well as being electromagnetically compatible with Russian electronics. Software and hardware has been made compatible for Chinese rounds and munitions.

== See also ==
- 2S25 Sprut-SD – Russian self-propelled tank destroyer
- BMP-3 – Soviet/Russian infantry fighting vehicle
- BMPT – Russian armored fighting vehicle
- BTR-80 – Soviet armored personnel carrier
- T-90 – Russian third-generation main battle tank
- K21 – (South Korea)
- Combat Vehicle 90 – (Sweden)
- Makran IFV – (Iran)
- M2 Bradley – (United States)
- Expeditionary Fighting Vehicle – (United States)
- Puma – (Germany)
- Tulpar – (Turkey)
- T-15 Armata – (Russia)
- ZBD-03 – (China)
- ZBD-04 – (China)
- ZBD-05 – (China)
- Type 89 – (Japan)
