= 2008 Moscow Victory Day Parade =

Russian military parade

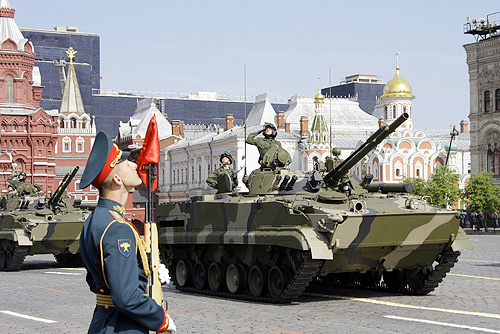
BMP-3 at the parade repetition.

The 2008 Moscow Victory Day Parade was held on Victory Day on the occasion of the 63rd anniversary of the Great Patriotic War ending in the defeat of Nazi Germany. This was the first time the Russian Federation opened its vehicle showcase since 1991, and the airshow since the Cold War. The parade was commanded by Army General Vladimir Bakin, Commander of the Moscow Military District, and reviewed by Anatoliy Serdyukov of the Russian Ministry of Defence. A speech was made by Russian president Dmitry Medvedev, who took office just two days prior. This would be notable to be the first ever major Russian military parade seen on television worldwide when RT carried a live broadcast of the parade for the first time in its history.

== Parade Program ==
=== Parade formations ===
Note: Those indicated in bold indicate first parade appearance, those indicated with italic indicate double or multiple parade appearances.

- General of the Army Vladimir Bakin, Commander of the Moscow Military District (parade commander)
- Defense Minister of the Russian Federation Anatoliy Serdyukov (parade inspector)

==== Military Bands in Attendance ====
- Massed Military Bands led and conducted by Major General Valery Khalilov and composed of:
  - Headquarters Band of the Moscow Military District
  - Central Military Band of the MDRF
  - Central Band of the Russian Navy
  - Band of the Moscow Military Conservatoire, Military University of the Ministry of Defense of the Russian Federation
  - HQ Band of the Ministry of Emergency Situations of the Russian Federation
- Corps of Drums of the Moscow Military Music College

==== Infantry Column ====
- 154th Moscow Garrison Commandant's Honor Guard Regiment and Color Guards
  - Colors Party composed of:
    - Flag of Russia
    - Victory Banner
    - Banner of the Armed Forces of the Russian Federation
  - Combined Honor Guard Company of the Armed Forces
- Historical units
- Representative units of the Armed Forces, Ministry of Internal Affairs, Ministry of Emergency Situations and Civil Defense, Federal Security Service as well as units of the Moscow Military District
  - Combined Arms Academy of the Armed Forces of the Russian Federation
  - Peter the Great Military Academy of the Strategic Missile Forces
  - Military University of the Ministry of Defense of the Russian Federation
  - Gagarin Air Force Academy
  - Zhukovsky Air Force Engineering Academy
  - Civil Defense Academy of the Ministry of Emergency Situations of the Russian Federation
  - Military Technological University
  - Moscow Military Space Institute of Radio Electronics
  - Moscow Border Guards Institute of the Border Guard Service of the Federal Security Service of the Russian Federation "Moscow City Council"
  - 2nd Guards Motor Rifle Division
  - 4th Kantemir Guards Armored Brigade "Yuri Andropov"
  - 27th Sevastopol Guards Motor Rifle Brigade
  - Ryazan Airborne Command Academy "Gen. of the Army Vasily Margelov"
  - 98th Guards Airborne Division
  - ODON Ind. Motorized Internal Troops Division of the Ministry of Internal Affairs of the Russian Federation "Felix Dzerzhinsky"
  - Baltic Naval Military Institute "Admiral Fyodor Ushakov"
  - 336th Separate Bialystok Guards Naval Infantry Brigade of the Baltic Fleet
  - Nakhimov Naval School
  - Suvorov Military School
  - Moscow Military Commanders Training School "Supreme Soviet of the RSFSR/Russian Federation"

With more than 9,000 soldier, sailors, and airmen and 100 vehicles marching in the parade, this was the largest such parade held in Russia since the fall of the Soviet Union. Unlike previous Victory Day parades, there were no units parading in Great Patriotic War uniforms, though the Victory Banner was paraded at the beginning of the ceremony. Training for the parade took two months in Alabino, Moscow Oblast. On 8 May, a temporary platform with a white-blue-red banner was erected on Red Square, covering the Lenin Mausoleum .

==== Ground vehicles at the Parade ====
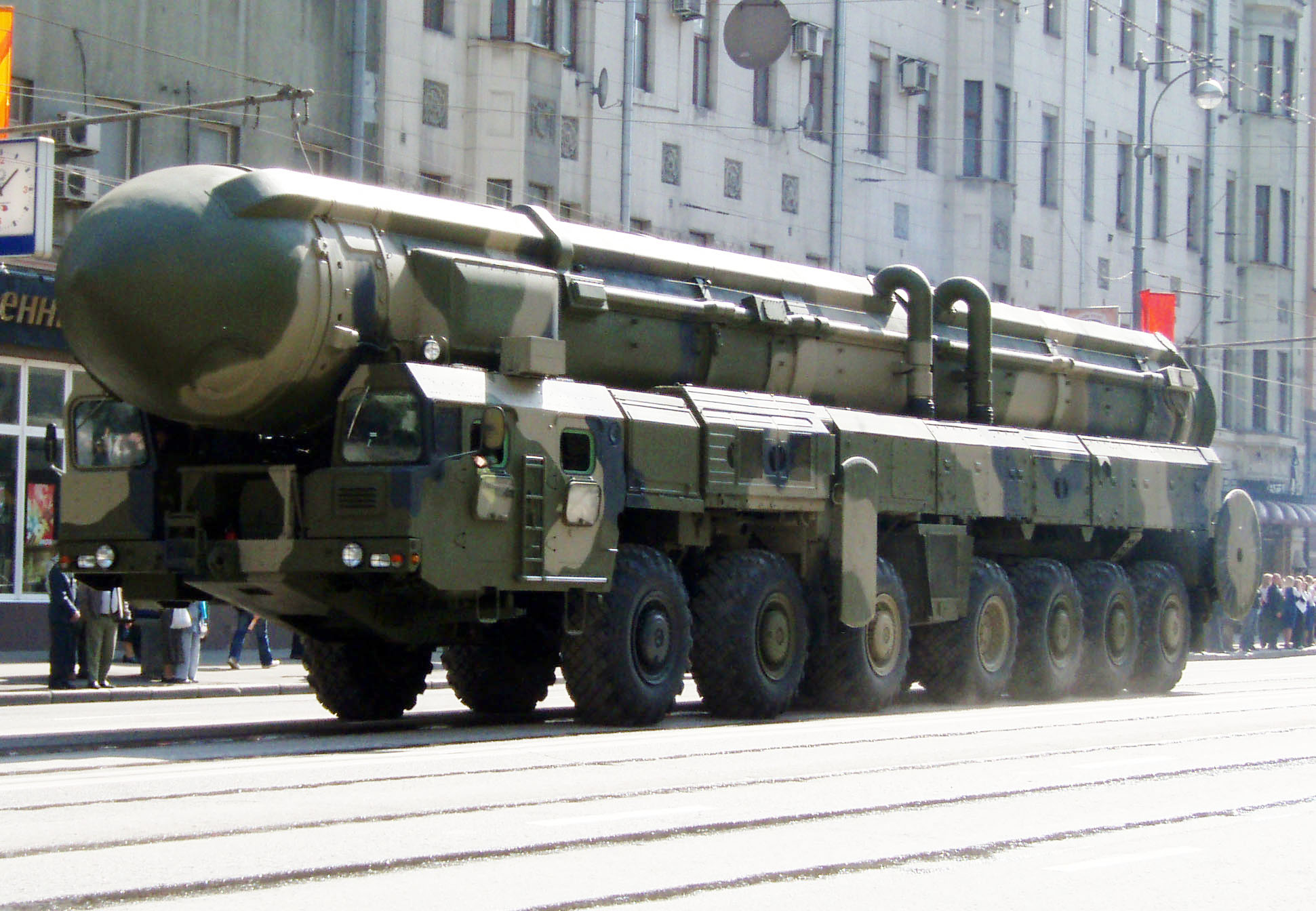
Topol at the parade rehearsal held on 5 May 2008.

This was the first time in the history of post-Soviet Russia when armoured fighting vehicles took part in the Red Square parade. In order of presentation:

- Advanced guard flag group by three UAZ-469s
- GAZ-2975
- BTR-80
- BMP-3
- BMD-4
- 2S25 Sprut-SD
- T-90
- 2S19 Msta
- 9K22 Tunguska
- Tor Missile System
- Buk-M1-2
- BM-30 Smerch
- S-300
- Iskander M
- RT-2PM Topol
- Rear guard flag group by three UAZ-469s

On 22 April, the equipment was delivered to a training ground near Moscow. Before the parade, the tracked vehicles were delivered by rail. Due to the fact that in 1995 the Resurrection Gates were restored, military equipment entered the square on from one side of the State Historical Museum, and not from two as in previous parades.

==== Aircraft at the Parade ====
Aircraft of the Russian Air Force performing a fly-over at the Victory Day parade in May 2008.

In order of presentation:

- 3 Mil Mi-8 (with flags)
- Antonov An-124 and 2 Sukhoi Su-27
- Tupolev Tu-160 and 2 Mikoyan MiG-31
- Tupolev Tu-95, Ilyushin Il-78 and 2 Mikoyan MiG-29 (Il-78 and Tu-95 were imitating aerial refueling)
- Ilyushin Il-78, Sukhoi Su-24, Sukhoi Su-34, also imitating aerial refueling. The Su-34s came from the 4th Centre for Combat Employment and Retraining of Personnel at Lipetsk air base.
- 3 Tupolev Tu-22M
- 4 Sukhoi Su-25
- 5 Sukhoi Su-27 and 4 Mikoyan MiG-29 (Russian Knights and Strizhi)

== Music ==
Inspection and Address

- March of the Preobrazhensky Regiment (Марш Преображенского Полка)
- Slow March of the Tankmen (Встречный Марш Танкистов) by Semyon Tchernetsky
- Slow March to Carry the War Flag (Встречный Марш для выноса Боевого Знамени) by Dmitriy Valentinovich Kadeyev
- Slow March of the Guards of the Navy (Гвардейский Встречный Марш Военно-Морского Флота) by Nikolai Pavlocich Ivanov-Radkevich
- Slow March of the Officers Schools (Встречный Марш офицерских училищ) by Semyon Tchernetsky
- Slow March (Встречный Марш) by Dmitry Pertsev
- Slow March of the Red Army (Встречный Марш Красной Армии) by Semyon Tchernetsky
- Slow March (Встречный Марш) by Evgeny Aksyonov
- Glory (Славься) by Mikhail Glinka
- Parade Fanfare All Listen! (Парадная Фанфара "Слушайте все!") by Andrei Golovin
- State Anthem of the Russian Federation (Государственный Гимн Российской Федерации) by Alexander Alexandrov
- Signal Retreat (Сигнал "Отбой")

Infantry Column

- General Miloradovich (Марш "Генерал Милорадович") by Valery Khalilov
- Farewell of Slavianka (Прощание Славянки) by Vasiliy Agapkin
- To Serve Russia (Служить России) by Eduard Cemyonovich Khanok
- Lefort's March (Лефортовский Марш) by Valery Khalilov
- Artillery March (Марш Артиллеристов) by Tikhon Khrennikov
- Combat March (Строевой Марш) by Dmitry Illarionovich Pertsev
- Air March (Авиамарш) by Yuliy Abramovich Khait
- In Defense of the Homeland (В защиту Родины) by Viktor Sergeyevich Runov
- March of the Cosmonauts/Friends, I believe (Марш Космонавтов /Я верю, друзья) by Oskar Borisovich Feltsman
- March Kant (Марш "Кант") by Valery Khalilov
- On Guard for the Peace (На страже Мира) by Boris Alexandrovich Diev
- We Need One Victory (Нам Нужна Одна Победа) by Bulat Shalvovich Okudzhava
- March Hero (Марш "Герой")
- We are the Army of the People (Мы Армия Народа) by Georgy Viktorovich Mavsesya
- Crew is One Family (Экипаж - одна семья) by Viktor Vasilyevich Pleshak
- On the Road (В Путь) by Vasily Pavlovich Solovyov-Sedoy
- Victory Day (День Победы) by David Fyodorovich Tukhmanov

Mobile Column

- General Miloradovich (Марш "Генерал Милорадович") by Valery Khalilov
- Triumph of the Winners (Триумф Победителей)
- "Katyusha" (Катюша) by Matvey Blanter
- March Victory (Марш «Победа») by Albert Mikhailovich Arutyunov
- Ballad of a Soldier (Баллада о Солдате) by Vasily Pavlovich Solovyov-Sedoy

Flypast Column

- Air March (Авиамарш) by Yuliy Abramovich Khait
- March Airplanes – First of all (Марш "Первым делом самолёты") by Vasili-Solovyov-Sedoi
- Air March (Авиамарш) by Yuliy Abramovich Khait

Conclusion

- Long Live our State (Да здравствует наша держава) by Boris Alexandrov
- Song of the Russian Army (Песня о Российской Армии) by Alexander Alexandrov

== Criticism ==
The parade has been criticized for returning to the Cold War-like display of weapons. Upon receiving personal criticism, Prime Minister Vladimir Putin stated the following: "This is not saber-rattling. We do not threaten anyone and are not going to do this, we do not impose anything on anyone". The military also allocated more than 1.3 billion rubles to the parade, many of which included the stones and asphalt concrete pavement for the mobile column, which came under criticism by opposition sources as well.
