= ZBD-04 =

Chinese infantry fighting vehicle

ZBD-04 Type 04 IFV
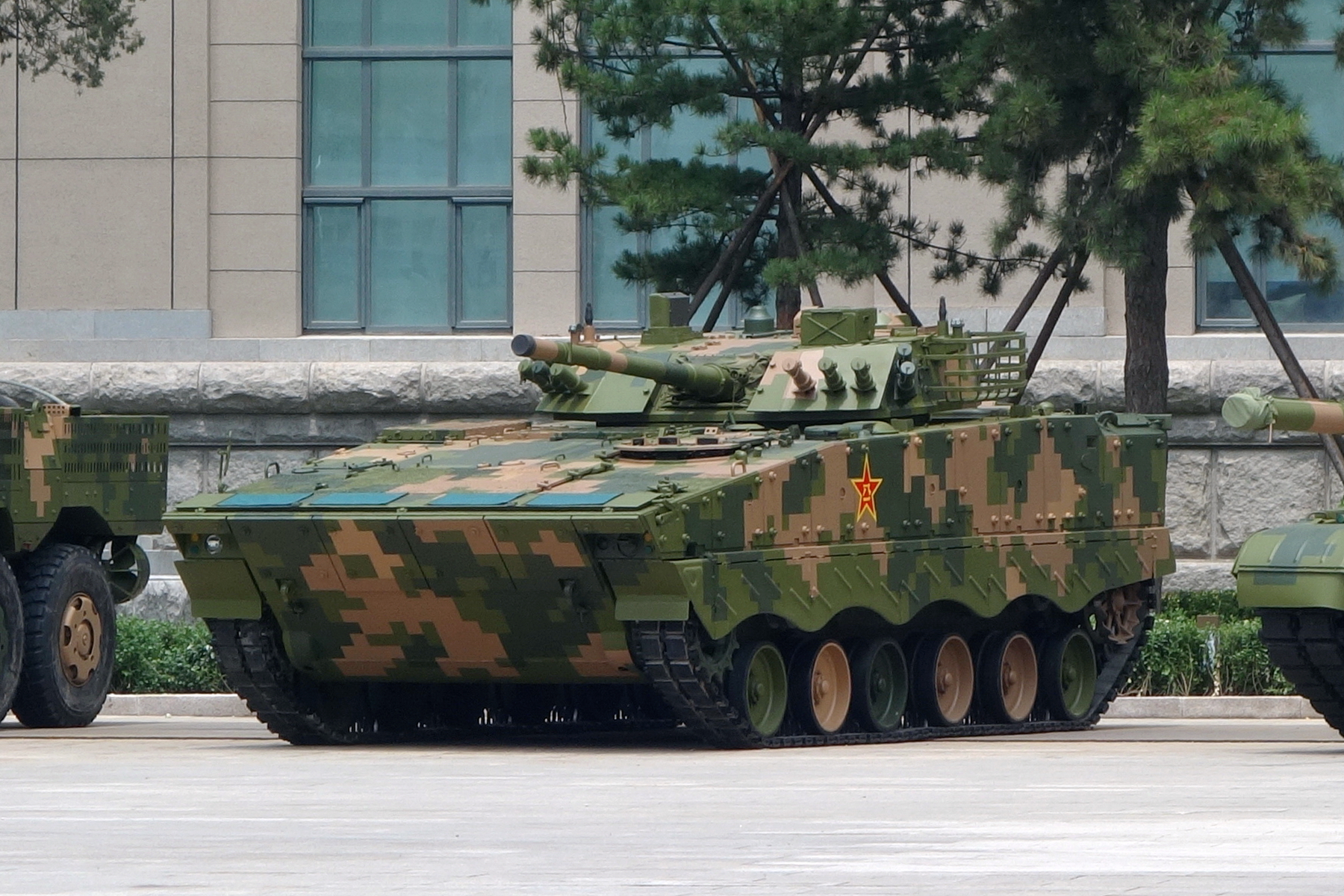
- ZBD-04A at Theme Exhibition of the 90th Anniversary of Chinese People's Liberation Army.
- Type: Infantry fighting vehicle
- Place of origin: China

Service history
- In service: 1999–present

Production history
- Designed: 1990s
- Produced: 1997–present
- No. built: 3,475+
- Variants: ZBD-04; ZBD-04A; AFT-10 Launcher

Specifications
- Mass: ZBD-04: 20 t (22 short tons; 20 long tons); ZBD-04A: 24 t (26 short tons; 24 long tons)
- Length: 7.2 m (23 ft 7 in)
- Width: 3.2 m (10 ft 6 in)
- Height: 2.5 m (8 ft 2 in)
- Crew: 3
- Passengers: 7
- Armor: Welded steel (ZBD-04); Appliqué armor (ZBD-04A); Explosive reactive armor (VN-12)
- Main armament: 100 mm rifled gun similar to 2A70; ZPT-99 30 mm autocannon
- Secondary armament: Type 86 7.62 mm or QJT-88 5.8mm coaxial machine gun 4 × HJ-8 or HJ-10 anti-tank missiles (ZBD-04 AT or ZBD-04A AT)
- Engine: ZBD-04: Type 6V150 diesel 440 kilowatts (590 hp); ZBD-04A:Type 6V150 diesel 670 horsepower (500 kW)
- Suspension: Torsion bar
- Operational range: 500 km (310 mi)
- Maximum speed: ZBD-04: 65 km/h (40 mph) (road); 20 km/h (12 mph; 11 kn) (water) ZBD-04A: 75 km/h (47 mph) (road); 6–8 km/h (3.7–5.0 mph; 3.2–4.3 kn) (water)

The ZBD-04 or Type 04 (industrial designation WZ502) is a Chinese infantry fighting vehicle. It bears some external resemblance to the BMP-3, particularly with regard to its turret and main armament; However, the chassis and internal subsystem possess a different layout. The earliest prototypes received the designation ZBD-97. An improved version, ZBD-04A, is the vehicle currently in service and being produced.

== Development ==
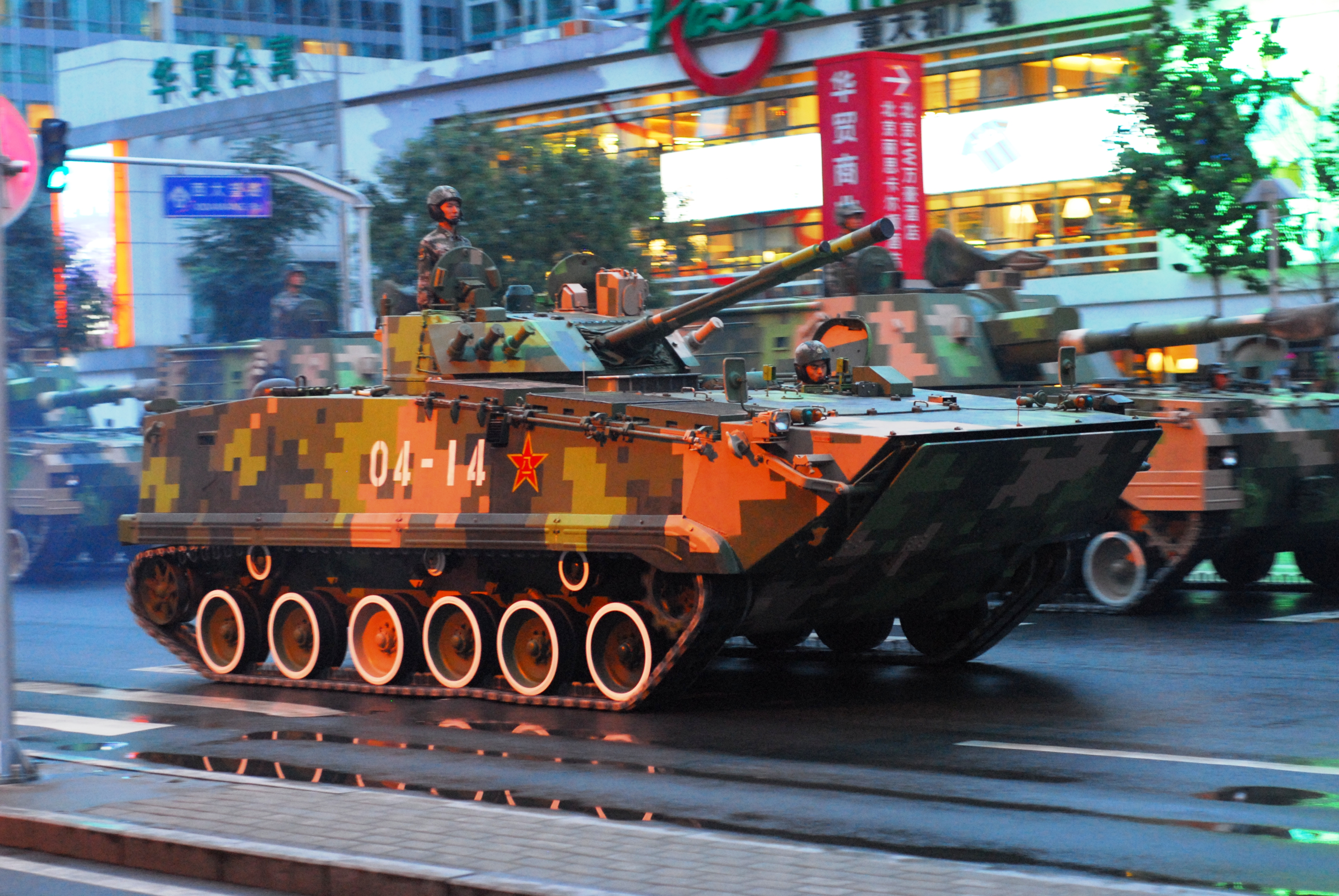
A ZBD-04 IFV during China's 60th anniversary military parade.

The ZBD-97/ZBD-04 was designed as the successor to the ZBD-86 and has been in service with the People's Liberation Army ground forces since 1999, in the armored units of the Guangzhou and Nanjing military regions. Besides the infantry fighting vehicle (IFV) variant, an armored recovery vehicle (ARV) variant is also available. A further improved variant is known as the ZBD-04A.

In 1996, China imported the technologies of BMP-3M turret and weapon systems with licenses from Russia. After testing, the Chinese military decided to fit the imported weapon systems with indigenously developed turrets, sensors, and chassis. The night vision system of the BMP-3M with an IR searchlight was deemed outdated and was replaced by a day/night thermal sight. Laser warning receivers, independent thermal viewers for the commander, and meteorological sensor systems were installed. ZBD-04 features a fully welded turret and frontal engine compartment for more effective troop dismount operation, whereas BMP-3 has the engine situated at the rear.

The first prototype appeared in 1997, hence the designation ZBD-97. The design was finalized in 2004 and entered production in the same year.

== Design ==
The ZBD-04 has a crew of three (a commander, a driver, and a gunner) and can carry seven troops. The commander and gunner are seated in the two-man turret located in the middle, and the driver with one passenger is located in tandem to the left of the power compartment, located at the front right. Six infantrymen are located in the troop compartment at the rear.

There are firing ports on the left, right, and the exit door that allow infantrymen to fire assault rifles or light machine guns from inside the vehicle, even on the move. The vehicle is amphibious, featuring two water jets.

=== Armament ===
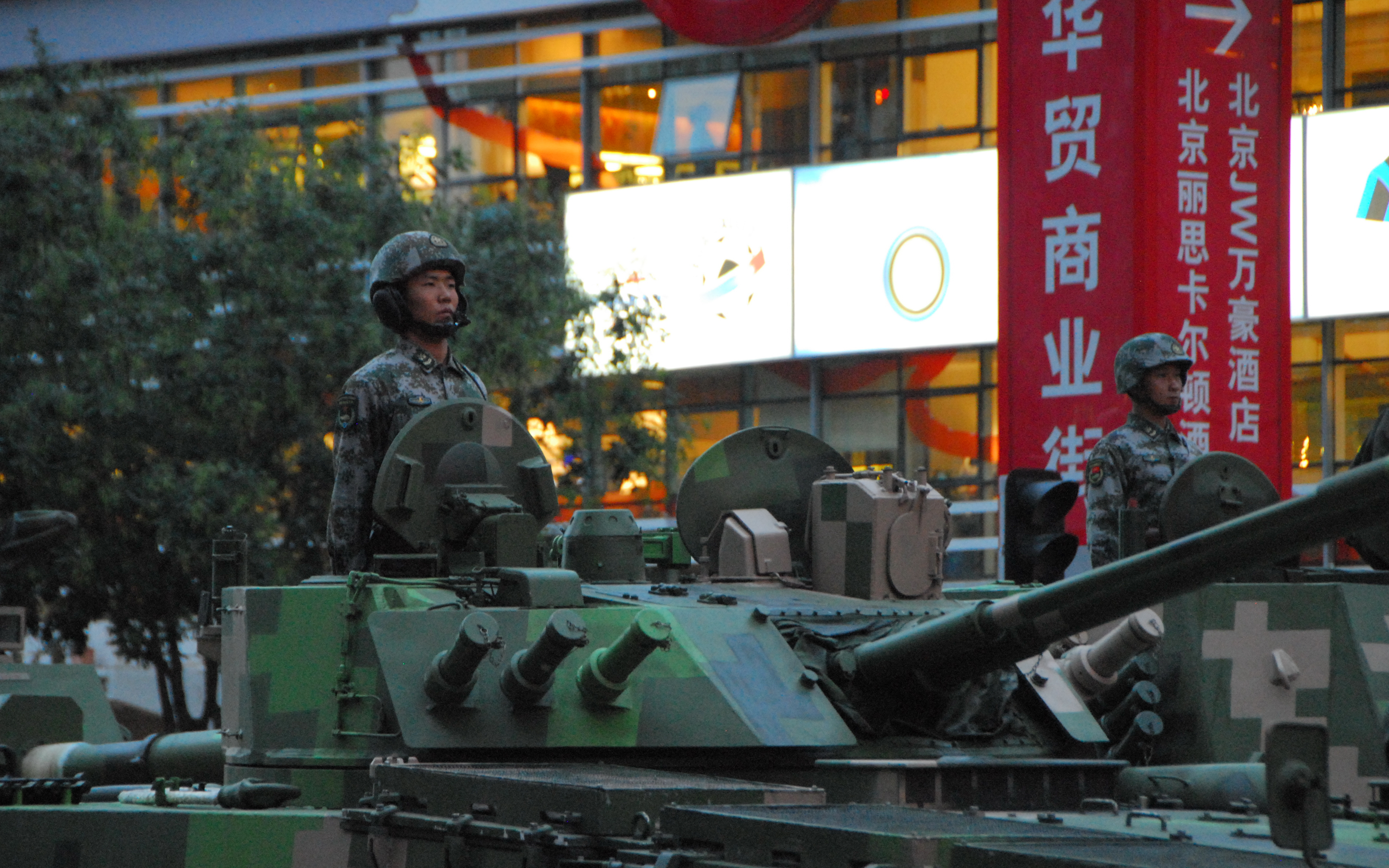
The ZBD-04 turret.

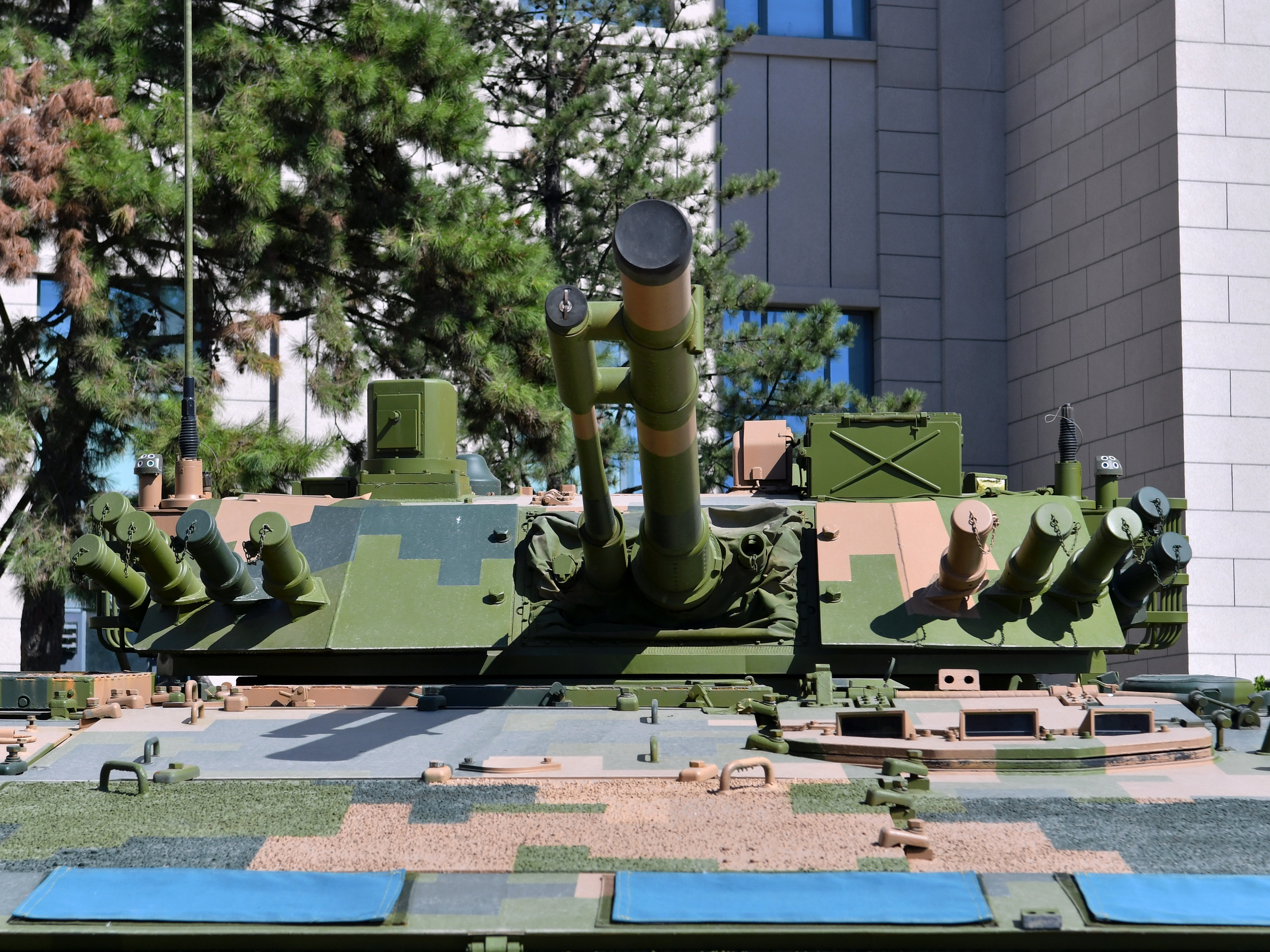
Front view of the ZBD-04A turret, featuring weapons from left to right including 30 mm coaxial automatic cannon, 100 mm rifled gun, and 5.8mm coaxial machine gun. The Commander's Independent Thermal Viewer (CITV), gunner thermal sight, emergency daylight sight as well as laser warning receivers can be seen mounted on top of the turret.

The main armament of the ZBD-04 is a two-plane stabilized, semi-automatic 100 mm rifled gun, capable of firing both HE-FRAG rounds and the 3UBK10 ATGM. The effective range of the HE-FRAG round is estimated to be 4,000 meters, with a rate of fire of 10 rounds/minute. The A270 low-pressure rifled gun can be used similarly to 2A60 mortars, sporting −8°~+60° elevation angles. The 3UBK10 ATGM and its Chinese derivate consist of a laser beam riding missile and a container case. As well as engaging armored vehicles and fortifications, the missile could also engage low-flying helicopters. The missile has a maximum range of 4,000 m and can penetrate 600 mm of armor.

Chinese engineers developed programmable airburst HE-FRAG, bunker-buster, and thermobaric shells for the rifled gun, The Chinese 3UBK10 derivate was also upgraded on the ZBD-04A with top-attack capability supported by the millimeter-wave fire-control radar mounted above the rifled gun. The system can store 30 rounds of 100 mm missiles or other cartridges inside the turret.

The ZBD-04 also has a coaxial ZPT-99 30 mm automatic cannon, with 500 rounds. The cannon can fire both armor-piercing (AP) and HE-FRAG rounds. It is also fitted with indigenously-developed 30 mm armor-piercing discarding sabot (APDS) and armor-piercing fin-stabilized discarding sabot (APFSDS) rounds. The rate of fire is 300 rounds/min and the range is 1,500 to 2,000 m. The ZBD-04 also has a Type 86 7.62 mm coaxial machine gun located to the left of the main gun. The coaxial machine gun was replaced by QJT-88 5.8 mm on the ZBD-04A. Certain variant of the ZBD-04 can be equipped with four HJ-8 wire-guided anti-tank missiles on both sides of the turret.

On ZBD-04A, the main armament layout is kept largely the same, whilst the electronics and protections are upgraded.

=== Electronics ===
On ZBD-04, the gunner has an integrated day/night thermal scope and an emergency backup day sight. The fire-control system includes a digital ballistic computer, an electro-mechanical gun stabilizer, and a laser rangefinder. The driver's hatch mounts three periscopes, with the central periscope being able to be replaced by an image-intensifying night vision periscope. On the original ZBD-04, The commander has a combined daylight/thermal periscope and a backup day sight.

On the ZBD-04A, the vehicle receives an improved thermal system, while the commander has been upgraded to an independent thermal sight that can rotate 360 degrees. The digital fire control system supports "hunter-killer" and commander takeover, automatic target tracking, battle management system, and laser designator functions. A millimeter-wave fire-control radar was mounted above the rifled gun to support target acquisition and missile guidance.

=== Protection ===
The ZBD-04 is fitted with a collective NBC protection system, with its air filter located behind the right side of the turret. There is a three-barrel smoke grenade launcher mounted on either side of the turret. The vehicle is fitted with an indigenous-made laser warning and countermeasures system.

While ballistic protection is unknown, the vehicle likely has all-round protection against 14.5 mm rounds and resistance against 20–25 mm shells over the frontal arc. On the ZBD-04A, the protection is further improved with appliqué armor plates, with a claimed protection level of defending 30 mm round in the front. Two additional smoke discharges are mounted on each side of the turret, for a total of 10.

The ZBD-04 can be mounted with hard-kill active protection system (APS) on the roof. Modifications of ZBD-04A with GL-5 APS were observed in the People's Liberation Army Ground Force in 2025.

=== Mobility ===
ZBD-04 is powered by the modified Type 6V150 diesel engine, developing 440 kilowatts (590 hp). ZBD-04A reportedly has an engine developing 670 hp. The vehicle is fitted with CH600 hydraulic torque converter.

The ZBD-04 has amphibious capability, designed to swim to shore from a ship. For high-speed swimming, it has two large water jet ports. The ZBD-04A removed water jets to save weight in exchange for better protection, thus no longer capable of operating in the open sea.

== Variants ==
=== Domestic ===
ZBD-97
Designation for ZBD-04 prototype.
ZBD-04
Standard variant.
ZBD-04 HJ-8
Based on the original ZBD-04 with four additional HJ-8 anti-tank missiles mounted on the sw1 turret.
ZBD-04A
The ZBD-04A (industrial designation WZ502G, sometimes referred to as ZBD-08) is an improved variant that sacrifices amphibious performance for better armor protection; add-on armor can be fitted, and the frontal arc can withstand 30 mm rounds along with side skirts added. Although the vehicle is still amphibious, able to propel itself by its tracks to ford lakes and rivers, it lacks waterjets and can no longer operate in open sea.
ZBD-04A AT (AFT-10 Anti-Tank Missile Carrier)
ZBD-04A's chassis works as the mobile launching platform for AFT-10 (HJ-10) anti-tank missiles. Noted the AFT-10 is a specific version of the HJ-10 missile that is designed for firing from vehicle launching platforms such as ZBD-04A. The sensors include a thermal camera, TV camera, and a laser range finder. A millimeter-wave radar system is mounted at the front-right corner of the vehicle to improve all-weather operation capability.
ZBD-04A Command Vehicle
Modified from the original ZBD-04A, featuring a crew cabin with a higher ceiling.
ZBD-04A Combat Reconnaissance Vehicle
Equipped with radars and electric-optic sights for battlefield surveillance, the chassis of the Combat Reconnaissance Vehicle is modified from standard ZBD-04A. The recon equipment is mounted on a retractable mast.
ZBD-04A Armored Recovery Vehicle
Equipped with a crane for emergency vehicle service. As known as ZHB-04.
PLZ-07
122 mm self-propelled howitzer based on the ZBD-04 chassis.

=== Export ===
VN11
Export version of the ZBD-04.
VN11A
Export version of the ZBD-04A.
VN12
Export variant based on ZBD-04A.

== Operators ==
China

- People's Liberation Army Ground Force – 3,675+ units as of 2026. 400 units of ZBD-04; 450 units of ZBD-04 HJ-8 Carrier with the sw1 turret; 2,600 units of ZBD-04A; 200 units of ZBD-04A HJ-10 Carrier; 25 units of ZBD-04A HJ-10A Carrier; Uncounted units of other variants.

== Gallery ==
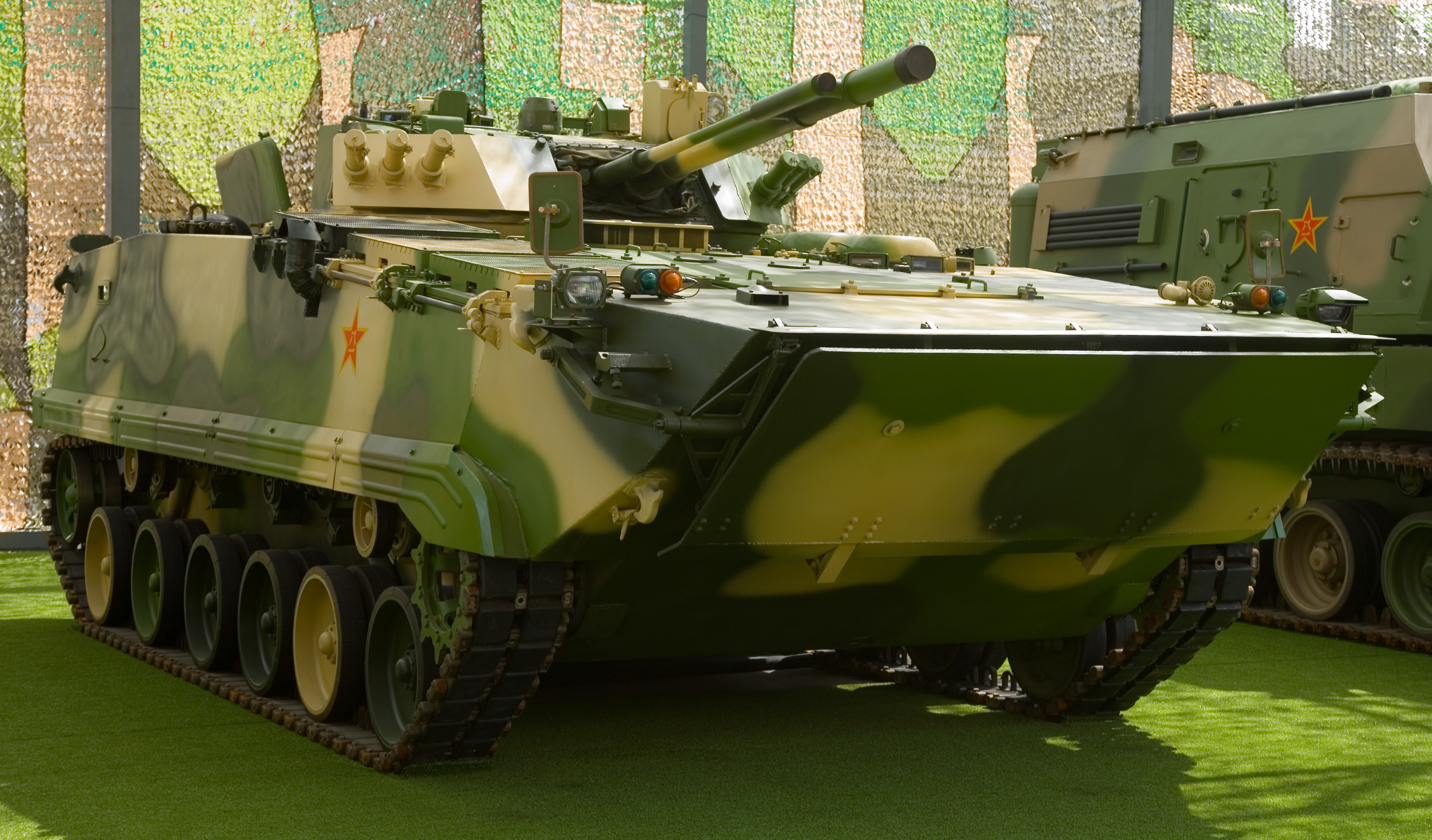
ZBD-04 at the China People's Revolution Military Museum in Beijing during the 2007 Our troops towards the sun exhibition.

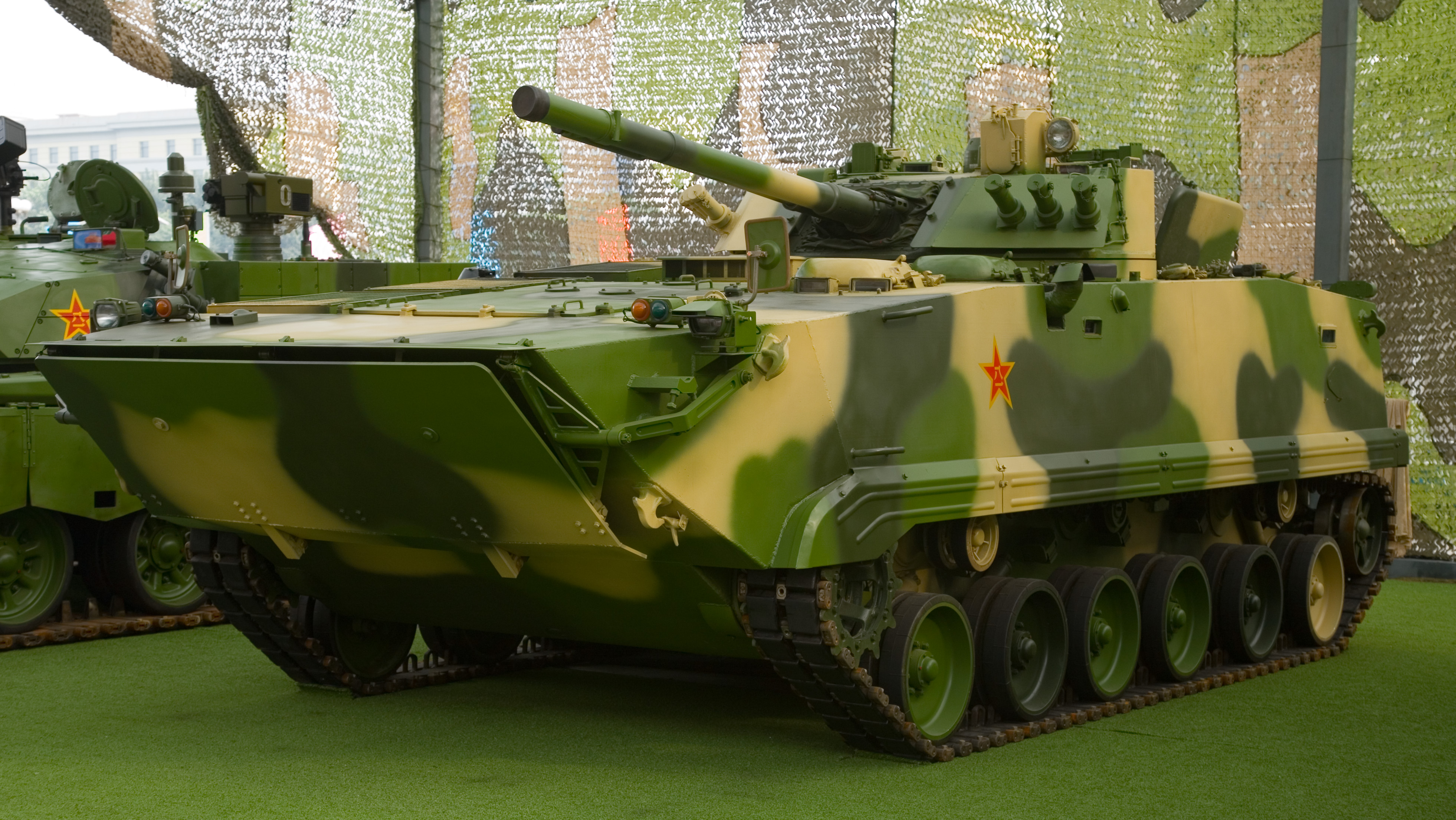
ZBD-04 IFV.

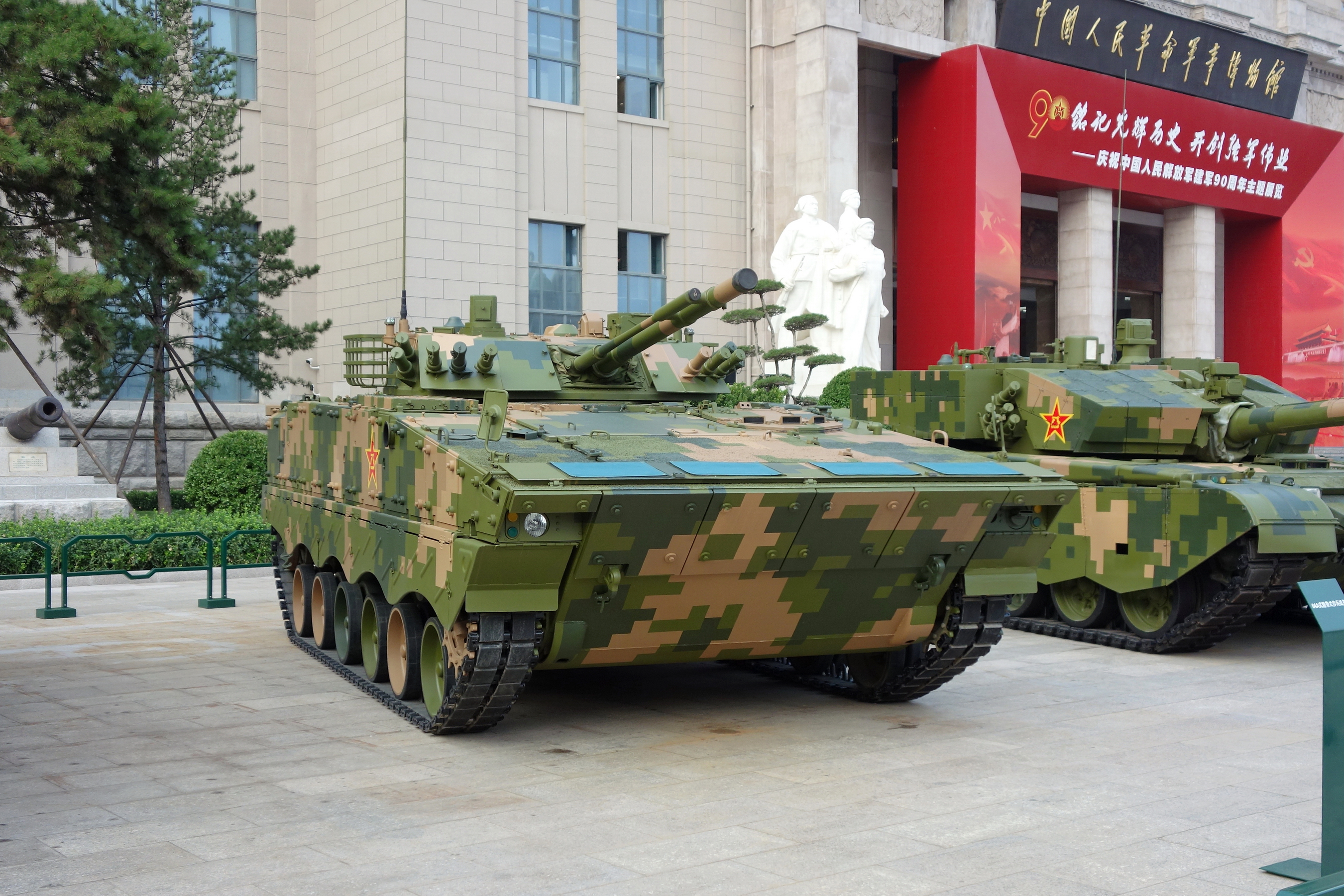
ZBD-04A at Theme Exhibition of the 90th Anniversary of Chinese People's Liberation Army.

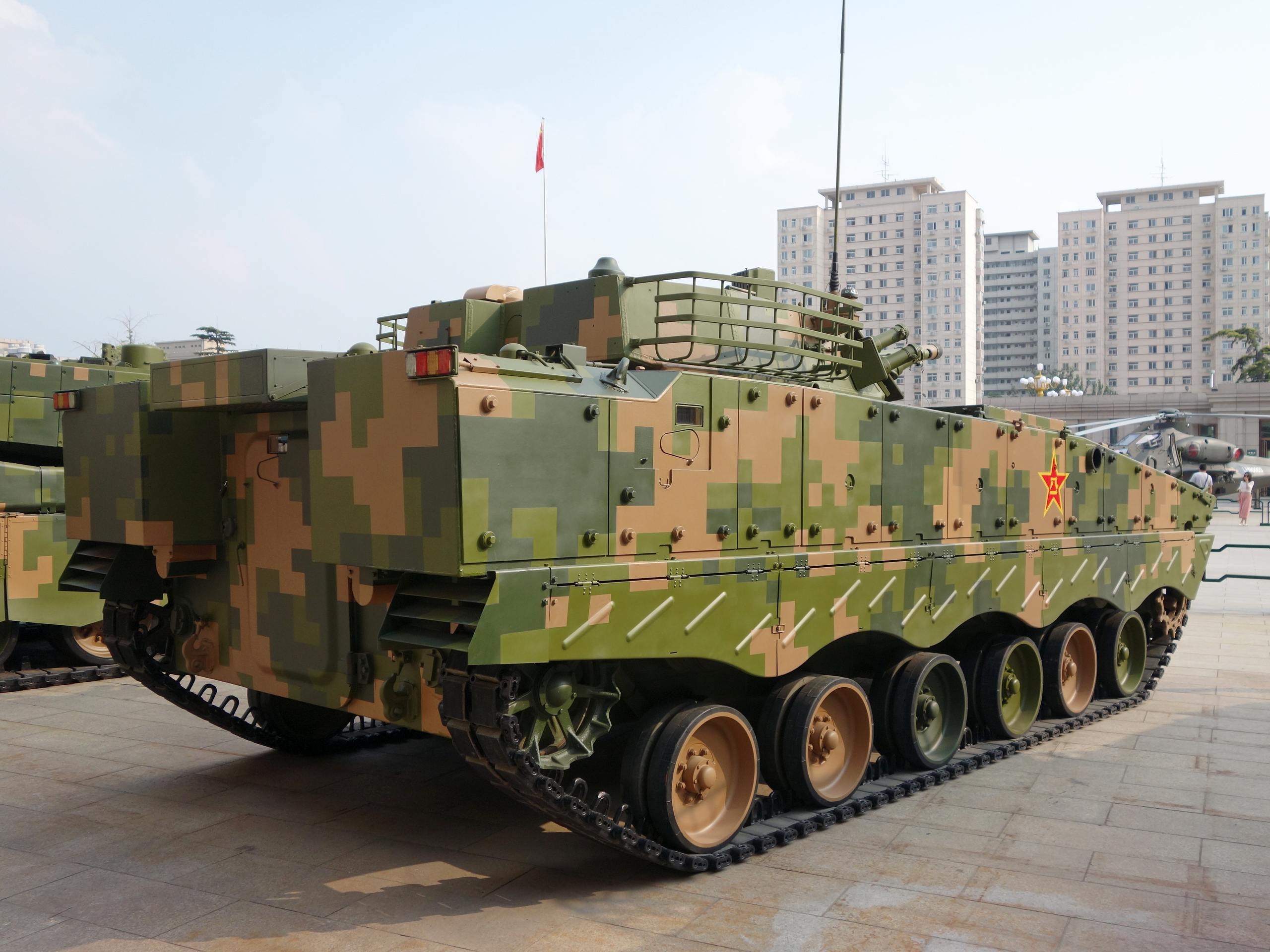
Rear side of ZBD-04A.

== See also ==
- List of modern armored fighting vehicles

Related development

- ZSD-89A – armored personnel carrier chassis complementing the ZBD-04 series.
- ZBD-03 – airborne combat vehicle developed by China
- ZBD-05 – amphibious fighting vehicle developed by China
- ZBL-08 – wheeled infantry fighting vehicle developed by China

Similar ground systems

- ASCOD – (Spain, Austria)
- M2 Bradley – (United States)
- BMP-3 – (Soviet Union, Russia)
- BMD-4 – (Russia)
- CV90 – (Sweden)
- Warrior – (United Kingdom)
- Type 89 – (Japan)
- K21 – (South Korea)
- Makran IFV – (Iran)
- Puma IFV – (Germany)
- Hunter AFV – (Singapore)
