= Army Academy of Armored Forces =

Chinese military academy

- 中国人民解放军陆军装甲兵学院
- Logo of the Army Academy of Armored Forces
- Type: Military Academy
- Established: 2017
- Affiliations: People's Liberation Army Ground Force
- Academic staff: 650 faculty, 400 specialized scientific researchers
- Location: Main Campus: Guishuling Shejiakan #21, Changxindian Town, Fengtai District, Beijing; Bengbu Campus: Chaoyang Nanlu, Bengshan District, Bengbu City, Anhui; NCO School: Technological and Economic Development Area, Changchun City, Jilin; 39.840800°N 116.185031°E
- Location within Beijing

People's Liberation Army Army Academy of Armored Forces, usually called the Army Academy of Armored Forces (MOE 91006) is the primary academic training institution for officers and NCOs of the armored forces of the PLAGF. Its largest campus is located in Bengbu, and its NCO School is located in Changchun.

== History ==
PLA Academy of Armored Forces

- The academy was founded in 1950 as the PLA Tank School. Initially established at Tianjin, it relocated to Beijing.
- In May 1951, it was renamed the PLA First Combat Vehicle School.
- In March 1953, it was renamed the PLA First Tank School.
- In February 1969, the PLA First Tank School was abolished.
- In December 1978, the Central Military Commission (CMC) re-established the school as the PLA Tank School in Su County, Anhui Province.
- In July 1982, the school relocated to Bengbu City, Anhui Province.
- In June 1986, it was reformed as the Bengbu Tank Academy of the CLPA.
- In November 2011, it was renamed the PLA Academy of Armored Forces.
- In 2016, the school was reassigned from the General Staff Department (GSD) to the PLA Army.

Armored Force Engineering College of the CPLA or Armored Corps Engineering College

- In 1961, the college was created.
- In 1969, the PLA merged the college into the PLA Tank Technical School in Beijing.
- In 1976, the school was renamed the Armored Forces Technical School of the CPLA.
- In 1978, it was renamed the Armored Forces Technical College of the CPLA.
- In 1986, it was renamed the Armored Forces Engineering College of the CPLA.
- In May 1999, the school was transferred from the PLA General Staff Department (GSD) to the PLA General Armament Department (GAD).
- In 2004, the Armored Forces Research Institute was integrated into the college.
- In 2016, the college was transferred from the GAD to the PLA Army.

Army Academy of Armored Forces (中国人民解放军陆军装甲兵学院)

- In 2017, the Army Academy of Armored Forces was created by merging the PLA Armored Forces College in Bengbu, the PLA Armored Forces Engineering College in Beijing, and the PLA Armored Forces Technical College in Changchun.

== Organization ==
The identified units of the Army Academy of Armored Forces are:

=== Academic departments ===
- Mechanical Engineering
- Control Engineering
- Arms Engineering
- Equipment Command and Management
- Technical Support Engineering
- Information Engineering
- Equipment Rebuilding Engineering
- Foreigners Military Training

=== Key labs ===
- Two Key Laboratories of National Defense Technology
- Three all-Armed Forces Key Laboratories

=== Research Labs ===
- One National Engineering Center
- One National Experimental Teaching Demonstration Center
- Two research stations: Armament Science and Technology and Materials Science and Engineering

=== Armored Equipment Technology Institute (装甲兵装备技术研究所) ===
The former Engineering College hosts the institute, which is the only comprehensive research center for armored equipment of the PLA, and also operates as the "quality inspection station" and "security research center" of new tanks and armored vehicles introduced by the PLA. Its subordinated unit, the Armored Equipment Technology Testing Grounds, established in 1960, is the only testing and certification facility for armored vehicles and tanks in the PLA. In 1970, the Testing Grounds opened a satellite test site in Tahe County, Heilongjiang province, in order to test armored equipment in cold environments. As of 2016, the Testing Grounds has done the testing and certification of all Chinese armored vehicles, from the Type 59 tank to the most recent additions like the Type 15 tank.

== Courses and Specialties ==
The academy grants associate, bachelor, masters and doctoral degrees, plus courses for retraining officers, mid-career courses, and other specialization courses. As of 2020, on the three broad disciplines of engineering, management, and military science, the academy has: 6 post-doctoral research stations, 5 first-level doctoral programs, 19 second-level doctoral programs; 6 first-level, 3 secondary, and 8 specialist master's degrees, and 50 general master's programs; the academy has 18 undergraduate majors.

The 11 undergraduate majors enrolling the initial class in 2017 were:

- Mechanical Engineering
- Electrical Engineering and Automation
- Communications Engineering
- Optoelectronic Science and Engineering
- Weapon Systems and Applications Engineering
- Armored Vehicles Engineering
- Combat Command
- Firepower Command and Control Engineering
- Unmanned Systems Engineering
- Command Communication Systems Engineering
- Simulations Engineering

== Leadership ==
PLA Armored Forces College (中国人民解放军装甲兵学院)

Directors

- Xu Guangda (许光达) Col Gen (1950—?)
- Wang Zhenxiang (王振祥) Maj Gen (?—?)
- Zhao Jie (赵杰) Maj Gen (?—?)
- Bai Lian (白琏) (1978—?)
- Zhu Haifeng (朱海峰) (?—1982)
- Chen Benchang (陈本梴) (?—1984)
- ? (?—?，unrecorded Bengbu Tank College director)
- Lan Jun (兰俊) Sr Col (?—?)
- Cao Yanping (曹延平) Sr Col (?—2005年)
- Wang Zhibang (王治邦) Sr Col (2005–2010)
- Qiao Jun (乔军) Sr Col (2010–2011)
- Li Zhuanfang (李传芳) Sr Col (Nov 2011–2012)
- Huang Yongping (黄永平) Maj Gen (2012–2017)

Political Commissars

- Wang Huanru (王焕如) Sr Col (?—?)
- Qian Zhichao (钱志超) Sr Col (?—?)
- Li Fazhao (李法昭) (1978年—?)
- Wang Junwen (王允文) (?—?)
- Hu Jia (胡茄) (?—?)
- Zang Tiantang (藏天堂) (?—?)
- Su Yuzhi (苏玉志) Maj Gen (Jun 1986–1995)
- ?(?—?，蚌埠坦克学院政治委员)
- Fu Zhenzhong (傅振中) Sr Col (?—2005)
- Jia Jiyong (贾继勇) Sr Col (2005–2010)
- Fang Jun (方军) Sr Col (2010–2011)
- Bao Tingxiang (鲍廷祥) Maj Gen (Nov 2011–2014)
- Yang Ge (PLA) (杨戈) Maj Gen (2014–2017)

PLA Armored Forces Engineering College (中国人民解放军装甲兵工程学院)

Directors

- Wang Zhenxiang (王振祥) Maj Gen(1961—Jan 1965)
- Sha Feng (沙风) Sr Col (1965—Dec 1969)
- Niu Mingzhi (牛明智)(1967–1968)
- Huang Zuhua (黄祖华)(1968–1969)
  - Lin Shan (林彬) Maj Gen (1952—Oct 1959, 2nd Tank School)
  - Hu Jian (胡鉴) Sr Col (1959—? 2nd Tank School)
  - Ma Ji (马骥) Sr Col (?—?，2nd Tank School))
- Huang Zuhua (黄祖华) (1969—Apr 1970)
- Ye Zao (叶藻) (1970—Dec 1970)
- Lin Yue (林岳) (?—?)
- Ma Ji (马骥) (1976年—1978年，装甲兵技术学校校长；Feb 1978—1981，装甲兵技术学院院长)
- Zhu Weiqing (祝位青) (?—1983)
- Xue Qingchi (薛清池) (?—1986年，装甲兵技术学院院长；1986—1988)
- Huang Qinghua (黄庆华) Maj Gen(1988–1990)
- Cai Kangsheng (蔡康生) Maj Gen(Jun 1990–1994)
- Liu Shican (刘世参) Maj Gen(1994–1998)
- Wang Hongguang (王洪光) Maj Gen(Feb 1998—Sep 2002)
- Liang Yongsheng (梁永生) Maj Gen(2002–2009)
- Xu Han (徐航) (2009–2017)

Political Commissars

- Niu Mingzhi (牛明智) Sr Col (July 1952—June 1958，Second Tank School)
- Li Yutang (李玉堂) Sr Col (?—Nov 1960，Second Tank School)
- Liu Guofu (刘国辅) Maj Gen (?—?，Second Tank School)
- Wang Zaixing (王再兴) Maj Gen (1961—May 1965, died in office)
- Niu Mingzhi (牛明智) Maj Gen (Aug 1965—Dec 1969)
- Yu Ding (于丁) (1969—Dec 1970)
- Wang Guoqing (王国靖) (Oct 1970—?)
- Li Min (PLA) (李民) (Jan 1977–1978)
- Wang Changde (王广德) (Feb 1978—1983，装甲兵技术学院政治委员)

......

- Wang Yintong (王荫桐) Maj Gen (?—?)
- Hong Shaowu (冯少武) Maj Gen (Dec 1992—Jun 1999)
- Xiang Yucai (项玉才) Maj Gen (1999–2002)
- Fan Zhaodong (范兆东) Maj Gen (2002–2009)
- Zhong Fakong (种法孔) Maj Gen (2009–2013)
- Xia Xiaopeng (夏晓鹏) Maj Gen (Jun 2013—Dec 2014)
- Qi Yahu (祁亚虎) Maj Gen (Dec 2014–2017)

Army Academy of Armored Forces

Director

- Xu Hang (徐航) Maj Gen(2017–2019)
- Li Shengli (李胜利) Maj Gen(2019–2024)

Political Commissar

- Yang Ge (杨戈) Maj Gen(2017—)

== See also ==
- PLAGF Armored Forces
- PLA Tank Museum

== See also ==
Academic institutions of the armed forces of China
