= 59-16 light tank =

Chinese light tank project

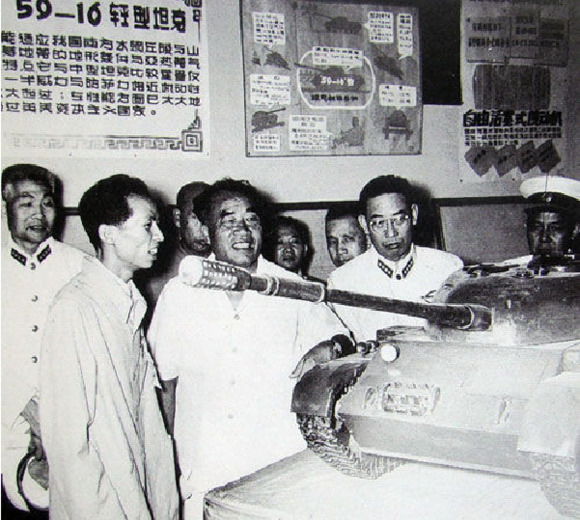
- Type: Light tank
- Place of origin: PRC

Production history
- Produced: 1959

Specifications
- Mass: ~16 mt
- Crew: 4
- Armor: Unknown
- Main armament: 1 × 76 mm tank gun

59-16 light tank (simplified Chinese: 59-16轻型坦克; traditional Chinese: 59-16輕型坦克) was a proposed Chinese light tank design developed in the late 1950s. The project, which started in 1957 with the design finalized in 1959, was initially planned as a "tribute to the 10th anniversary of the founding of the PRC."

The 59-16 was specifically conceived as a lighter alternative to the Type 59 Main Battle Tank, making it suitable for operations in the difficult, soft, and mountainous terrain of Southern China. Its design specifications included a weight of approximately 16 Metric Tons and a main gun of 76 mm. However, the military ultimately shelved the design because it was considered too lightly armed and armored to effectively counter the more formidable Western tanks of the era.

== See also ==
- WZ-132
- WZ-131
- Type 62 light tank (The later, successful light tank for Southern China)
