= PLA Tank Museum =

Military museum in Beijing

People's Liberation Army Tank Museum
- 中国人民解放军坦克博物馆
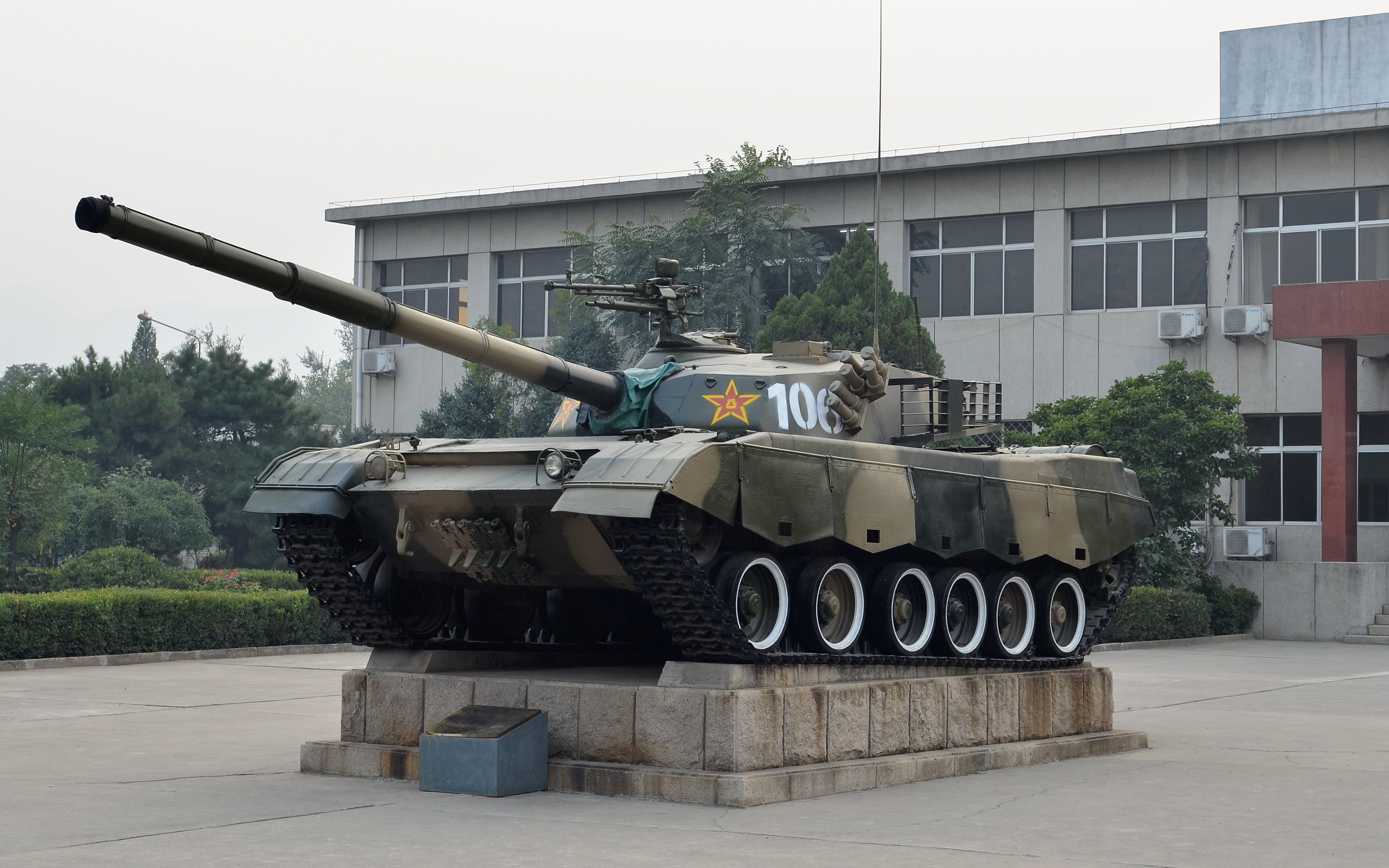

- Location within Beijing
- Established: September 1, 1990
- Location: Wennan Rd, Yangfang City, Changping District, Beijing. China
- Coordinates: 40.161966°N 116.125293°E
- Type: Military museum

The PLA Tank Museum is a (currently inactive) military museum located in Changping district, Beijing. It is China's only specialist tank museum.

== Description ==
The Tank Museum was completed on 1 September 1990, originally named "People's Armored Forces Exhibition Hall", renamed to "Tank Museum" on 1 August 1997 after an expansion and reopening. At that time, the museum had a display surface of 5.3 ha in 11 exhibition halls. It is located within the compound of unit 8837 of the PLAGF.

At the entrance of the Tank Museum there is a Type 96 main battle tank.The museum exhibition is divided into three main sectors: the history of the PLA's armored forces, the history of the world's armored forces, and the physical exhibition of armored vehicles. The museum exhibits 392 historical documents, 100 historical items, 2,000 photos, 50 tanks and armored vehicles, and 300 scale models of armored vehicles from across the world.

== Notable exhibits ==
China

1. Type 59 MBT
2. Type 63 APC
3. Type 63 Amphibious Tank
4. Type 69
5. WZ-111 Heavy tank
6. Type 85 AFV
7. Type 80 MBT
8. Type 96 MBT

Soviet Union/Russia

1. SU-76
2. SU-100
3. ISU-152
4. T-34
5. IS-2
6. T-54/55

USA

1. LVT(A)-4 Amphibious Boat
2. M3/M5 Stuart

Japan

1. Type 97 Chi-Ha
2. Type 94 tankette
