= Type 63A light tank =

Chinese amphibious light tank

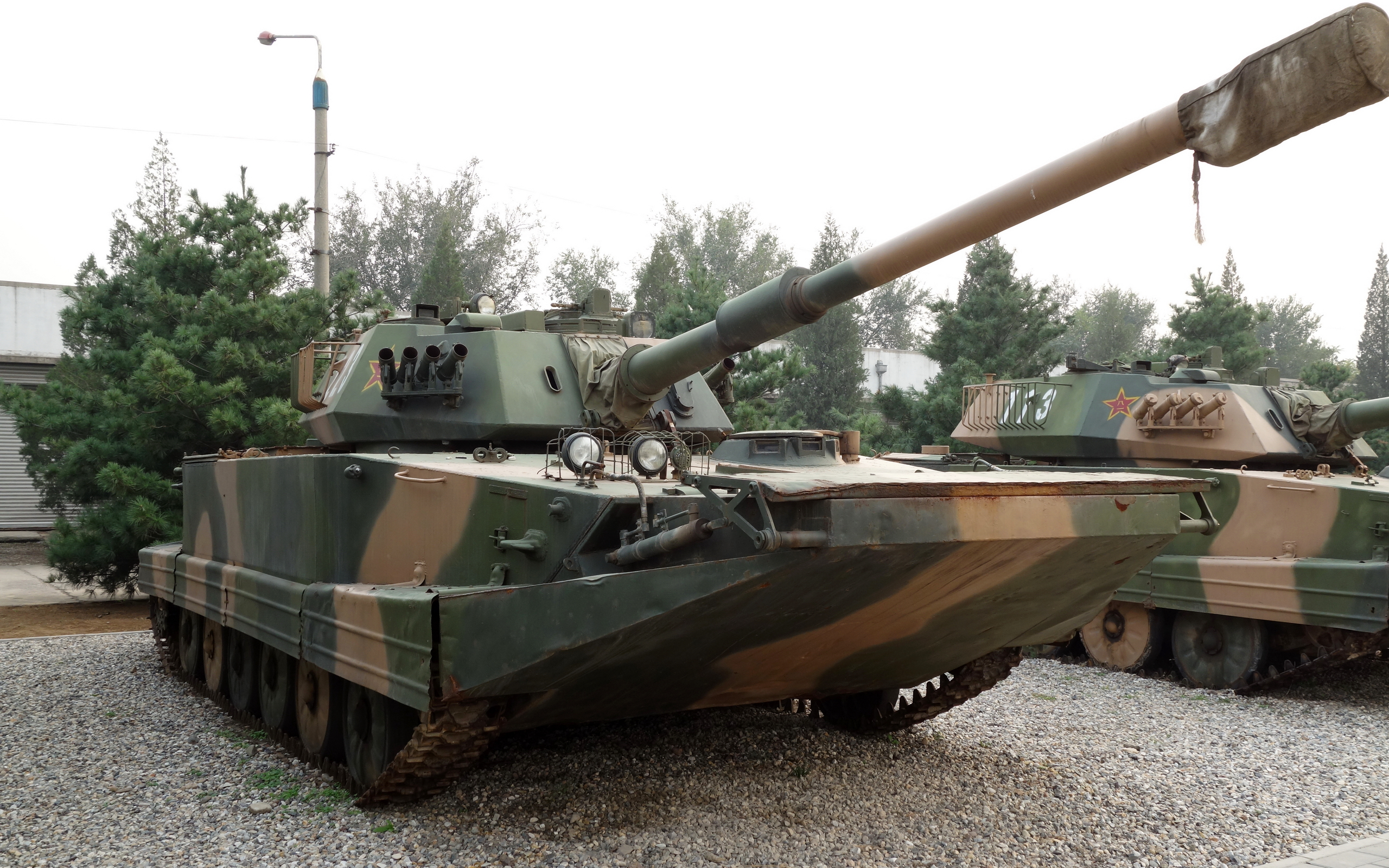
- Type 63A amphibious tank
- Type: Amphibious light tank
- Place of origin: People's Republic of China

Production history
- Manufacturer: Norinco
- Produced: 1997

Specifications
- Mass: 20 t (3,100 st)
- Length: Gun forward: 9.6 m (31 ft)
- Width: 3.2 m (10 ft)
- Height: 2.5 m (8.2 ft)
- Crew: 4 (Driver, Loader, Commander, Gunner)
- Armor: Welded steel
- Main armament: 105mm rifled gun
- Secondary armament: 12.7mm anti-aircraft machine gun, 7.62mm coaxial machine gun
- Engine: 1215L7BW diesel 581 hp (433 kW)
- Power/weight: 26.4hp/tonne
- Suspension: torsion bar
- Operational range: Land: 400 km (250 mi), Sea 120 km (65 nmi)
- Maximum speed: Land 75 km/h (47 mph), Swim 14 km/h (7.6 kn)

The Type 63A (Chinese: 63A式; pinyin: Liùsān A shì; also known as the ZTS63A) is an amphibious light tank upgraded from the Type 63, designed for river-crossing operations at inland rivers and lakes. Its industrial designation is WZ213.

The Type 63A is being replaced by the ZTD-05 amphibious assault tank.

== Development ==
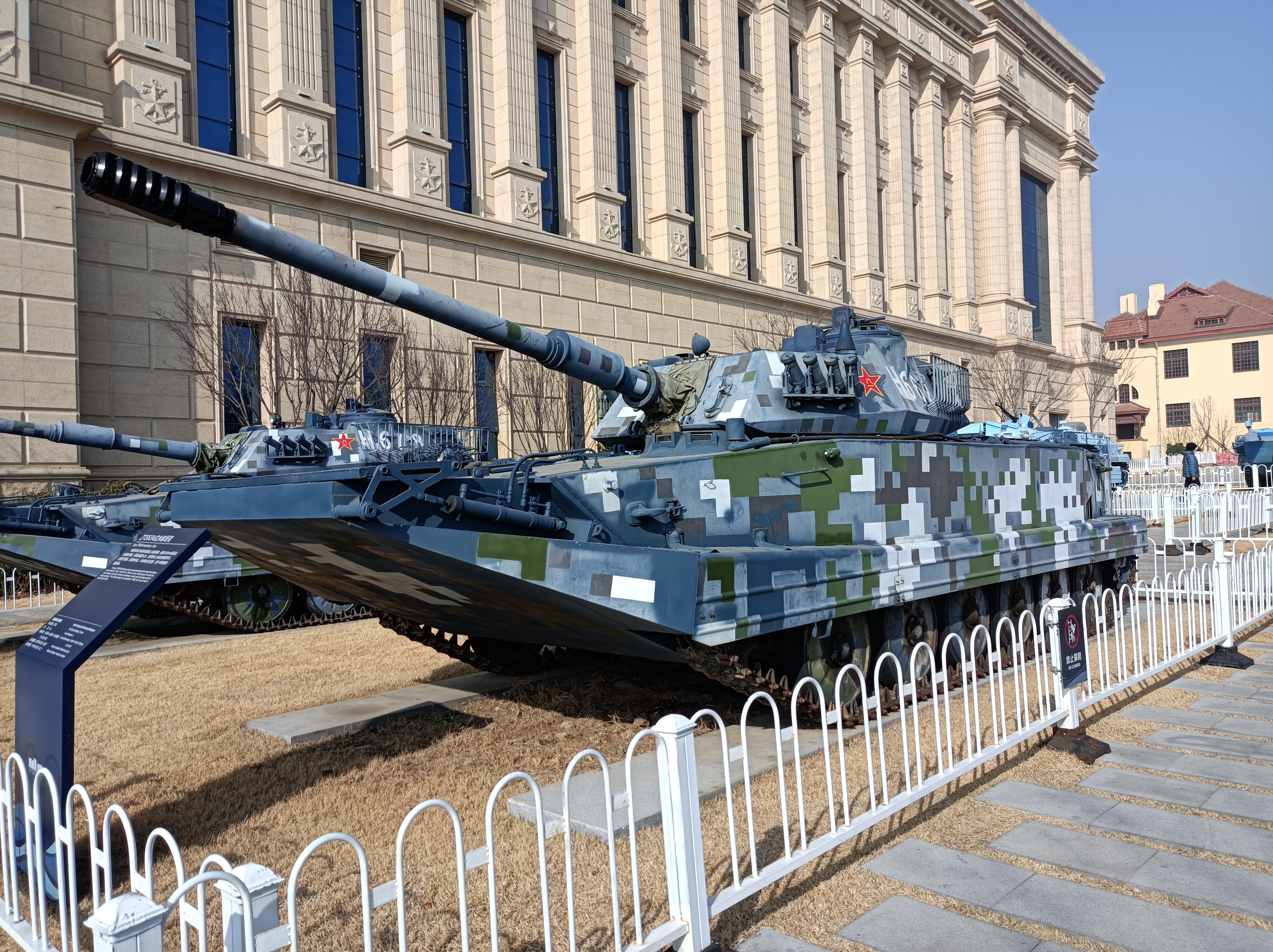
Retired Type 63A displayed at the PLA Navy museum

Before the mid-1990s, Chinese ground forces relied on the Type 63 amphibious light tank developed in the early 1960s. The low swimming speed and weak firepower of the Type 63 were insufficient for the needs of modern maritime amphibious assault operations that the PLA would conduct. The PLA demanded a replacement for the Type 63 in the early 1990s, which led to the development of the Type 63A in 1997. Reports indicate that over 300 examples have been delivered to the PLA by the end of 2000.

Compared to the Type 63, the Type 63A featured five major improvements: enhanced sea-traveling performance, increased swimming speed, improved fire-control system, ATGM capability, and a larger 105 mm rifled gun with dual stabilizers.

== Design ==
=== Characteristics ===
The Type 63A is a lightly armored amphibious light tank with a flat, boat-like hull. The suspension comprises 6 road wheels and lead or return rollers. A redesigned welded turret from the original Type 63 is mounted at the center of the hull, with the powerpack positioned in the rear. The Type 63A has 2 additional floating tanks to increase the stability of the vehicle in the water. There are 3 water inlets on both sides of the hull. In the rear of the hull, there are to allow 2 large water jets for traveling in water.

=== Armament ===
Type 63A introduces an enlarged welded turret replacing the original Type 63 turret, the modernized Type 63A utilizes a two-axis stabilized ZPL-98 105 mm (4.1 in) rifled gun replacing the 85 mm (3.3 in) gun. The 105 mm (4.1 in) rifled gun fires armor-piercing fin-stabilized discarding sabot (APFSDS), high explosive (HE), and high-explosive anti-tank (HEAT) ammunition, and GP105 laser beam riding guided missiles. A total of 45 rounds can be carried inside the vehicle. APFSDS round can penetrate 400 mm (16 in) RHA armour or destroy a reinforced concrete bunker at a distance of 2,000 m.

To overcome the inaccuracy of firing when swimming, the GP105 gun-launched missile uses laser-beam riding guidance, which is not affected by wave motion while swimming. The missile has a maximum firing range of 4–5 km (2.5–3.1 mi) with a first hit probability of +90% against stationary targets. It can also engage low-flying helicopters. Secondary weapons include QJC-88 roof-mounted machine gun and Type 63 coaxial machine gun.

=== Mobility ===
The Type 63A enhances Type 63 amphibious capability, allowing the vehicle to conduct amphibious operations from its host amphibious warfare ships at distances from 10 km (5.4 nmi) to the shore at a speed of 14 km/h (7.6 kn).

=== Fire control ===
The FCS includes a digital fire-control computer, integrated commander sight with laser rangefinder input, daylight optics, and image-stabilized gunner's sight with passive night vision. The Type 63A night vision is an image intensifier system. Alternatively, the gunner sight can be fitted with a thermal imager for night vision. It is also equipped with the satellite positioning (GPS/GLONASS) system to allow accurate landing positions in harsh weather conditions and night operations. It is also equipped with computerized fire control to enable accurate firing both on land and at sea.

== Variants ==
Type 63A
original variant, modified from Type 63.
Type 63A-I
Type 63A fitted with a bow extension, bigger side skirts that cover the tracks more, attachment points for additional armor on the front of the turret (possibly ERA), and more advanced sighting devices (as evidenced by larger periscopes). It is also known by industrial designator, WZ213-1. It is also known as ZTS63A-1.
Type 63A-II
Type 63A-I bolt mounts for additional armor all over the turret and hull sides. It is also known by industrial designator, WZ213-2. It is also known as ZTS63A-2.
Type 03P
Export-oriented variant of Type 63A, featuring modified chassis and turret.
Type 63AG
Export-oriented variant of Type 63A, featuring improved chassis, turret, and fire control system.

== Operators ==
China

- People's Liberation Army Ground Force – 100 as of 2021. Phasing out.
