= 132 (tank) =

Chinese light tank prototype

132 light tank
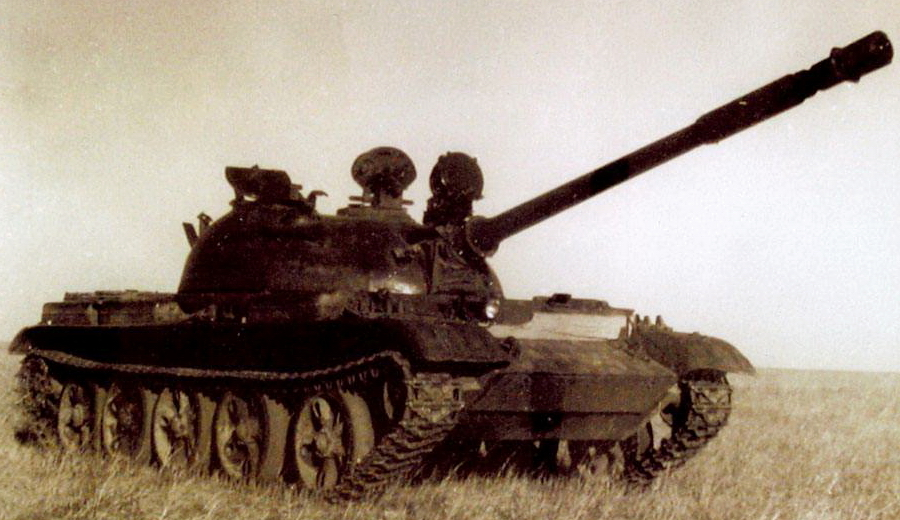
- Type: Light tank
- Place of origin: China

Specifications
- Mass: 22.5 t (24.8 short tons) (in 1973)
- Length: 8.53 m (28.0 ft) (with gun)
- Width: 2.92 m (9.6 ft)
- Height: 2.12 m (7.0 ft)
- Crew: 4 (commander, loader, gunner, driver)
- Main armament: 100 mm (4 in) smoothbore gun
- Secondary armament: 1 × 12.7 mm (0.5 in) machine gun 2 × 7.62 mm (0.3 in) machine guns
- Engine: Diesel
- Power/weight: 18 kW/t
- Suspension: Torsion bar suspension
- Operational range: 500 km (310 mi)
- Maximum speed: 65 km/h (40 mph) (on road)

132 light tank (simplified Chinese: 132轻型坦克; traditional Chinese: 132輕型坦克) was a series of Chinese light tanks which were developed between the late 1950s and 1970s. Its development lasted for more than ten years before it was set aside, ultimately proving too technical to be brought into production.

== Design and development ==
During the 1960s and 70s, in what became known as the Sino-Soviet split, the relationship between China and the Soviet Union became extremely tense. In competition with Soviet tank designers, the Chinese developed several tanks including the Type 59, Type 62, and Type 63 variants. The 132 was also designed around this time; however, its technical indicators were too high for China at that time to produce it in large numbers and as a result, its specifications were changed several times before the design was set aside in 1975.

The vehicle was 8.53 m (28.0 ft) long, including its gun, and by 1973 weighed 22.5 t (24.8 short tons). It was 2.12 m (7.0 ft) high and 2.92 m (9.6 ft) wide. With a crew of four – commander, loader, gunner, driver – the vehicle's primary armament consisted of a single 100 mm (4 in) smoothbore gun, with a single 12.7 mm (0.5 in) machine gun and two 7.62 mm (0.3 in) machine guns as secondary weapons. At least two other vehicles were equipped with different weapons, with one tank sporting a 85mm smoothbore gun, and another having a 76.2mm gun as its main armament with an alleged autoloader that was never completed. It had a power-to-weight ratio of 18 kW/t and was capable of achieving a speed of 65 km/h (40 mph) on road, with a range of 500 km (310 mi). The vehicle used torsion bar suspension. Towards the end stage of development, the 132 incorporated a new fire control system including a ballistic computer and a two-plane stabilizer, as well as an image intensifier and laser rangefinder for the gunner. The late-stage prototypes also received an infrared searchlight and respective infrared night vision devices for the commander and the driver.

== See also ==
- WZ-111
- Type 69
- Type 62
