= Type 62 light tank =

Chinese light tank

Type 62
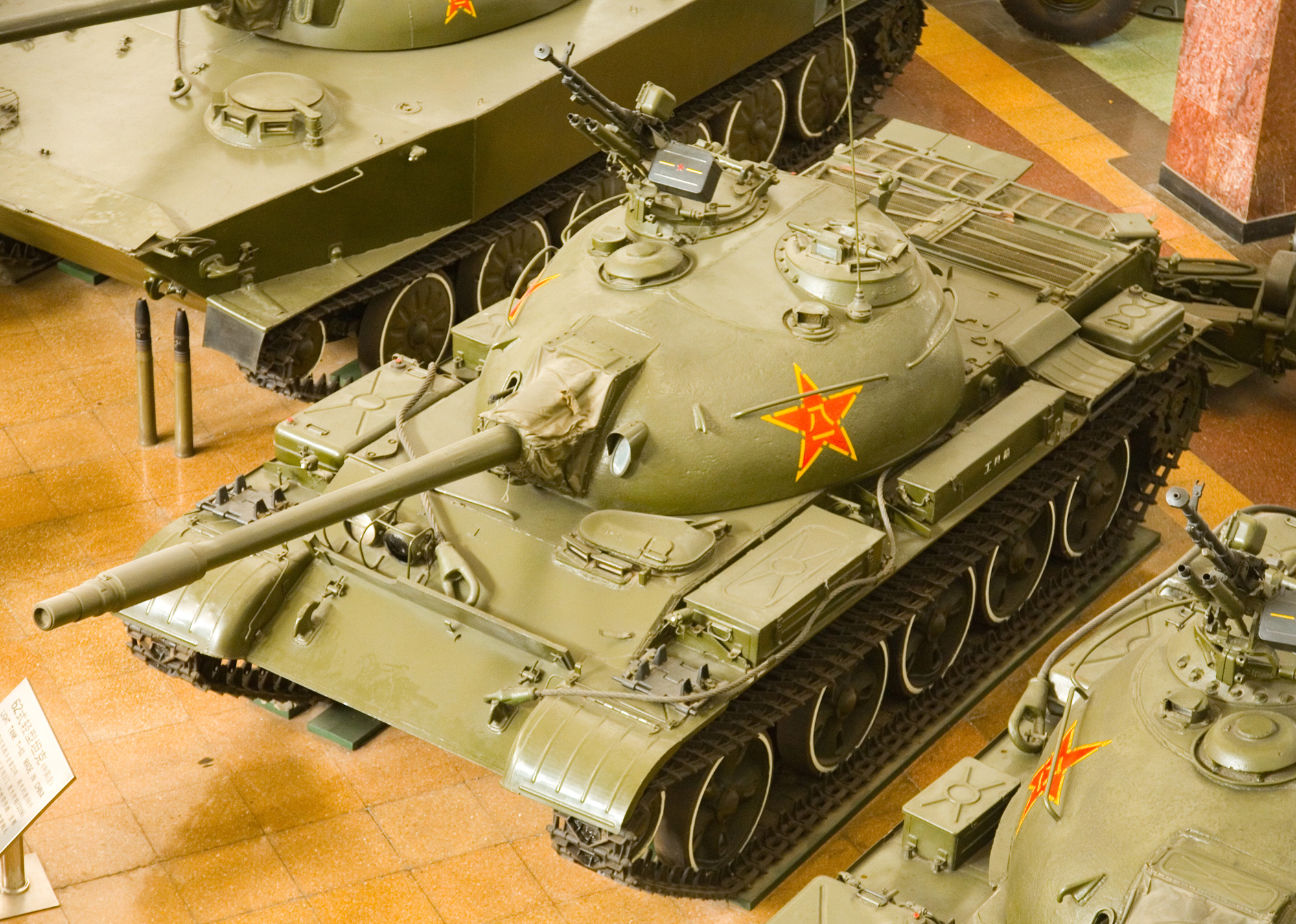
- Chinese Type 62 light tank at the China People's Revolution Military Museum
- Type: Light tank
- Place of origin: China

Service history
- In service: 1961 – 2013 (China)
- Used by: See Operators
- Wars: Laotian Civil War; Cambodian Civil War; Uganda–Tanzania War; Sino-Vietnamese War; Second Sudanese Civil War; First Congo War; Second Congo War; Kivu conflict Sudanese civil war (2023–present)

Production history
- Manufacturer: 674 Factory (Harbin First Machinery Building Group Ltd)
- Produced: 1963–1989
- No. built: about 1,500
- Variants: See Variants

Specifications
- Mass: 21 tonnes
- Length: 7.9 m overall 5.6 m hull only
- Width: 2.9 m (9 ft 6 in)
- Height: 2.3 m
- Crew: 4
- Armor: 12.5 mm (roof and belly) to 50 mm turret (turret)
- Main armament: 85 mm Type 62-85TC rifled main gun (47 rounds)
- Secondary armament: 7.62 mm Type 59T coaxial medium machine gun 7.62 mm Type 59T bow mounted medium machine gun 2,000 7.62 machine gun rounds 12.7 mm Type 54 anti-aircraft heavy machine gun (1,250 rounds)
- Engine: 12150L-3 V-12 liquid-cooled diesel 430 hp (321 kW) at 1,800 rpm
- Power/weight: 20.5 hp/tonne (15.3 kW/tonne)
- Suspension: torsion bar
- Operational range: 500 km
- Maximum speed: 60 km/h (37 mph) on road 35 km/h (22 mph) cross country

The Norinco Type 62 (Chinese: 62式; pinyin: Liù'èr shì) is a Chinese light tank developed in the early 1960s, based on the Chinese Type 59 with a reduced main gun calibre, lighter armour and a smaller suite of electronics and other equipment to help reduce weight. Bearing in mind that the Chinese Type 59 is essentially the Soviet T-54 (introduced 1947), its reduction the Type 62 with its 85 mm cannon and wedgy little turret is clearly reminiscent of the hull-predecessor of the T-54 which is T-44-85 (introduced 1944), which turret and gun are from the T-34-85 (introduced 1943). The Type 62 is retired from the Chinese People's Liberation Army Ground Forces, but is still in use with other nations. It had recently been upgraded to modern standards and to provide the PLA with a dedicated light tank. It is also known under its industrial designation, WZ-131.

== Development history ==
When the Type 59 main battle tank was being developed it became apparent that because of high weight of the tank it would have difficulties operating in areas of southern China. These areas mostly consist of mountain ranges, hills, rice paddy fields, lakes and multiple rivers which many times are without a bridge or with bridges which couldn't withstand the weight of the Type 59 tank. Therefore, in the late 1950s the PLA Ground Force submitted requirements for a light tank which could be successfully deployed in the areas of southern China. The development of the Type 62 light tank began at Factory 674 (Harbin First Machinery Building Group Ltd) in 1958. Construction of the first Type 62 light tank prototype, Type 59-16, began in 1960 and ended in 1962. The tank officially entered production and service with the PLA in 1963.

Based on experience gathered during the Sino-Vietnamese War, an update for the Type 62 was designed, consisting of 33 different improvements and was designated Type 62-I.

After an unsuccessful attempt at fitting the Type 62 light tank with the turret from the Type 63A amphibious light tank, a new turret with a 105 mm gun was designed and fitted on the Type 62. This new variant was designated Type 62G.

== Description ==
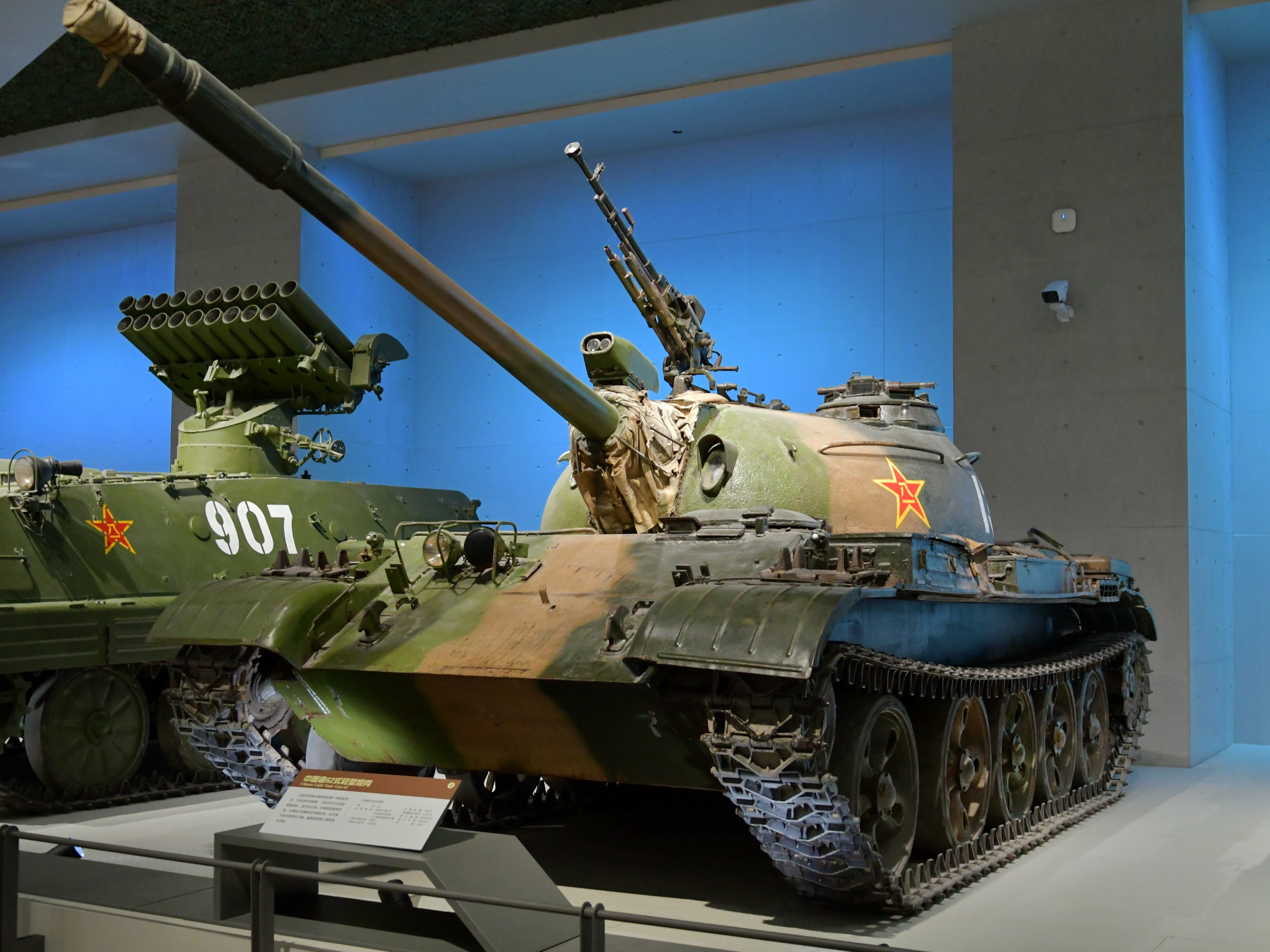
Type 62 tank in Military Museum of the Chinese People's Revolution.

The Type 62 light tank was designed to be a downscaled Type 59 main battle tank, armed with a smaller 85 mm Type 62-85TC rifled main gun and with a much simpler gunner sight and thinner armour in order to reduce overall weight. As such it has a typical tank layout: steering compartment at the front, fighting compartment in the centre and the engine compartment in the back. Although the Type 62 light tank is similar to the Type 59 main battle tank in appearance, it has a smaller hull and turret. The Type 62 light tank was given a four-man crew configuration, with the driver seated on the left hand side of the front of the hull, the tank commander and gunner seated on the left side of the turret in a tandem formation and the loader on the right hand side of the rear of the turret. The driver's hatch is located on the left hand side of the front of the hull, directly in front of the turret. It has three periscope vision blocks which provide the driver with forward vision. The centre vision block may be removed and replaced with a low-light periscope with a 50 m vision range. The left hand side turret hatch also has a periscope vision block on top of it and is most probably used by the commander. There is another periscope vision block in the front of each turret hatch. Apart from his usual duty of reloading the gun after it has been fired by the gunner, the loader is also responsible for operating the 12.7 mm Type 54 anti-aircraft heavy machine gun mounted on the turret's roof.

Primary armament consists of 85 mm Type 62-85TC rifled main gun with fume extractor almost at the end of the barrel. It is the same gun as the one used in the Type 63 amphibious light tank and can fire AP, APHE, HE, Frag-HE, HEAT, APFSDF-T and smoke rounds. The gun has maximum range of 12,200 m and maximum aimed range of 1,870 m and has a rate of fire of 3 to 5 rounds per minute. The Type 62 light tank is characterized by having poor accuracy, given the primitive optical gun sights that the gunner has to use and lack of a gun stabilizer (which differs it from Chinese main battle tanks), a fire control system and night vision equipment. As a secondary armament the Type 62 light tank was given the 12.7 mm Type 54 anti-aircraft heavy machine gun (Chinese copy of Soviet 12.7 mm DShK 1938/46 heavy machine gun) mounted on a rotatable mount on top of the loader's hatch on the right hand side of the roof of the turret and two 7.62 mm Type 59T medium machine guns, one mounted coaxially with the main gun and the other one mounted at the bow of the tank. Also a 7.62 mm Type 59T anti-aircraft medium machine gun can be additionally fitted to left hand side turret hatch. The cast turret features the Soviet-style half-egg shape. The tank carriers 47 rounds for the 85 mm Type 62-85TC rifled main gun, 2,000 rounds for the two Type 59T medium machine guns and 1,250 rounds for 12.7 mm Type 54 anti-aircraft heavy machine gun.

The Type 62 light tank uses the torsion bar suspension which consists of five road wheels on each side with a prominent gap between the first and second road wheel and an even space between second, third, fourth and fifth road wheel. The road wheels are smaller and lighter than those from the Type 59 main battle tank. The track is driven by a drive sprocket at the rear, with an idler at the front. There are no return rollers. In effort to reduce the overall weight of the tank the original 12150L 12-cylinder liquid-cooled diesel engine from Type 59 main battle tank was powered down from 523 hp (390 kW) to 430 hp (321 kW). This modified version of the 12150L engine weighs considerably less and was designated 12150L-3. This new engine gave the Type 62 a maximum road speed of 60 km/h, maximum cross country speed of 35 km/h, maximum road operational range of 500 km and power-to-weight ratio of 20.5 hp/tonne (15.3 kW/tonne). The tank can cross 0.8 m high vertical obstacles, 2.85 m trenches, 30° side slopes and ford 1.4 m deep water obstacles (5 m when equipped with a snorkel).

The Type 62 light tank is protected by steel armour. The front armour on the turret is 50 mm thick while armour thickness on the hull armour varies from 15 mm to 35 mm. The armour of the Type 62 is so thin that any light anti-tank weapon (like hand-held rocket-propelled grenade (RPG) launchers) can perforate the frontal plate.

the Type 62 light tank is equipped with a radio for which it has an antenna on the left hand side of the turret, in front of the left hand side turret hatch. It is also equipped with a dome shaped ventilator on the right hand side of the turret in the front of the loader's hatch. The tank can be fitted with Type 762 light mine clearance system and Type 762A light multi-purpose mine-clearance system in the front of the hull. There are spots for stowage boxes and additional fuel tanks on both fenders; four on the right side fender and three on the left. Like the Type 59 main battle tank the Type 62 light tank has a capability to make its own smoke screen by injecting raw diesel fuel into the exhaust manifold.

== Service history ==
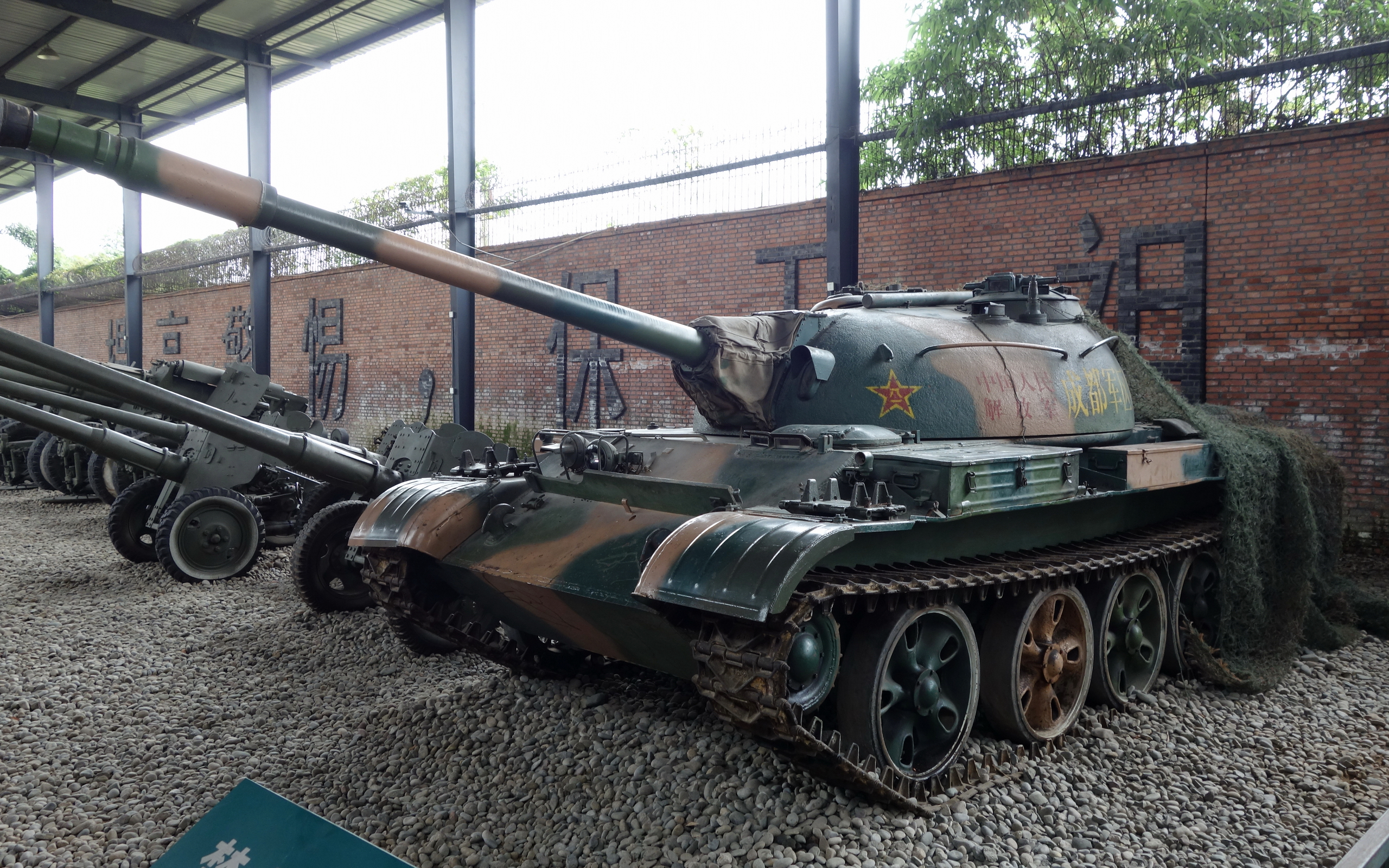
Chinese Type 62 light tank.

Type 62 light tank officially entered production and service with the PLA in 1963. More than 1,393 vehicles were produced between 1963 and 1989 when it ended. The Type 62 was primarily deployed in Southern China. The most famous unit to operate the Type 62 light tanks is the recon battalion directly attached to the 43rd Army HQ, Guangzhou Military Region.

In 1979 it saw combat against the PAVN during the Cambodia-Vietnamese War, when the Khmer Rouge used a large number of Type 62 tanks supplied by China, and the Sino–Vietnamese War, when the PLA used about two hundred tanks, mostly Type 62s. They suffered severe losses in combat due to tank's poor protection as the tank's thin armour could be easily penetrated by hand-held rocket-propelled grenade (RPG) launchers. An upgrade package was developed for the Type 62 soon after the war and was designated Type 62-I. Based on the improvement programs after the Sino–Vietnamese War, the Type 62 was found to be too lightly armoured and too poorly armed to be used as a normal tank. Of the two hundred tanks which invaded Vietnam about half were knocked out, underscoring the Type 62's lack of armour and armament. Since then the Type 62 has been shifted to secondary duties in Southern China, such as reconnaissance, fire support and combat with enemy lightly armoured vehicles.

400 Type 62 light tanks had been upgraded to Type 62-I and Type 62G standard. The upgrading to Type 62-I standard started in 1979 and upgrading to Type 62G standard started in 2000. It is unknown exactly how many Type 62 light tanks were upgraded or what units operate the upgraded variants but in January 2005 CCTV showed two Type 62G light tanks belonging to an artillery regiment, Guangzhou MR and the tanks are serving as the recon company of this regiment. The Type 62 tank was retired from Chinese service in early 2013. The Type 15 light tank is considered as the effective successor to the Type 62 light tank.

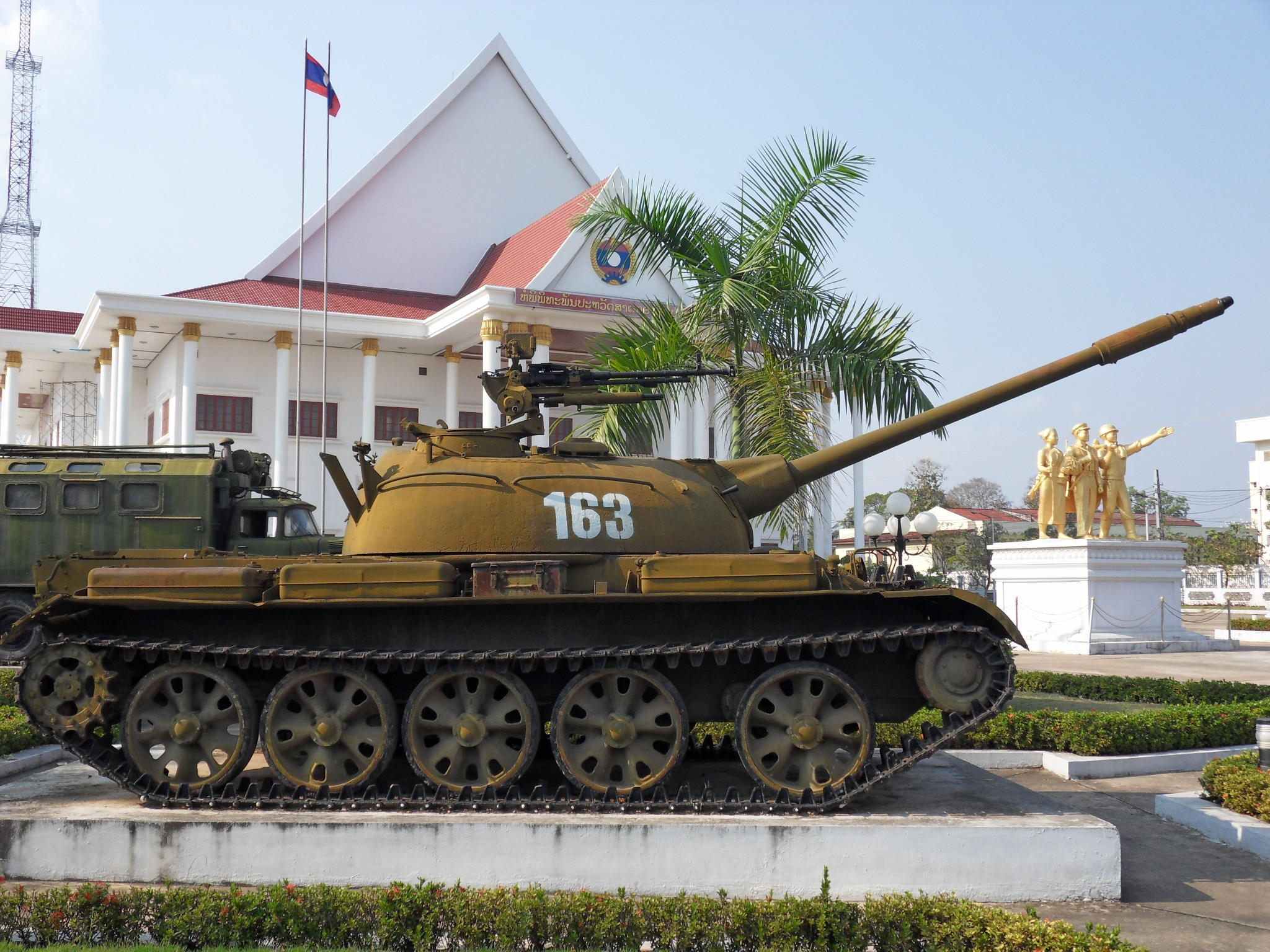
Chinese-made Type 62 light tank in Vientiane, Laos.

The Type 62 has also been exported widely. Foreign nations which field, or have fielded, the Type 62 include North Korea, Cambodia, Bangladesh, Tanzania, Democratic Republic of Congo, Republic of the Congo, Mali, Albania and Sudan. There is a lot of confusion concerning the North Korean Ch'ŏnma-ho main battle tank, which is sometimes considered to be an upgrade of Type 62 light tank. This is incorrect as the Ch'ŏnma-ho main battle tank is based on the Soviet T-62 main battle tank. This originated from the fact that many times tanks like the Type 59 and Type 62 are listed as T-59 and T-62. This leads to much confusion which in turn leads to, for example, listing Albania as a T-62 main battle tank operator and calling the Ch'ŏnma-ho main battle tank an upgrade of Type 62 light tank. It's not clear which nations still have them in service, although based on available knowledge it seems that all original users still have it either on active or reserve status except for North Korea which didn't have them in service as of 1995.

In Africa, the Type 62 was the standard tank of the Tanzanian Armed Forces during the Uganda–Tanzania War in 1978–1979, alongside the larger Type 59. Some Zairian Type 62 were deployed during the last days of the First Congo War but they were abandoned by their crew without firing a shot. Still in service with the new forces armées congolaises in 1998, many were captured by the Rwandan Patriotic Army and the Rally for Congolese Democracy–Goma during the Second Congo War. Particularly, Type 62 tanks driven by ex-Zairian soldiers spearheaded the Rwandan attack on Kinshasa.

== Variants ==
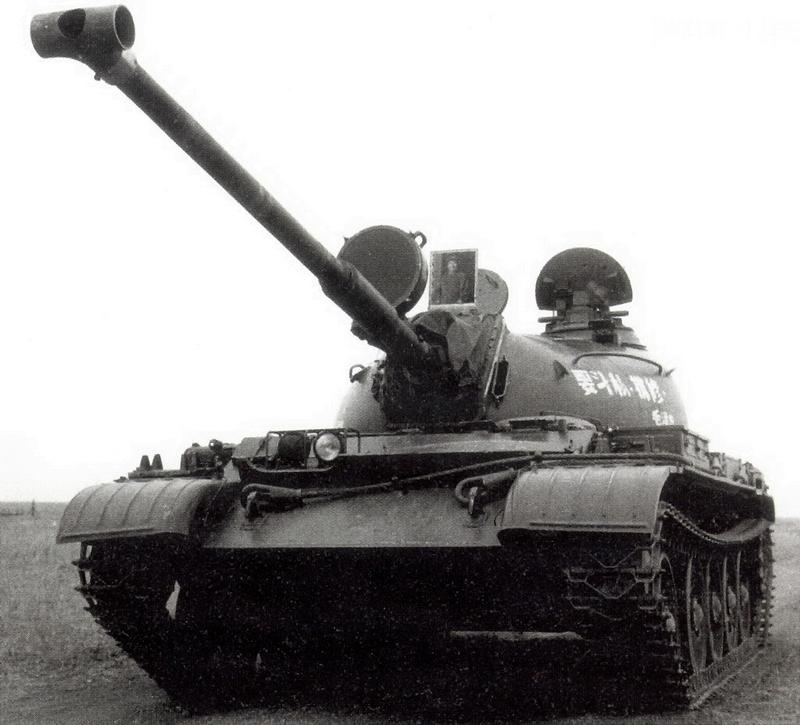
WZ-131-1 Prototype Light Tank.

=== People's Republic of China ===
- Type 62 – Scaled down, lightly armed and thinly armoured variant of the Type 59. It is also known under its industrial designation, WZ-131.
  - Type 62-I – Type 62 upgrade designed basing on the experience gathered during the Sino-Vietnamese War. It features 33 different improvements including an external double lens laser range finder mounted above the mantlet of the 85 mm Type 62-85TC rifled main gun for better firing accuracy and a shield for the 12.7 mm Type 54 anti-aircraft heavy machine gun. It is also known under its industrial designation, WZ-131A.
    - Type 62-I fitted with external turret storage racks and hull sideskirts for additional protection against HEAT projectiles and anti-tank missiles. It is a late model.
  - Type 62G (G stands for Gai – "Improved") – Most recent Type 62 light tank upgrade with improved armour layout and original cast turret replaced by a new welded flat-plate turret which also incorporates an improved armour layout as well as four smoke grenade dischargers on each side of the turret. It is armed with a more powerful low-recoil PLZ-98 105 mm rifled main gun with fume extractor in centre of barrel, vertical stabilization system, modern fire-control system, and night vision equipment.
  - Type 70 – Rebuild Type 62 and like the Type 62-I it is fitted with an external double lens laser range finder mounted above the mantlet of the 85 mm Type 62-85TC rifled main gun but without the shield around the AA HMG. It also has improved sights and a gun stabilization system.
  - Type 79 – Experimental armoured recovery vehicle based on Type 62 light tank.
  - GJT 211 – Armoured bulldozer based on Type 62 light tank chassis.
  - GSL 110B – An armored mine clearing variant equipped with a 24-tube 252mm demining charge launcher.
  - GSL 131 – Mine clearing variant of the GSL 211. It is also known as Type 82.

=== Bangladesh ===
- Type 62 Improvised SPG – A Type 62 fitted with a new turret mounting a 105 mm OTO Melara Mod. 56 howitzer. Twenty-two were converted, serving for some time before they were likely decommissioned and scrapped after 2010.
- Type 62 Improvised IFV – A Type 62 with the main gun replaced by an autocannon. Not much information is available, and the claims for the main armament vary, but is likely a 37 mm autocannon from the 61-K family.
- Type 62 Improvised APC – A Type 62 with the main gun removed. From available photographs, only the roof-mounted 12.7 mm machine gun and hull mounted 7.62 mm machine gun were preserved with no additional weapons. Claims on the troop capacity vary, ranging between 5 and 10 soldiers. Fourteen were converted and serviced until likely being scrapped after 2010.

== Operators ==
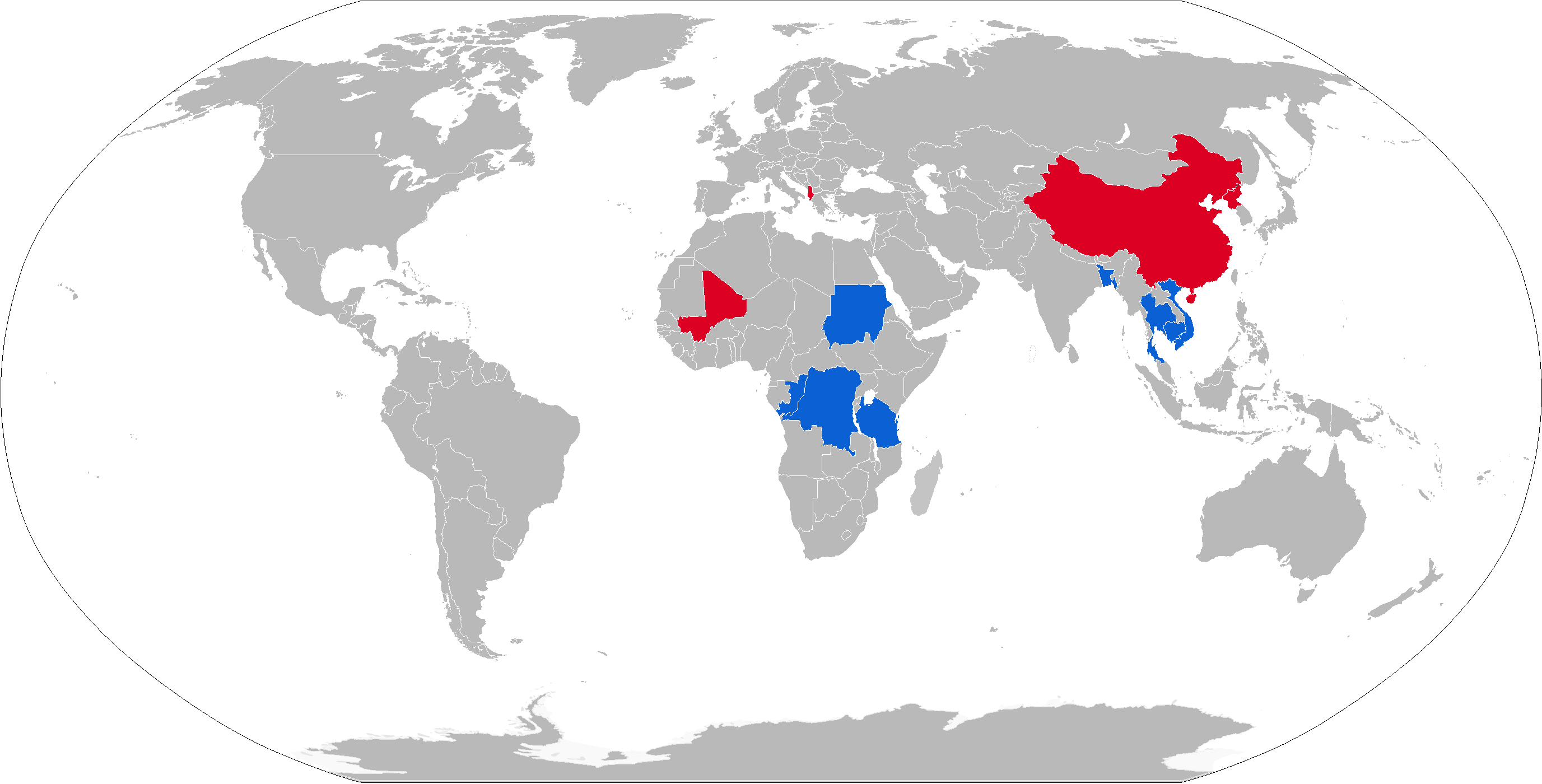
Map of Type 62 operators in blue with former operators in red

=== Current operators ===
- Bangladesh – 36 ordered in 1984 from China and delivered in 1985. 8 in service as of 2020.
- Cambodia – 30, including 20, ordered in 1977 from China and delivered in 1978.
- Congo-Brazzaville – ~14 delivered in 1971, Currently 10 are in service.
- Congo-Kinshasa – 30, from Zaire
- Myanmar – GLS-131 mine clearance variant
- Sudan – 70 ordered in 1970 from China and delivered between 1971 and 1973.
- Tanzania – 66, including 30, ordered in 1969 from China and delivered between 1970 and 1972.
- Thailand – 30

=== Former operators ===
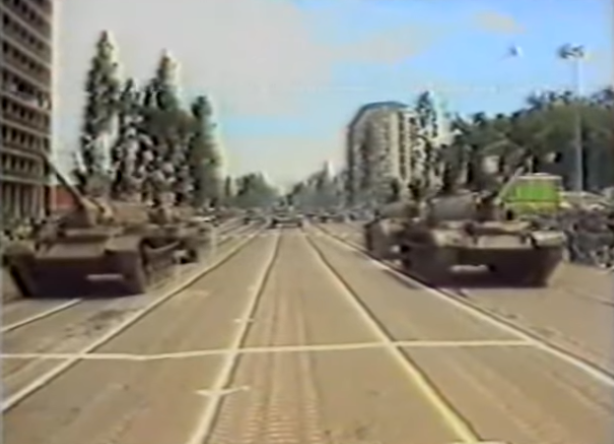
Zairian Type 62s during a military parade in Kinshasa, 1985.

- Albania – 35 received in 1970
- China – More than 1,499 produced. 800 in service as of 1985, 1990, 1995, 2000, and 2003. 400 modernized in service as of 2005. Retired in early 2013, replaced by ZTQ-15.
- Mali – 18 ordered in 1980 from PRC and delivered in 1981. None in service in 2011.
- Myanmar – 105 Type-62 tanks
- North Korea – 50 ordered in 1971 from China and delivered between 1971 and 1972. They remained in service as of 1985 and 1990. There were none known to be in service as of 1995.
- Vietnam – Captured from the Khmer Rouge
- Zaire – 70 delivered in 1975–1976.

== Notes ==
- International Institute for Strategic Studies (February 2021). The Military Balance 2021. Vol. 121. Routledge. ISBN 9781032012278.
