= WZ-111 heavy tank =

Chinese heavy tank prototype

WZ-111 Heavy Tank
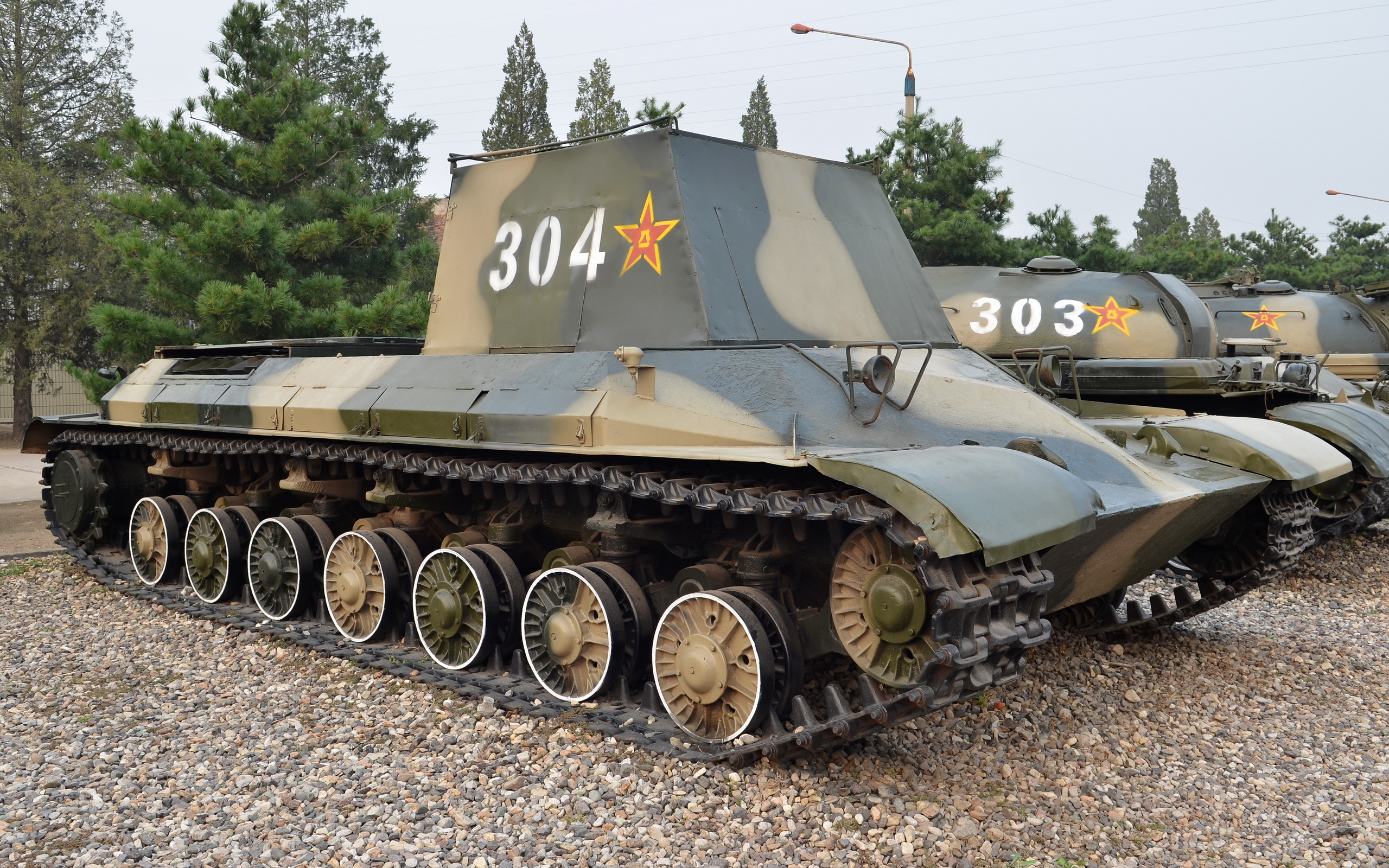
- WZ-111 hull at the Tank Museum, Beijing
- Type: Heavy tank
- Place of origin: China

Specifications
- Mass: 44 to 46 tons (based on a specific variant as none was finished, beside a single prototype)
- Length: 10.625 m (with the gun facing forward)
- Width: 3.3 m
- Height: 2.497 m
- Crew: 4 (The commander, the loader, the gunner and the driver)
- Armor: 80 to 200 mm
- Main armament: 122 mm "Y-174" main gun
- Secondary armament: 1 x 12.7 mm DShK heavy machine gun 2 x 7.62 mm medium machine guns (one co-axial and one mounted on the hull's right-side front)
- Engine: 12-cylinder supercharged diesel engine attached with a radiator 750 HP (or 559 kW)
- Power/weight: 12.71 kW/t (or 17.05 hp/t) based on 44 tonne minimum weight
- Suspension: Torsion-bar suspension system

The WZ-111 heavy tank (Chinese: WZ-111重型坦克) was a heavy tank that was developed by the People's Republic of China (PRC) during the 1960s but was eventually cancelled in 1966 due to many mechanical problems.

== History ==
The WZ-111 featured a 750 hp (560 kW) supercharged diesel engine and a torsion bar suspension system. The idler wheels were in front with drive sprockets in the rear. Many of the suspension components were the same type used in Soviet heavy tank designs such as the IS-2.

The first prototype testing phase began in 1964. This prototype lacked a turret, but was fitted with a steel weight to simulate the actual mass of the turret during the tests. Because of many technological problems that surfaced during testing, the design was shelved around 1966. A WZ-111 tank hull is now displayed at the Tank Museum near Beijing.

== See also ==
- WZ-132
- Type 69
