= Wang Hongguang =

Chinese lieutenant general

- 王洪光

Deputy Commander of Nanjing Military Region
- In office December 2005 – December 2012
- Leader: Zhu Wenquan; Zhao Keshi; Cai Yingting

Head of the General Equipment Support Bureau of People's Liberation Army General Armaments Department
- In office September 2002 – December 2005

President of the People's Liberation Army Armored Forces Academy
- In office February 1998 – September 2002

Personal details
- Born: August 1949 (age 76) Xintai, Shandong, China
- Party: Chinese Communist Party
- Spouse: Gao Yanyan
- Relations: Gao Houliang (father-in-law)
- Children: 1
- Parent: Wang Jianqing

Military service
- Allegiance: People's Republic of China
- Branch/service: People's Liberation Army Ground Force
- Years of service: 1968–2012
- Rank: Lieutenant general
- Commands: Nanjing Military Region

Wang Hongguang (Chinese: 王洪光; pinyin: Wáng Hóngguāng; born August 1949) is a retired lieutenant general in the Chinese People's Liberation Army (PLA).

== Biography ==
Born in 1949, Wang enlisted in the People's Liberation Army in March 1968. He attained the rank of major general (shaojiang) in 1998. In February 1998 he was appointed president of the People's Liberation Army Armored Forces Academy. He was head of the General Equipment Support Bureau of People's Liberation Army General Armaments Department in September 2002, a position he held until December 2005, when he was transferred to Nanjing, Jiangsu and appointed deputy commander of Nanjing Military Region. He was promoted to the rank of lieutenant general (Zhongjiang) in July 2007. He retired from military service in December 2012.

He was a delegate to the 10th National People's Congress and a member of the 12th Chinese People's Political Consultative Conference.

== Personal life ==
Wang's father is Wang Jianqing, a major general in the People's Liberation Army (PLA). Wang married Gao Yanyan (高燕燕), daughter of Gao Houliang, who was also a major general in the People's Liberation Army Air Force. The couple have a son. They divorced in 2015.

== Book ==
- 绝战：追思金门战役 [Remembrance of Kinmen Campaign] (in Chinese). Nanjing, Jiangsu: Jiangsu Education Press. 2011. ISBN 9787549910335.
