= Type 63 (tank) =

Chinese amphibious light tank

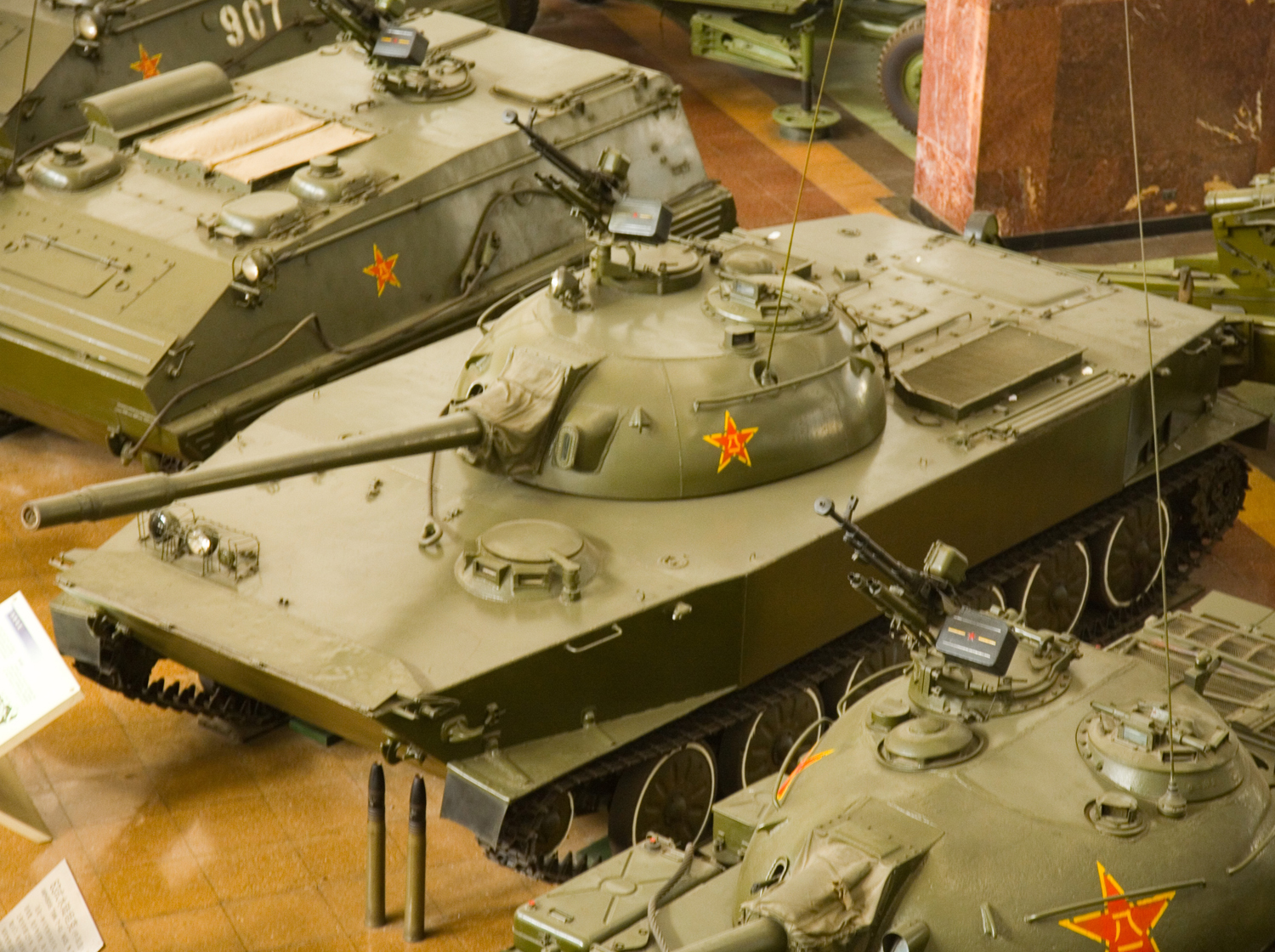
- Chinese Type 63-I tank at the China People's Revolution Military Museum.
- Type: Amphibious light tank
- Place of origin: China

Service history
- In service: 1963–present
- Used by: See Operators
- Wars: See Combat History

Production history
- Designer: Military Engineering Institute (MEI) and the No. 60 Research Institute of Fifth Ministry of Machine Building
- Designed: 1960 - 1963
- Manufacturer: Norinco; Factory 615 Shaanxi Weiyang Diesel Engine Plant (陕西渭阳柴油机厂) and Factory 256 Southwest Vehicles Factory (西南车辆制造厂)
- Produced: 1963 - ? (ended)
- No. built: More than 1,550
- Variants: See Variants

Specifications (Type 63-I)
- Mass: 19.83 tonnes
- Length: 8.44 m 7.15 m (hull only)
- Width: 3.2 m
- Height: 3.122 m (with the AA HMG); 2.522 m (without the AA HMG)
- Crew: 4 (commander, gunner, loader, driver)
- Armor: Welded rolled steel 11 mm hull front 14 mm hull upper side 10 mm hull rear 10 mm hull bottom 10 mm hull top
- Main armament: 85 mm Type 62-85TC rifled gun (47 rounds)
- Secondary armament: 7.62 mm Type 59T coaxial medium machine gun (2,000 rounds); 12.7 mm Type 54 anti-aircraft heavy machine gun (500 rounds); 7.62 mm Type 59T anti-aircraft medium machine gun (optional)
- Engine: 12150L-2 12-cylinder liquid-cooled diesel 402 hp (300 kW) at 2,000 rpm
- Power/weight: 20.3 hp/tonne (15.1 kW/tonne)
- Transmission: Manual, planetary
- Suspension: torsion bar
- Ground clearance: 400 mm
- Fuel capacity: 545 litres
- Operational range: 370 km (road); 340 km (cross country); 120 km (water)
- Maximum speed: 64+ km/h (road); 30+ km/h (cross country); 12 km/h (water)

The Norinco Type 63 (Chinese: 63式; pinyin: Liùsān shì) is a Chinese amphibious light tank. First fielded in 1963, it is in many ways similar to the earlier Soviet PT-76. However, contrary to popular belief, it does have some essential differences from the PT-76 in the vehicle's waterjet propulsion system, etc. It is also known under its industrial designation, the WZ-211. Type 63 is being replaced by Type 63A.

== Development history ==
The Chinese received several PT-76 light amphibious tanks from the Soviet Union in the mid-1950s. However, due to their unsatisfactory performance, the People's Liberation Army (PLA) rejected them. Therefore, in October 1958, the PLA decided to develop a domestic amphibious tank based on the PT-76 design. The development program was carried out by 201 Institute and the 615 Factory. A prototype known as WZ-211 (Type 60) was built and tested in 1959, but the design suffered from a number of problems including engine overheating. The PLA wasn't satisfied with the performance of the vehicle, which led to the development of an improved version. It was jointly developed by Military Engineering Institute (MEI) and the No. 60 Research Institute of Fifth Ministry of Machine Building. The prototype was completed in 1962 and was sent to Norinco Factory 615, the Shaanxi Weiyang Diesel Engine Plant (陕西渭阳柴油机厂), for continued research. After it later passed the extensive trials (mostly dealing with crossing river, lake and sea water obstacles), the amphibious light tank was finally approved for design finalization in April 1963, and was officially designated Type 63.

== Description ==
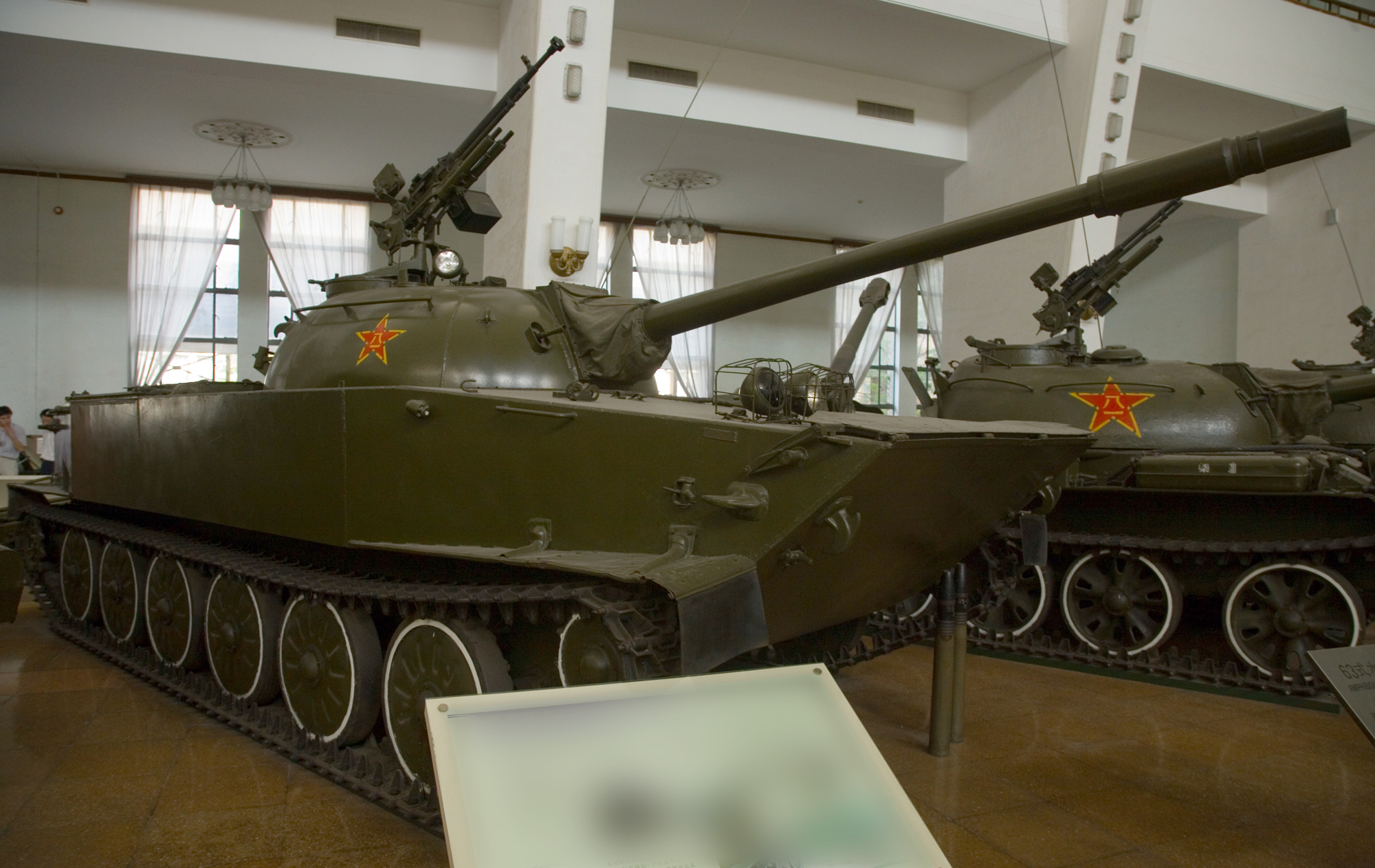
Chinese Type 63-I amphibious light tank seen from the front right at the China People's Revolution Military Museum.

=== Overview ===
Type 63 has a typical tank layout: steering compartment at the front, fighting compartment in the center, and the engine compartment in the back. Although it is externally similar to PT-76, it has some essential differences from its Soviet equivalent. Instead of a three-man crew on the PT-76, the Type 63 has a four-man crew for better efficiency. Unlike in the PT-76, where the driver's station is located in the center of the front of the hull, the Type 63 has the driver's station located on the left-hand side of the front of the hull. The driver has a round hatch with three periscope vision blocks over his station. Gunner and commander have their stations in the left-hand side of the turret, and the loader has his on the right-hand side of the turret. The turret has two hatches. The right turret hatch opens backwards and has a mount for 12.7 mm Type 54 anti-aircraft heavy machine gun. The left turret hatch opens forward, has a periscope vision block, and can be fitted with the 7.62 mm Type 59T anti-aircraft medium machine gun. There's a dome-shaped ventilator behind the hatches.

The tank is wider and higher than the PT-76. The Type 63 has a flat, boat-like hull similar to the design of the PT-76, apart from a nearly horizontal glacis plate, a higher gradient of the bottom of the bow, different engine grills with three separate vertical slot side air inlets on the Type 63, in contrast to the single large inlet with an inset vertical baffle plate on the PT-76. There's also a slight bulge in the center of each side of the hull (hull sides in PT-76 are smooth). Also, the tracks are mounted higher, and the roadwheels are bigger. The half-egg-shaped, cast turret, which is sometimes considered to be a modified Type 62 turret, is actually a modified Type 60 turret. It is placed in the center of the vehicle (unlike in PT-76, which has the turret closer to the front of the vehicle) and has a ventilator dome with a snorkel fitting. Apart from his usual duty of reloading the gun after it has been fired by the gunner, the loader is also responsible for operating the 12.7 mm Type 54 anti-aircraft heavy machine gun mounted on the turret's roof.

=== Armaments and electronics ===
The weapons array consists of the 85 mm Type 62-85TC rifled gun, the 7.62 mm Type 59T coaxial medium machine gun, and the 12.7 mm Type 54 anti-aircraft heavy machine gun, which is a Chinese copy of the Soviet 12.7 mm DShK 1938/46 heavy machine gun. Also, a 7.62 mm Type 59T anti-aircraft medium machine gun can be additionally fitted to the left-hand side turret hatch. 85 mm Type 62-85TC rifled gun is the same gun as the one fitted in the Type 62 light tank and can fire AP, APHE, HE, Frag-HE, HEAT, APFSDF-T, and smoke rounds. The gun has a maximum range of 12,200 m and a maximum aimed range of 1,870 m and has a rate of fire of eight rounds per minute. The gun is not stabilized and is aimed via an optical gun sight. It can be elevated or depressed between +22 and -4 degrees. The Type 63 amphibious light tank is characterized by having poor accuracy, given the primitive optical gun sights that the gunner has to use and the lack of proper gun stabilizer, fire control system, and night vision equipment.

Type 63 amphibious light tanks are also equipped with a man-portable anti-aircraft missile launcher, which is fired by a crew member standing in one of the turret hatches. Type 63 cannot fire its main gun while it swims due to the lack of fire control systems. The vehicle carries 47 rounds for the 85 mm Type 62-85TC rifled gun, 2000 rounds for the 7.62 mm Type 59T medium machine gun(s) and 500 rounds for the 12.7 mm Type 54 anti-aircraft heavy machine gun.

Type 63 is equipped with an A-221A internal telephone and an A-220A receive/transmit radio, for which it has a radio antenna on the left-hand side of the center of the turret. It also has two IR driving lights on the right-hand side of the hull and an IR searchlight on the right-hand side of the turret.

=== Protection ===
The hull of the Type 63 is composed of welded rolled steel. The hull is 11 millimetres thick at the front, 14 millimetres thick at the upper sides, and 10 millimetres thick at the rear. The top and bottom of the hull are both 10 millimetres thick. This gives it protection against 7.62 mm calibre small arms fire and small artillery shell fragments, but it is not sufficient to protect from either heavy machine gun fire or bigger artillery shell fragments. The tracks aren't protected by any armour and are easily damaged.

=== Mobility ===
The torsion bar suspension consists of six road wheels with the drive sprocket at the rear and the idler at the front. The suspension doesn't have return rollers. The track is composed of metal and is 2.82 meters long. The first limited production variant of Type 63 was powered by the same 6-cylinder 4-stroke inline water-cooled diesel engine developing 241 hp (180 kW) at 1800 rpm as the one used in the early Type 60 amphibious light tank. The second production run, designated Type 63-I, was given the more powerful 12150L-2 12-cylinder liquid-cooled diesel engine, which developed 402 hp (300 kW) at 2,000 rpm. The more powerful engine gave the Type 63-I a maximum road speed of 64 kilometres per hour and a maximum cross-country speed of 30 km/h. The Type 63 can cross 2.9-meter-wide trenches and 0.87-meter-high vertical obstacles, as well as climb 60° gradients and handle 38° side slopes. The vehicle has a manual, planetary transmission system with five forward gears and one reverse gear. The tank can be fitted with additional fuel tanks to increase the vehicle's operational range.

Type 63 is amphibious thanks to its flat boat-shaped hull. Preparation for swimming involves switching on the bilge pumps, erecting the trim vane at the front of the vehicle, and switching the driver's periscope vision blocks for a swimming periscope vision block that enables the driver to see over the trim vane. The trim-vane improves the vehicle's stability and displacement in water and prevents water from flooding the bow of the tank. When not in use, the trim vane is placed in its laying position in the front of the bow over the barrel of the main gun and serves as additional armour. Like the PT-76, it is propelled in the water by two water jets, one on each side of the hull, with the jet exits at the rear of the tank; however, it has its entrances located in the front of the vehicle and not in the bottom as in the case of PT-76. Unlike the PT-76, the Type 63 also uses its moving tracks to swim. The waterjet propulsion system gives it a maximum swimming speed of 12 kilometres per hour and a top swimming range of 120 kilometres.

== Service history ==
Type 63 entered production and service in 1963. The initial production variant was quickly replaced by the Type 63-I, which had a more powerful engine, the Model 12150-L2 12-cylinder liquid-cooled diesel engine. In all, more than 1,550 Type 63 and Type 63-I amphibious light tanks were made. The tank was designed to operate in the wetland regions and rice paddy fields of southern China (duties also performed by the earlier non-amphibious Type 62 light tank). The Type 63 was intended for inland river and lake crossing operations and amphibious landing in the coastal regions, and can swim long distances in harsh sea conditions at high speeds. It can also support infantry in the attack and engage lightly armoured vehicles and fortifications. It can also be used in reconnaissance and patrol roles. Type 63's high amphibious ability was proved in 1966 when it crossed the 31 km long Qiongzhou Strait between mainland China and the Hainan island.

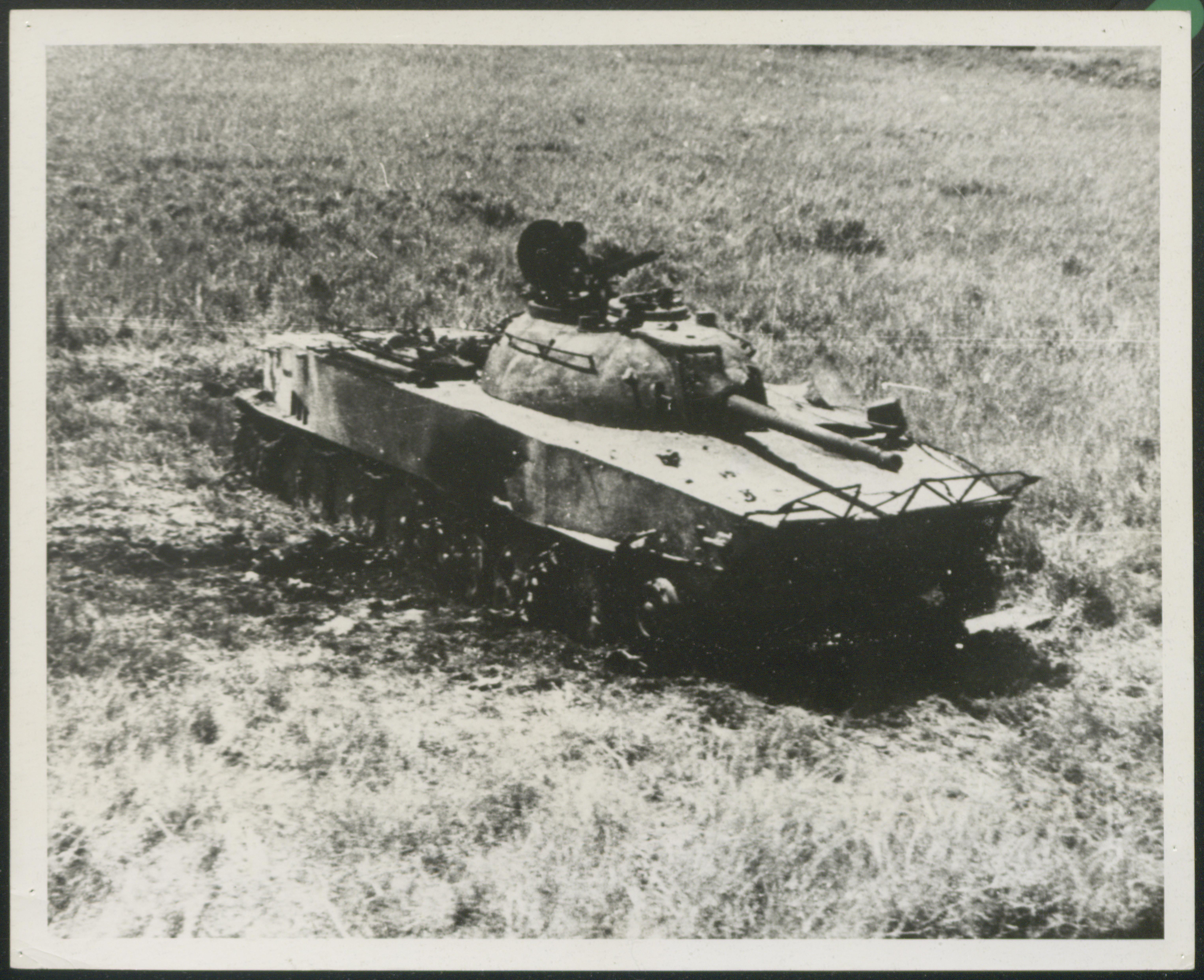
Type 63 destroyed during the Vietnam War

Later, the tank was also adopted by the People's Liberation Army Marine Corps for the amphibious assault operations along with various other amphibious units stationed near the Taiwan straits. Some Type 63 and Type 63-I amphibious light tanks were upgraded to the Type 63-II standard in the 1970s. The original Type 63 and Type 63-I amphibious light tanks have been gradually phased out since the late 1990s and replaced by the more capable Type 63A, which entered service in 1997. The PRC currently has an estimated number of 800 of both types, though only around 300 of these are Type 63A, Type 63A-I, and Type 63A-II, the remainder being Type 63-II and old Type 63 and Type 63-I amphibious light tanks. The original Type 63 and Type 63-I amphibious light tanks are kept in reserve for training purposes. Because the Type 63A was mostly designed for amphibious operations against Taiwan, it is presumed that it would be the basic vehicle used in an amphibious invasion of Taiwan Island.

The Type 63 was exported to Albania, Cambodia, Iraq, North Korea, Myanmar, Pakistan, Sri Lanka, and Vietnam. It saw action during the final phases of the Vietnam War, the Sino-Vietnamese War, and the Sri Lankan Civil War. During the Gulf War, the Iraqis used Type 63 tanks in their attack on the Saudi city of Khafiji. The Saudis attempted to reconquer the city with the support of a Qatari battalion with French AMX-30 tanks. There were a few tank-to-tank engagements due to the clumsy maneuvering of both sides. However, the few armored clashes resulted systematically with the victory of the much heavier and modern French model.

By all accounts, the Type 63 showed great mobility in terrains that are difficult for heavy tanks, but its thin armour has caused heavy losses and casualties.

== Variants ==
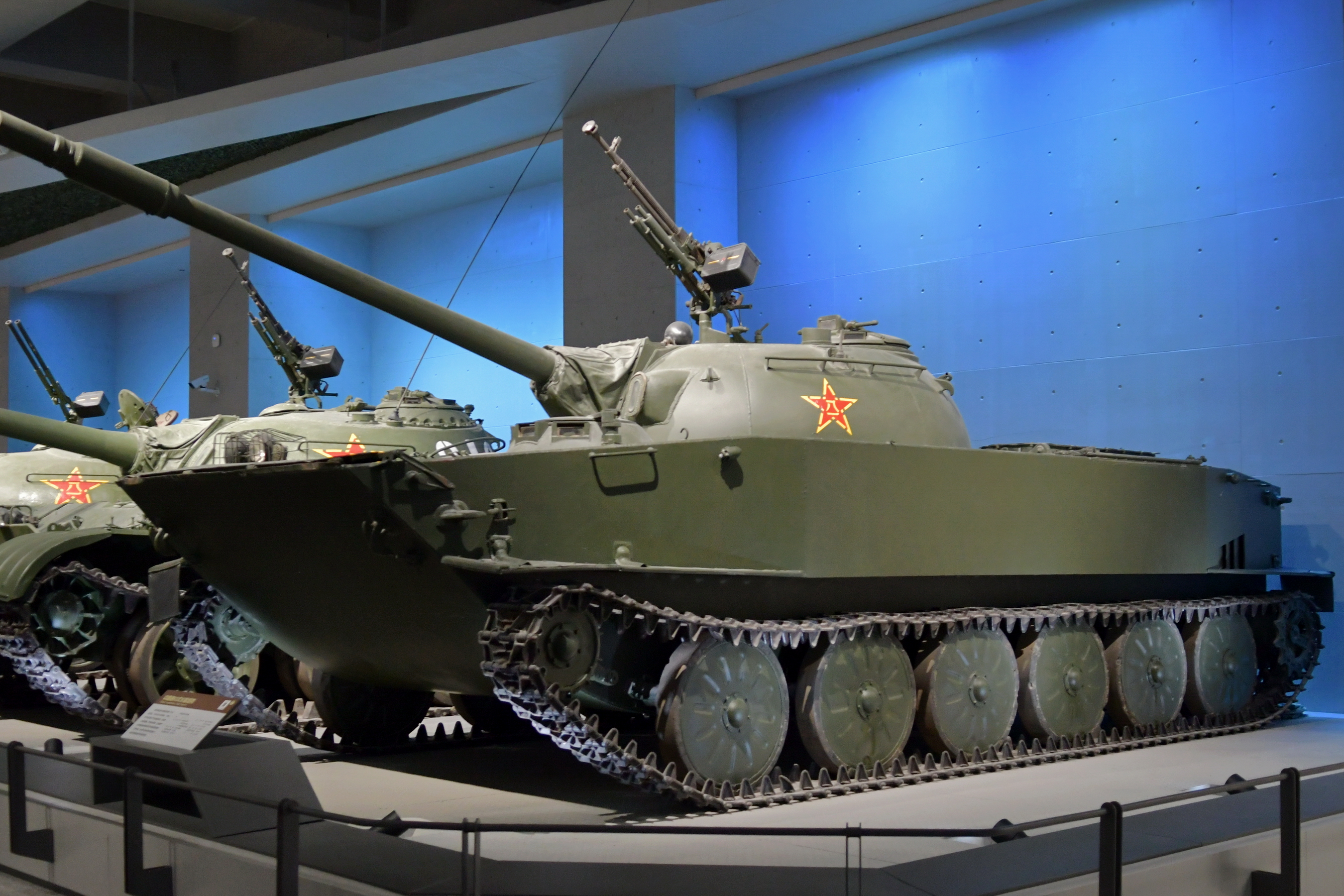
Type 63 Amphibious tank.

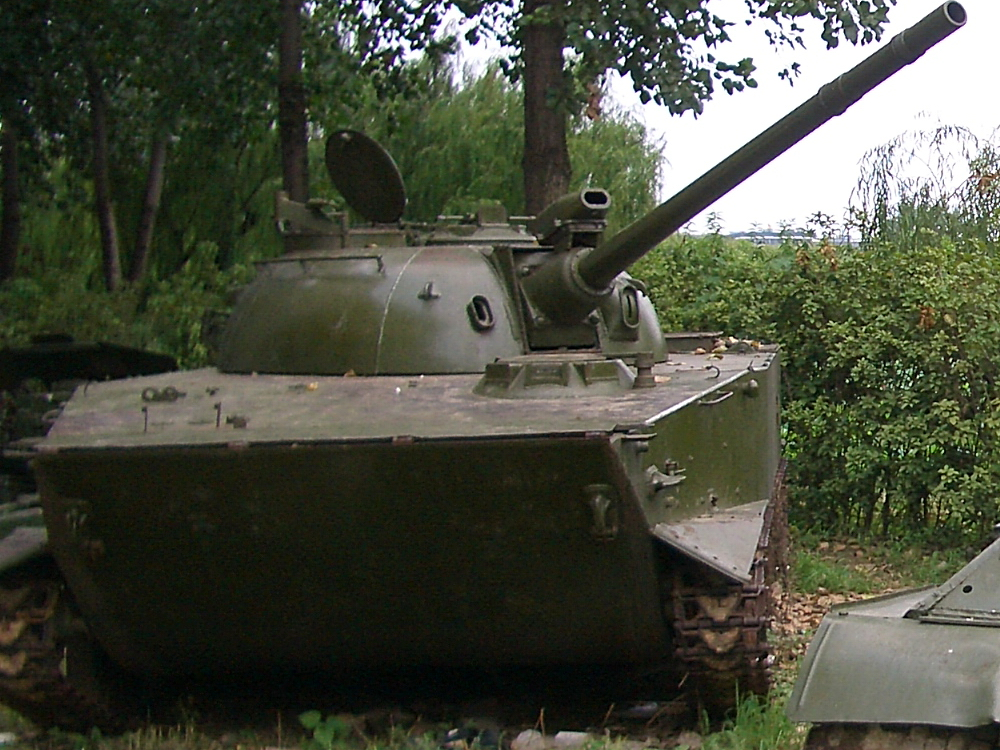
Type 63-2 Amphibious tank.

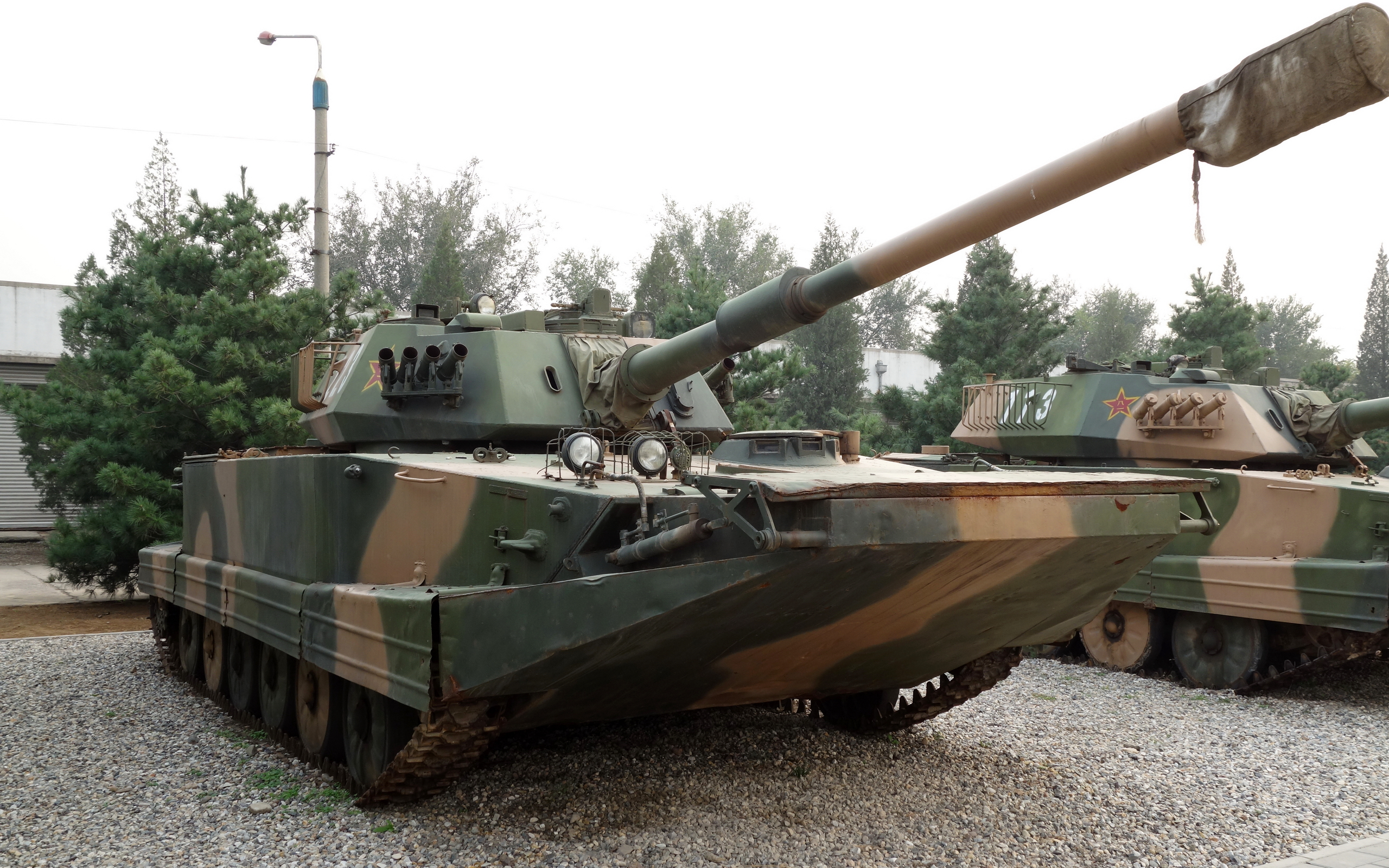
Type 63A Amphibious tank.

- Type 63 - Basic amphibious light tank with half-egg-shape turret, armed with 85 mm Type 62-85TC rifled gun and powered by the 6-cylinder 4-stroke inline water-cooled diesel engine developing 240 hp (179 kW) at 1800 rpm from the Type 60 amphibious light tank. It entered service in 1963 and produced in small numbers. The industrial designator is WZ211.
  - Type 63-I - Type 63 fitted with a new 12150-L2 12-cylinder liquid-cooled diesel engine developing 402 hp (300 kW) at 2,000 rpm. The industrial designator is WZ211-1.
    - Type 63-II - Type 63-I fitted with the infrared night vision equipment and Norinco external laser rangefinder, which is the same laser rangefinder as the one fitted on Type 59-I main battle tank. This update was made in the 1970s. The industrial designator is WZ211-2.
    - Type 63HG (HG stands for Hai Gai - "Sea Modification") - Prototype vehicle with improved amphibious capabilities. It has a rounded bow nose extension. The hull was enhanced to improve the vehicle's performance while it is swimming at long distances from the amphibious assault ships to the shore. The swim speed is increased to 30 km/h (16 kn). It also has a new ZPL-83 105 mm rifled gun instead of the original 85 mm Type 62-85TC rifled gun. The new gun features an improved stabilizer, allowing firing on the move. The gun is similar to those that are fitted on the Type 59-II, Type 59D, Type 69 and Type 80 main battle tanks, but with reduced recoil force for firing while the vehicle is swimming. It is capable of firing all types of modern tank rounds, such as armour piercing fin-stabilized discarding sabot (APFSDS), HEAT, and HE. The turret was modified to accommodate the new armament. The cast turret retains its half-egg shape, while three stowage buckets have been added on both sides of the turret and on the rear of the turret. It was made in the mid-1990s. It is also known as the Type 63G, where G stands for Gai - "Improved".
    - Type 63A - Improved Type 63-II. It was specially designed to suit the needs of the marines. Unlike the original Type 63 which was mainly intended for river-crossing operations at inland rivers and lakes, the Type 63A can be launched from amphibious warfare ships 5 – 7 km offshore and travel to the shore with the speed of 28 km/h (which was accomplished thanks to the new engine and redesigned water jet system). It has a new diesel engine developing 581 hp (433 kW) and computerized fire control system which gives it the capacity to shoot while it is on the move on land and on water. Type 63A has a redesigned welded turret with four smoke grenade dischargers on each side of the turret, a stowage bucket in the rear of the turret and two stowage buckets on the sides of the turret. The turret was armed with 105 mm rifled gun instead of the original 85 mm Type 62-85TC rifled gun. It is similar to those that are fitted on the Type 59-II, Type 59D, Type 69 and Type 80 main battle tanks but with reduced recoil force for firing while the vehicle is swimming. It is capable of firing all types of modern tank rounds, such as armour piercing fin-stabilized discarding sabot (APFSDS), HEAT and HE. It also has two extra floating tanks (one in the front and one in the rear) that provide better stability while in water, an improved snorkel fitting and three water inlets on either side of the hull. The tank also has side skirts protecting the tracks. To allow the tank to fire accurately while in water the 105 mm was given the ability to shoot laser-beam guided ATGM. The PRC has developed a 105 mm gun-launched ATGM based on the Russian 9M117 Bastion technology. The missile has a maximum firing range of 4,000 m - 5,000 m, with a single hit probability of over 90% against static targets. The ATGM can also be used to engage low-flying helicopters. The new fire control system includes a digital fire-control computer, integrated commander sight with laser rangefinder input, and light spot or image-stabilized gunner sight with passive night vision. The standard night vision is an image intensifier. Alternatively the gunner sight can be fitted with a thermal imager night vision with a maximum range of 2,100 meters. The tank is also equipped with the satellite positioning (GPS/GLONASS) system so that it can easily locate the correct landing coordinates in all kinds of weather and at day or night conditions. Because of the additional equipment the weight of the vehicle has increased to 22 tonnes and because of the two extra floating tanks (one in the front and one in the rear) and the longer gun, the overall length of the vehicle has increased to 9.6 meters. The Type 63A was designed because of continuing tension with Taiwan and as such it can face Taiwanese M48 and M60 Patton main battle tanks when it has the upper hand. While its thin armour is still a rather big issue the Type 63A has the ability to attack its targets before being directly engaged by using ATGMs. It entered service in 1997. The industrial designator is WZ213. It is also known as Type 63M, Type 99 and ZTS-63A.
      - Type 63A equipped with a wind sensor.
      - Type 63A-I - Type 63A fitted with a bow extension, bigger side skirts which cover the tracks more, attachments points for additional armour on the front of the turret (possibly ERA) and more advanced sighting devices (as evidenced by larger periscopes). It is also known by industrial designator, WZ213-1. It is also known as ZTS63A-1.
      - Type 63A-II - Type 63A-I bolt mounts for additional armour all over the turret and hull sides. It is also known by industrial designator, WZ213-2. It is also known as ZTS63A-2.
    - Type 77 - Chinese tracked amphibious APC based on the Type 63-I amphibious light tank. Although not a clone of the BTR-50, the Type 77 has similar hull shape and layout. The industrial designator is WZ511.
      - Type 77-1 - amphibious armoured personnel/artillery carrier designed to carry a disassembled gun (85 mm towed anti-tank gun or 120 mm towed howitzer) on the roof. The vehicle has hydraulic winch and ramps to load/unload the gun. The industrial designator is WZ511-1.
      - Type 77-2 - amphibious armoured personnel carrier. No winch and ramps. The industrial designator is WZ511-2.
      - Type 76 ARV - recovery vehicle.
      - Type 89 - Type 77 converted into a self-propelled howitzer armed with 122 mm gun. Although most vehicles were based on Type 77 APCs, some vehicles were based on Type 63-I amphibious light tanks.
  - Type 7402 torpedo launcher - Requirement first issued by PLAN Lushun Naval Base, and in 1975, the 201st Research Institute was tasked to develop a torpedo launcher that can fire torpedoes both above and below the surface of the sea. Type 63 was selected as the chassis, with the turret replaced by a twin 533 mm torpedo launcher, and necessary fire control system was added. After prototypes were completed in August 1975, test first begun at the pool of 201st Research Institute. From mid September to early October 1975, intensive tests including night tests in open ocean were successfully completed around the PLAN Lushun Naval Base, and Type 7402 torpedo launching vehicle was accepted into Chinese service. The launcher can operate up to in sea state 4, and a maximum depth of 10 meter, and can operated either independently or in groups. The torpedoes can be fired at maximum rate of one per second. However, series production was delayed due to the political turmoil in China, namely, Cultural Revolution, and after the end of the Cultural Revolution, the production program was eventually canceled during the military downsizing. As a result, Type 7402 torpedo launcher only entered Chinese service in very limited numbers, with only a single unit formed for evaluation purposes.

== Models ==
Characteristics of the Type 63 models
	Type 63	Type 63-I	Type 63-II	Type 63A	Type 63A-I	Type 63A-II
Weight (tonnes)	18.4	19.83	Unknown	22	Unknown
Length	8.44 m (overall); 7.15 m (hull only)			9.6 m (overall)
Main gun	85 mm Type 62-85TC rifled (47 rounds)			105 mm low recoil rifled (45 rounds)
Engine	6-cylinder 4-stroke in-line water-cooled diesel 241 hp (180 kW) at 1,800 rpm	12150L-2; 12-cylinder 4-stroke in-line water-cooled diesel 402 hp (300 kW) at 2,000 rpm		Diesel; 581 hp (433 kW)

== Operators ==
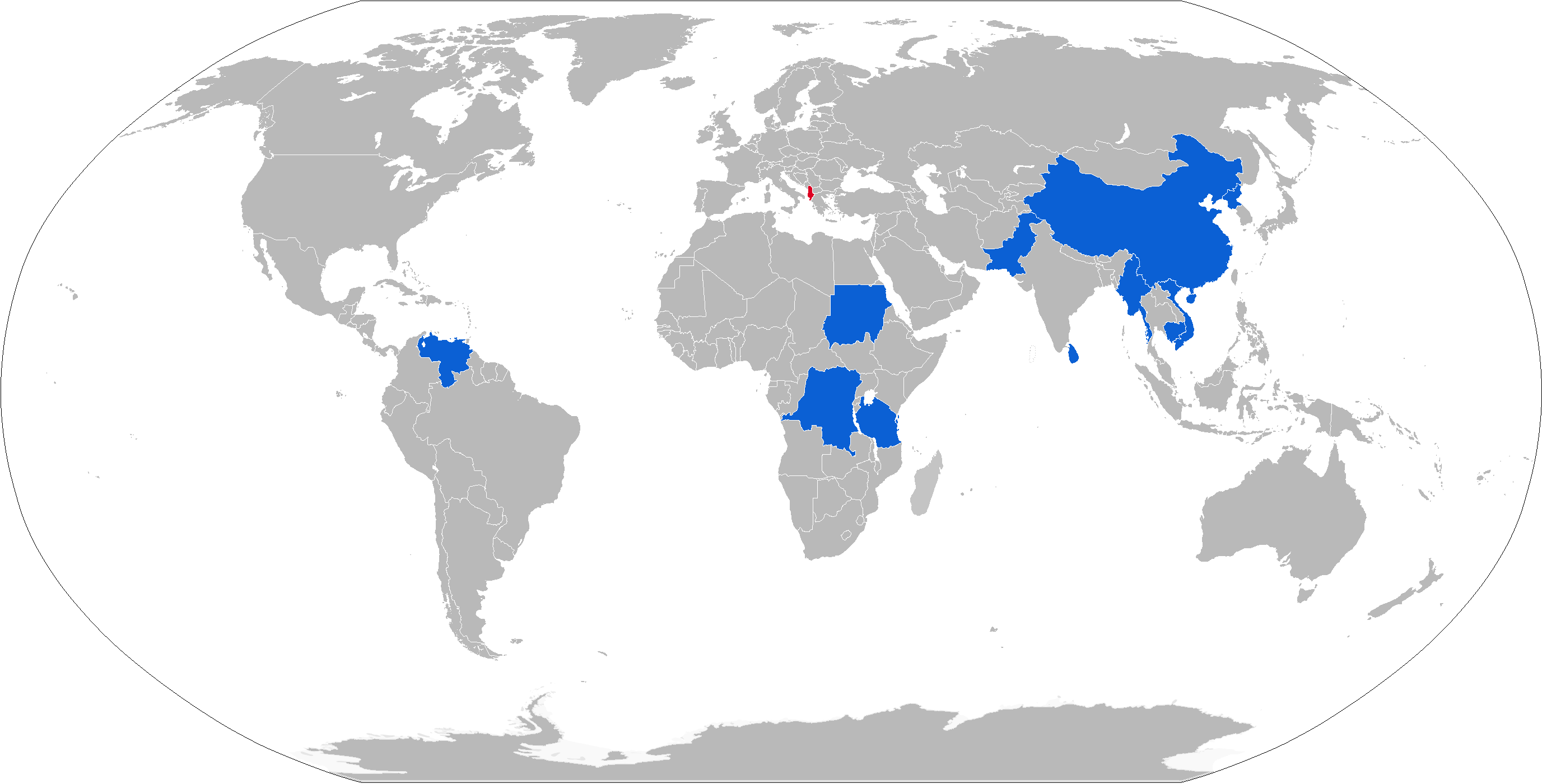
Map of current and former Type 63 operators in blue

=== Current operators ===
- Cambodia - 20
- Congo-Brazzaville - 8
- Myanmar - More than 150 including 55 ordered in 1989 from PRC and delivered between 1989 and 1990 and 50 ordered in 1993 from PRC and delivered in 1993.
- Tanzania - 30 ordered in 1976 from PRC and delivered in 1977 and 1979, ~24 Type 63A received in 2012–2013. More than 2 in service in 2016.
- Venezuela - Venezuelan National Guard
- Vietnam - As K63 light tanks.

=== Former operators ===
- Albania - 200 (all scrapped)
- China
- Pakistan - estimated 80 units, operational status unknown.

== Combat History ==
- Used by the North Vietnamese Army during the Vietnam War, Laotian Civil War and Cambodian Civil War.
- Used by the Pakistan Army during the Indo-Pakistani War of 1971.
- Cambodian–Vietnamese War (1978–1991)
- Sino-Vietnamese War (1979)
- Second Sudanese Civil War (1983–2005)
- Sri Lankan Civil War (1983–2009)
