= List of equipment of the Tanzanian Army =

The equipment of the Tanzanian Army can be subdivided into infantry weapons, armoured personnel carrier and tanks.

== Small arms ==
Name	Image	Caliber	Type	Origin	Notes
Pistols
Browning Hi-Power		9×19mm	Semi-automatic pistol	Belgium; Canada	
CZ 52		7.62×25mm	Semi-automatic pistol	Czechoslovakia	
Stechkin APS		9×18mm	Machine pistol	Soviet Union	
Submachine guns
Sa 23		7.62×25mm	Submachine gun	Czechoslovakia	
Sterling		9×19mm	Submachine gun	United Kingdom	
Rifles
Vz. 52		7.62×45mm	Semi-automatic rifle	Czechoslovakia	
SKS		7.62×39mm	Semi-automatic rifle	Soviet Union	
AK		7.62×39mm	Assault rifle	Soviet Union	
AKM		7.62×39mm	Assault rifle	Soviet Union	
Type 56		7.62x39mm	Assault rifle	China	
AMD-65		7.62×39mm	Assault rifle	Hungary	
Vz. 58		7.62×39mm	Assault rifle	Czechoslovakia	
IMI Galil MAR		5.56×45mm	Assault rifle	Israel	
Heckler & Koch HK33A2		5.56×45mm	Assault rifle	Germany	
Heckler & Koch G3		7.62×51mm	Battle rifle	Germany	
FN FAL		7.62×51mm	Battle rifle	Belgium	
Lee-Enfield		.303 British	Bolt-action	United Kingdom	
Machine guns
SG-43		7.62×54mmR	Medium machine gun	Soviet Union	
IWI Negev		5.56×45mm	Light machine gun	Israel	
RP-46		7.62×54mmR	Light machine gun	Soviet Union	
RPD		7.62×39mm	Light machine gun	Soviet Union	
RPK		7.62×39mm	Squad automatic weapon	Soviet Union	
UK vz. 59		7.62×54mmR	General-purpose machine gun	Czechoslovakia	
Type 67		7.62×54mmR	General-purpose machine gun	China	
KPV		14.5×114mm	Heavy machine gun	Soviet Union	
DShK		12.7×108mm	Heavy machine gun	Soviet Union	
Rocket propelled grenade launchers
RPG-7		40mm	Rocket-propelled grenade	Soviet Union	
Grenade launchers
QLZ-87		35×32mm	Automatic grenade launcher	China	

== Anti-tank weapons ==
Name	Image	Type	Origin	Caliber	Notes
Type 52		Recoilless rifle	United States; China	75mm	
M18		Recoilless rifle	United States	57mm	

== Vehicles ==
=== Tanks ===
Name	Image	Type	Origin	Quantity	Notes
VT-2		Main Battle Tank	China	5	Delivered by China from 2021
Type 59G		Main Battle Tank	China; Bangladesh	15	Delivered by China from 1971–1973; all rebuilt as Type 59Gs from 2011–2013 according to SIPRI
T-54		Medium tank	Soviet Union	32	Delivered by East Germany from 1979–1980
Type 62		Light tank	China	66	Delivered by China from 1970–1972
Type 63		Light tank	China	18	Delivered by China from 1977–1979
Type 63A		Light tank	China	24	Delivered by China from 2012–2013
FV101 Scorpion		Light tank	United Kingdom	40	Delivered by United Kingdom in 1973

=== Infantry fighting vehicles ===
Name	Image	Type	Origin	Quantity	Notes
Type 07P		Infantry fighting vehicle	China	12	

=== Scout cars ===
Name	Image	Type	Origin	Quantity	Notes
BRDM-2		Scout car	Soviet Union	10	Delivered by Soviet Union from 1978-1979

=== Armored personnel carriers ===
Name	Image	Type	Origin	Quantity	Notes
BTR-152		Armored personnel carrier	Soviet Union; China	55	Delivered by Soviet Union and China from 1966-1979
Type 55		Armored personnel carrier	Soviet Union; China	10	
WZ-551		Armored personnel carrier	China	10	Delivered by China from 2011-2012

=== Mine-resistant ambush protected vehicles ===
Name	Image	Type	Origin	Quantity	Notes
Casspir		MRAP	South Africa	5	Delivered in 2009

=== Utility vehicles ===
Name	Image	Type	Origin	Quantity	Notes
HMMWV		LUV	United States	Unknown	Vehicles sold via the U.S. Foreign Military Sales program
Ashok Leyland FAT		Heavy truck	India	Unknown	

== Artillery ==
Name	Image	Type	Origin	Quantity	Notes
Rocket artillery
BM-21 Grad		Multiple rocket launcher	Soviet Union	58	
A-100		Multiple rocket launcher	China	12	Delivered by China in 2013
Mortar carriers
PLL-05		Mortar carrier	China	10	Delivered in 2014
Mortars
Type 53		Infantry mortar	Soviet Union; China	Unknown	
Type 55		Mortar	Soviet Union; China	Unknown	
Field artillery
Type 54-1		Howitzer	Soviet Union; China	80	
Type 56		Field gun	Soviet Union; China	75	
Type 59-I		Field gun	Soviet Union; China	30	
D-30		Howitzer	Soviet Union	20	

== Air defence systems ==
=== Man-portable air-defense systems ===
Name	Image	Type	Origin	Quantity	Notes
9K32 Strela-2		MANPADS	Soviet Union	Unknown	

=== Towed anti-aircraft guns ===
Name	Image	Type	Origin	Quantity	Notes
ZPU		Anti-aircraft gun	Soviet Union	21	
ZU-23-2		Autocannon	Soviet Union	40	
61-K		Autocannon	Soviet Union	120	
