= WZ-523 =

WZ-523 M1984
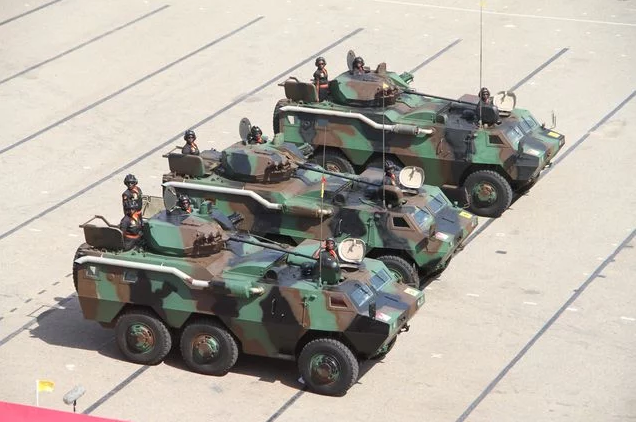
- WZ-523s of the Ghana Army
- Type: Armored personnel carrier
- Place of origin: People's Republic of China

Service history
- In service: 1984–present
- Used by: See Operators

Specifications
- Mass: 11,700 kg (25,800 lb)
- Length: 6.02 m (19 ft 9 in)
- Width: 2.55 m (8 ft 4 in)
- Height: 2.73 m (8 ft 11 in) (including machine gun)
- Crew: 2 + 10 passengers
- Armor: welded steel 20 mm front 14 mm sides 6 mm rear
- Main armament: 12.7 mm heavy machine gun
- Engine: Water-cooled petrol engine 123 kilowatts (165 hp)
- Suspension: Wheeled 6x6
- Operational range: 600 km (370 mi)
- Maximum speed: 85 km/h (53 mph) (road speed); 7 km/h (4.3 mph) (water speed)

The WZ-523 (NATO reporting name M1984) is a six-wheeled Chinese armored personnel carrier designed to be amphibious. Built on the chassis of the Hanyang HY472 truck, it can carry a crew of three and seat up to eight additional passengers. Two primary models were produced—one with a roof-mounted 12.7mm heavy machine gun, and the other with a small turret armed with a 35mm grenade launcher and a 7.62mm co-axial general purpose machine gun. An export model that entered service in 2008 as a fire support vehicle was also marketed successfully to the Namibian Army; this is armed with a 73mm 2A28 Grom smoothbore cannon using the same turret as the Soviet BMP-1 infantry fighting vehicle.

The WZ-523 was unveiled at a military parade in Beijing in October 1984, gaining the NATO designation M1984, although it was destined for export and did not enter large scale service with the People's Liberation Army (PLA). An internal security vehicle based on the WZ-523, the ZFB-91, which has a turret armed with a 35 mm grenade launcher and a 7.62 mm machine gun replacing the roof mounted 12.7 mm anti-aircraft machine gun of the WZ-523, is in service with PLA units in Hong Kong and Macau.

== Development and history ==
The WZ-523 is based on the domestic Dongfeng EQ245 truck platform, with a new chassis. It was developed in parallel with the competing project WZ-551. Due to utilizing old technologies, WZ-523 was developed much faster with initial production starting in 1983. It first appeared on the 35th National Day parade in 1984. However, it WZ-523 chassis eventually lost its bid due to having worse performance than WZ-551. WZ-523 project was then refocused for export effort and did not enter large scale service with the People's Liberation Army (PLA).

When the WZ-523 was first exhibited publicly, there were many observations by international defence analysts regarding its design origins. Although the hull design resembled that of the South African Sandock-Austral Ratel infantry fighting vehicle, subsequent studies have found that while there may have been some South African influence, the WZ-523 has many unique characteristics in overall dimensions and technical features. For example, its driving compartment is somewhat reminiscent of the BTR-60, with a single passenger seated next to the driver. The location of the turret ring is also similar that of the BTR-60 series rather than the Ratel, being located near the hull center.

The People's Liberation Army has deployed the WZ-523 primarily for reconnaissance purposes, and for specialized tasks involving artillery and combat support units. Despite being designed as an armored personnel carrier, it was not adopted by Chinese mechanized or motorized infantry forces.

Outside of China, Sudan's Military Industry Corporation also produces the WZ-523 under license.

== Specifications ==
WZ-523s have relatively good range and payload, and may seat up to ten passengers who enter and debus from a single door in the rear hull. The vehicle has a long, boat-shaped hull with a trim vane mounted on the glacis plate. It is fully amphibious once this vane is raised, being propelled at speeds of up to 7 km by two water jets at the rear. A two-piece windscreen is provided for the driver and a passenger seated to his right. During combat, the windscreen may be covered by hinged armored shutters.

Export models of the WZ-523 are offered with a variety of turreted armament options, including a 12.7mm machine gun and a one-man conical turret incorporating a single 7.62mm general-purpose machine gun to the right and a heavier armament of the customer's choice to the left.

WZ-523s in Nigerien and Gabonese service have been re-engined with German Deutz BF6 diesel motors.

== Variants ==
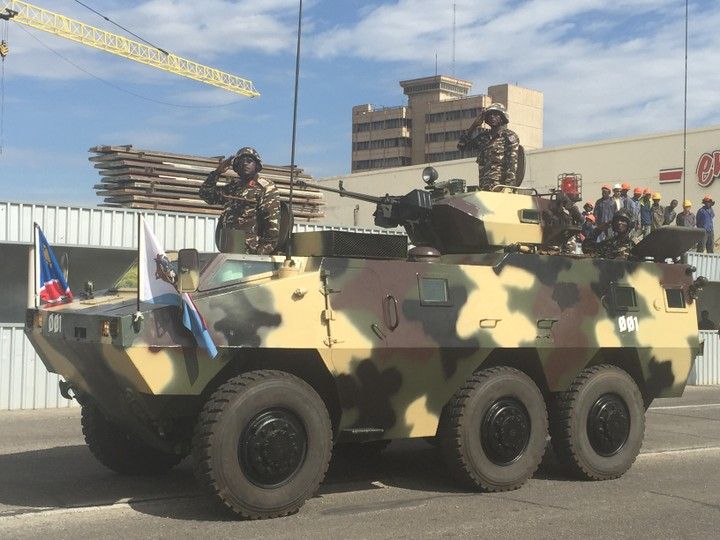
WZ-523 Type 05P3 in Namibian service.

WZ-523
Armored Personnel Carrier armed with a 12.7 mm heavy machine gun.
ZFB-91
Internal Security Vehicle based on the WZ-523.

== Operators ==
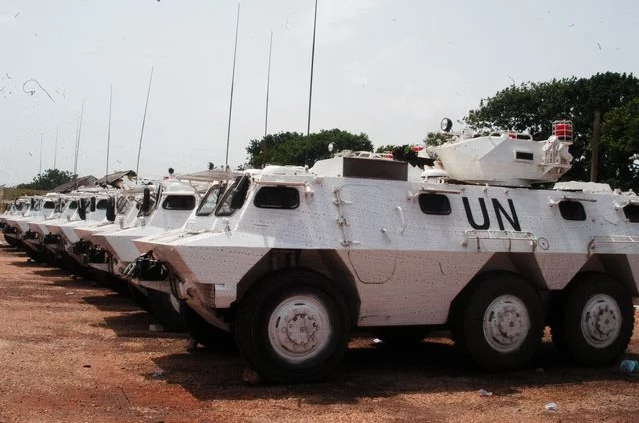
WZ-523s in UN peacekeeping colors.

- China: 60 in service, not including ZFB91 variant.
- Chad: 10
- Ethiopia: 20
- Gabon: 3
- Ghana: 58 delivered in 2009–2010; 4 ambulance version delivered in 2012 and 24 others in 2013.
- Namibia: 21; export model incorporating the BMP-1 turret.
- Niger: 2
- Sudan: produced under license as the Shareef 2.

== See also ==
=== Vehicles of comparable role, performance, and era ===
- WZ551 – (China)
- Ratel – (South Africa)
- EE-11 Urutu – (Brazil)
- SIBMAS – (Belgium)
- Pindad Anoa – (Indonesia)
- Berliet VXB-170 – (France)
