= Type 86 (infantry fighting vehicle) =

Type 86 IFV
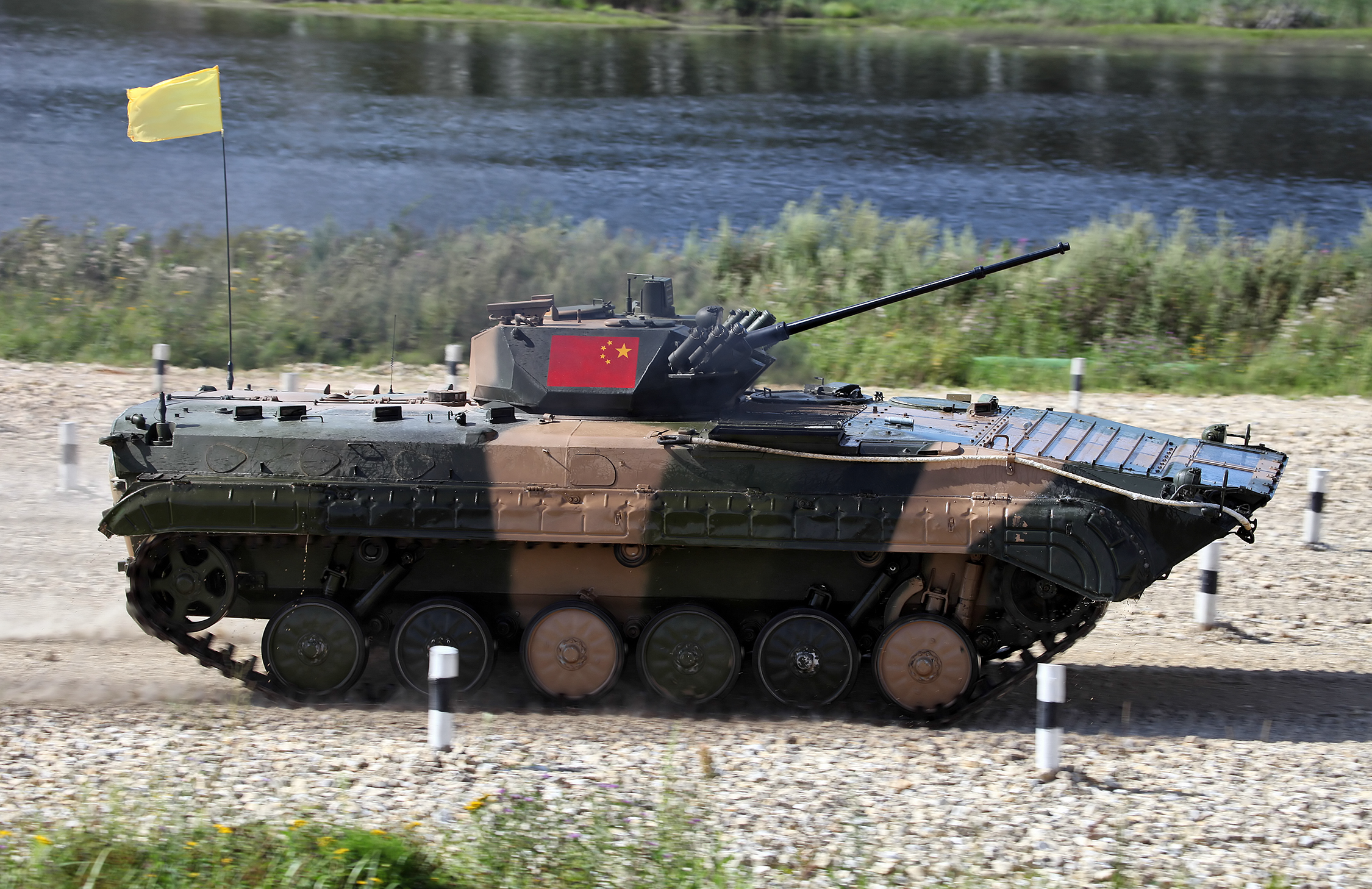
- ZBD-86A at Tank Biathlon 2016
- Type: Infantry fighting vehicle
- Place of origin: China

Service history
- In service: 1992–present

Production history
- No. built: 3000 (estimate)

Specifications
- Mass: 13.3 t (14.7 short tons; 13.1 long tons)
- Length: 6.74 m (22 ft 1 in)
- Width: 2.97 m (9 ft 9 in)
- Height: 2.16 m (7 ft 1 in)
- Crew: 3
- Passengers: 8
- Armor: Welded steel
- Main armament: Type 86: 73 mm gun Type 86G: 30 mm autocannon
- Secondary armament: 7.62 mm coaxial machine gun HJ-73 anti-tank missiles
- Engine: diesel 298 hp
- Suspension: Torsion bar
- Operational range: 500 km (310 mi)
- Maximum speed: 65 km/h (40 mph) (road); 8 km/h (5.0 mph; 4.3 kn) (water)

The Type 86, also known as WZ501, is a Chinese variant of the Soviet BMP-1 (Type 86G) infantry fighting vehicle (IFV).

== Development ==
When the BMP-1, one of the most influential infantry fighting vehicle designs, was fielded by the Soviet Army in early 1970s, China was in the turmoil of the Cultural Revolution. China did not begin any development of infantry fighting vehicles during the 1970s, and kept using armored personnel carriers of earlier designs. After the Cultural Revolution ended in 1976, the following Sino–Vietnamese War in 1979 revealed the urgent need for a stronger armored fighting vehicle design.

The Vietnamese army often harassed the People's Liberation Army (PLA) in the form of small units, attacking the front and rear vehicles of an armored convoy in narrow mountainous areas to trap Chinese forces. Most PLA infantrymen who accompanied tanks were either on foot, in thinly armored vehicles, or riding on the tank roof, thus sustaining heavy casualties. The Chinese realized that the armed force required new armored supporting vehicles to protect its mechanized infantry in battle. These field reports directly prompted China’s effort to field new infantry fighting vehicles.

In the 1970s and 1980s, through providing maintenance service for the Egyptian Army, the state-owned defense manufacturer Norinco acquired the export variant of BMP-1 infantry fighting vehicle from Egypt in 1980, which was then reverse-engineered. The prototype was codenamed "WZ-501" and launched for testing in 1984. In 1986, the WZ-501 design was finalized, and it received the designation Type 86 tracked infantry fighting vehicle. The Type 86 was primarily made for export, and large numbers of vehicles were delivered to foreign users. The vehicle went into People's Liberation Army service in 1992, becoming the first type of infantry fighting vehicle formally adopted by the PLA. The first batch was delivered to the 38th Group Army in 1993. A total of about 1,000 vehicles were equipped, concentrated in the mechanized units of the Group Armies in the northern part of mainland China.

Type 86 was modernized in the 1990s and early 2000s, resulting in Type 86-I and ZBD-86A. Several hundred Type 86 IFVs were converted into the ZBD-86A standard. Both variants are fitted with autocannons, making them function broadly similar to the BMP-2. As of 2020, 2250 units of ZBD-86 and ZBD-86A are in the People's Liberation Army Ground Force service.

== Variants ==
=== Type 86 ===
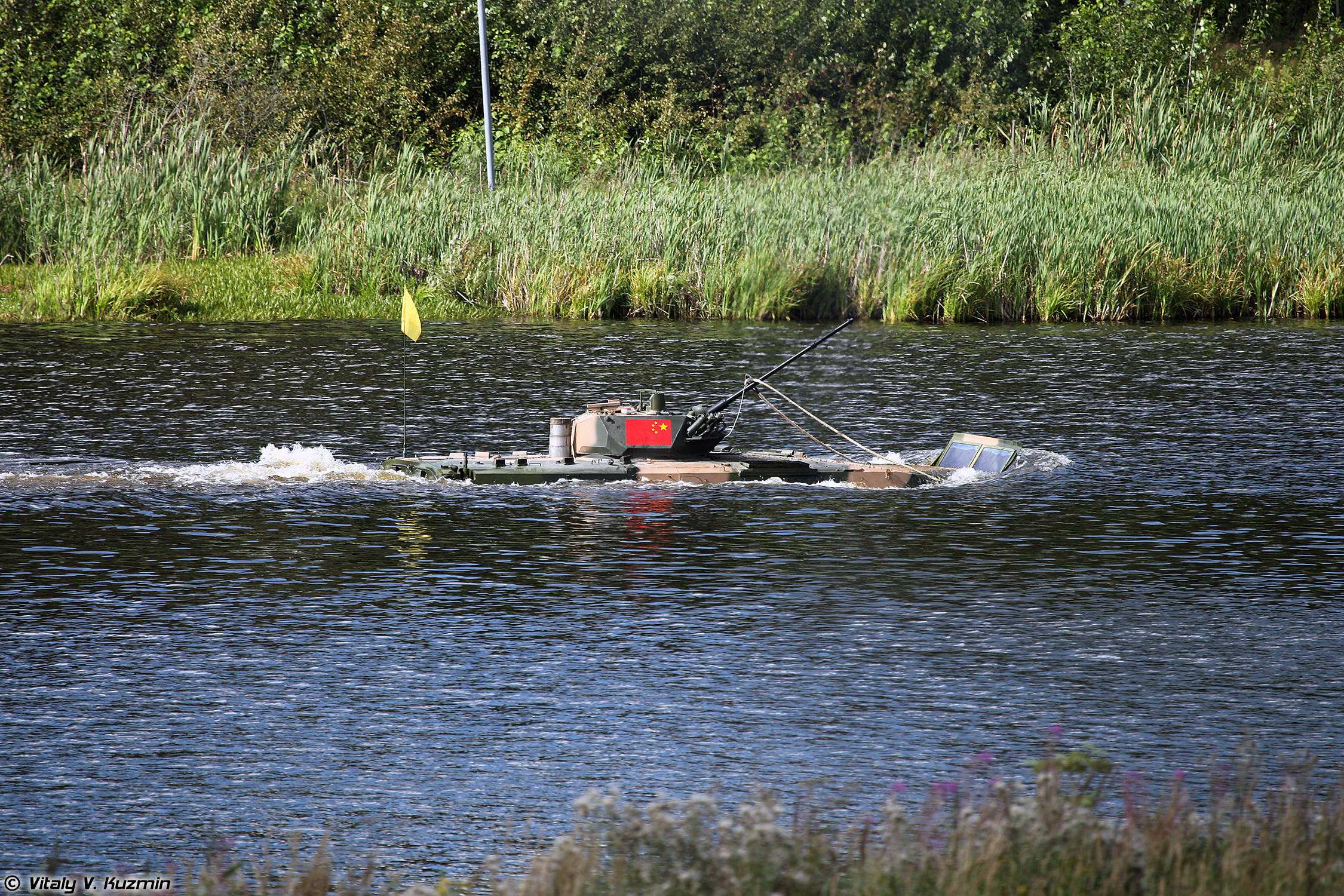
A Type 86A infantry fighting vehicle traversing in water

- Type 86 – A Chinese copy of the BMP-1 (Ob'yekt 765Sp3). It is armed with an ATGM launcher for the HJ-73 "Red Arrow 73" ATGM, which is a copy of the Soviet 9M14 "Malyutka". It is powered by the Type 6V150 diesel engine which is a copy of the Soviet UTD-20. Equipment includes the A-220A radio (a copy of the Soviet R-123M), A-221A intercom (a copy of the Soviet R-124), two 7.62 mm machine guns, a 40 mm rocket propelled grenade (RPG) launcher, and an HN-5 or QW-1 MANPADS. Its industrial designation is WZ-501.
  - WZ-501 – Converted into an NBC reconnaissance vehicle with a raised troop compartment.
  - WZ-501 – Converted into a battlefield surveillance vehicle.
  - YW-501 – Export variant of WZ-501.
  - NFV-1 (N stands for NORINCO, F stands for FMC and V-1 stands for Vehicle 1) – An export variant which was the product of a co-operative project between the Chinese NORINCO and US FMC companies in the 1980s. Its goal was to fit an FMC large vertical slab-sided turret with a chamfered front called "Sharpshooter", onto a modified Type 86 hull. It was to be armed with a 25 mm M242 Bushmaster autocannon with a two plane stabilization system and a 7.62 mm M240 coaxial machine gun (on the left-hand side of the main gun). The vehicle carries 344 rounds for the main gun, 200 rounds are for 'ready use' while 144 are kept in storage. 2,300 rounds are carried for the machine gun. The gun is moved in the horizontal and vertical planes by an electromechanical system; it can also be moved manually. The gun can be depressed or elevated between −7° and +44°. The gunner has the М36Е3 dual-mode day/night sight and 4 periscope vision blocks, which are located in the front and on the sides of the turret. Also, an additional periscope vision block can be fitted to the back of the turret. The tracks have been slightly modified. As a result of all these changes, the weight of the vehicle increased to 13.6 tonnes, and the maximum range was reduced to 460 km. The vehicle is also wider (2.97 m) and higher (2,248 m). The prototype was shown to the public for the first time in November 1986. It never left the prototype stage because the US government prohibited any further collaboration with China.

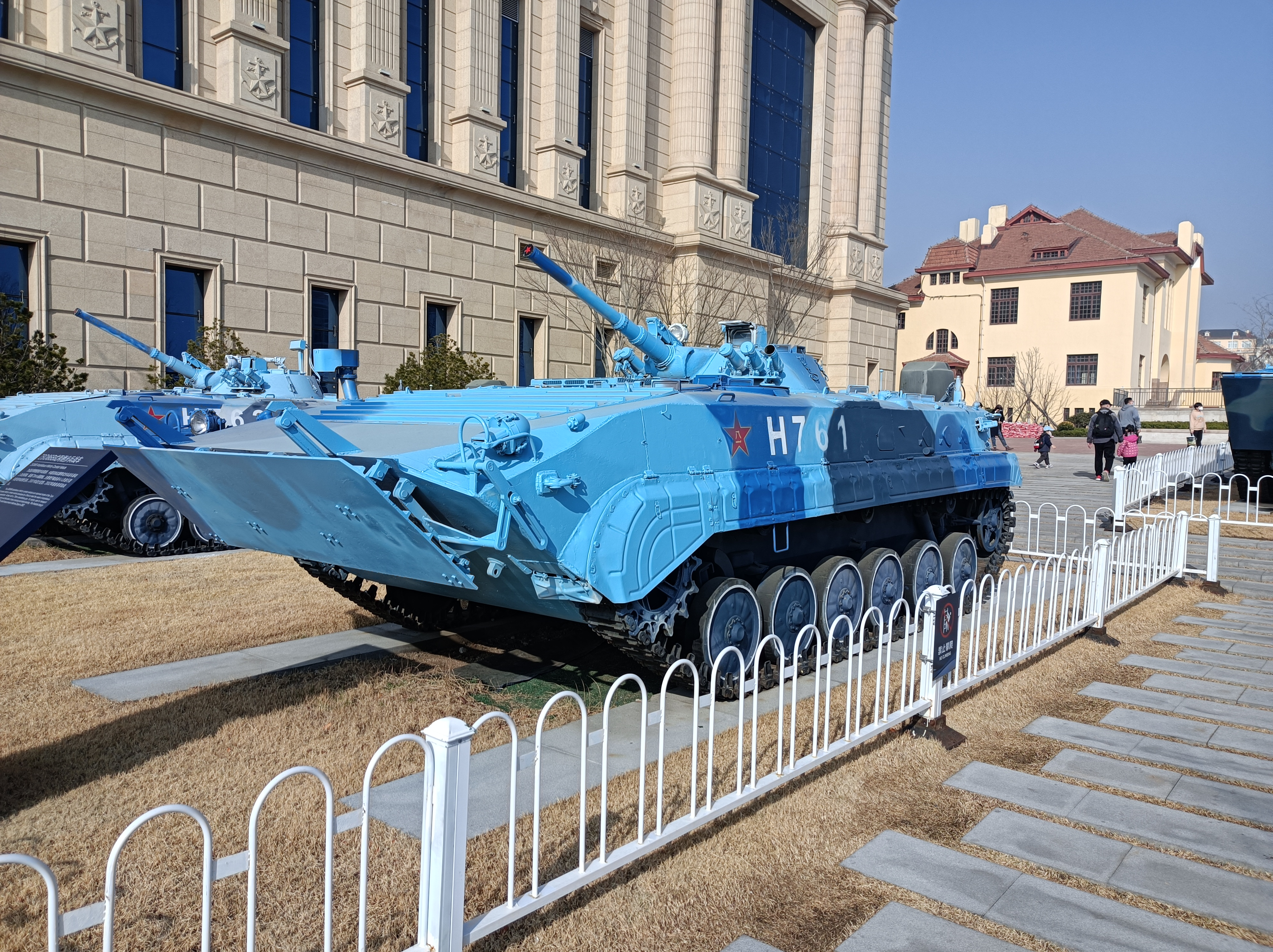
PLA Navy ZBD-86B with the extended bow and trim vane

  - Type 86B – Variant developed by NORINCO for Chinese naval infantry. It features a slightly higher hull, an amphibious kit, an exhaust extension, a bow extension, a larger trim vane, a mount for an outboard motor on the rear of the hull to improve its swimming performance, a raised engine air intake on the right hand side of the front of the hull, detachable pontoons in the front and rear of the hull, a high snorkel and large side screens for better streamlining. Also, the turret was improved by adding two clusters of three smoke grenade launchers (one on each side of the turret). Its industrial designation is WZ-501C.
  - WZ-502 – WZ-501 equipped with a mortar.
  - WZ-503 – WZ-501 converted into an APC. It lacks the turret and has a taller troop compartment. The number of passengers was increased from 8 to 13. The vehicle's armament consists of one centrally mounted 12.7 mm heavy machine gun operated by the commander/gunner. It did not leave the prototype stage.
    - WZ-506 – WZ-503 converted into an armored command post for the divisional or regimental commanders of armored formations. The personnel compartment can accommodate six staff members, four radios and an auxiliary electricity generator. It can be recognized by its four whip antennas.
  - WZ-504 (Type 504) – The troop compartment was replaced by a weapons compartment which incorporates an elevatable weapon station armed with four HJ-73 "Red Arrow 73" cable-guided ATGM rail launchers mounted under the roof of the weapons station and equipped with optical sights. The launcher can be retracted into the compartment when not in use. The vehicle carries 16 ATGMs. It never left the prototype stage.
  - WZ-501 armored ambulance – regular WZ-501 converted into an armored ambulance with raised troop compartment and armed with one machine gun.

=== Modernized variants ===
- Type 86-I or WZ-505– Improved variant of the Type 86 armed with ZPT-90 25 mm autocannon and a coaxial 7.62 mm Type 59 machine gun. The overhead mount turret is the same as the one on the ZSL92 wheeled IFV. The vehicle carries 400 rounds for the main gun and 2000 rounds for the machine gun. It is powered by a new 6V150F 29.41-litre diesel engine, which is a powered-up version of the 6V150. It develops 400 hp (298 kW). Maximum road speed has increased to 70 km/h. The tracks have been slightly modified. The weight of the vehicle has increased to 13.6 tonnes. 350 were produced. Its industrial designation is WZ-501A or WZ-505. It is also called Type 86-1.
- Type 86A (ZBD-86A) – Modernization fitted with a new turret armed with a fully stabilized ZPT-99 30 mm autocannon, a Type 86 coaxial machine gun and a missile launch rail for the SACLOS HJ-73C ATGMs positioned on the right hand side of the roof of the turret. The vehicle is fitted with a modernized electronics system, including thermal imaging sight, laser rangefinder, angle measurement sensor, and digital ballistic computer. The turret was equipped with two clusters of three smoke grenade launchers (one on each side of the turret). The turret design is broadly similar to that of ZSL92B and ZLC2000 prototypes (ZBD-03). It is sometimes called the Type 86Gai, G stands for Gai – improved. The ZBD-86A went into service in 2000. Overall, it is broadly equivalent to a BMP-2.

=== Others ===
- Boragh

== Gallery ==
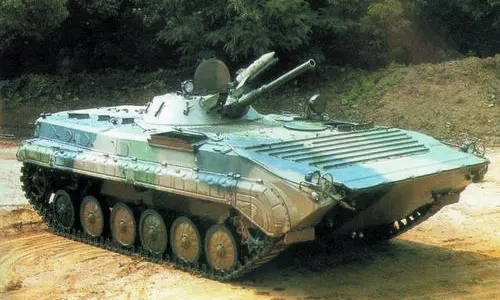
Early variant of the Type 86

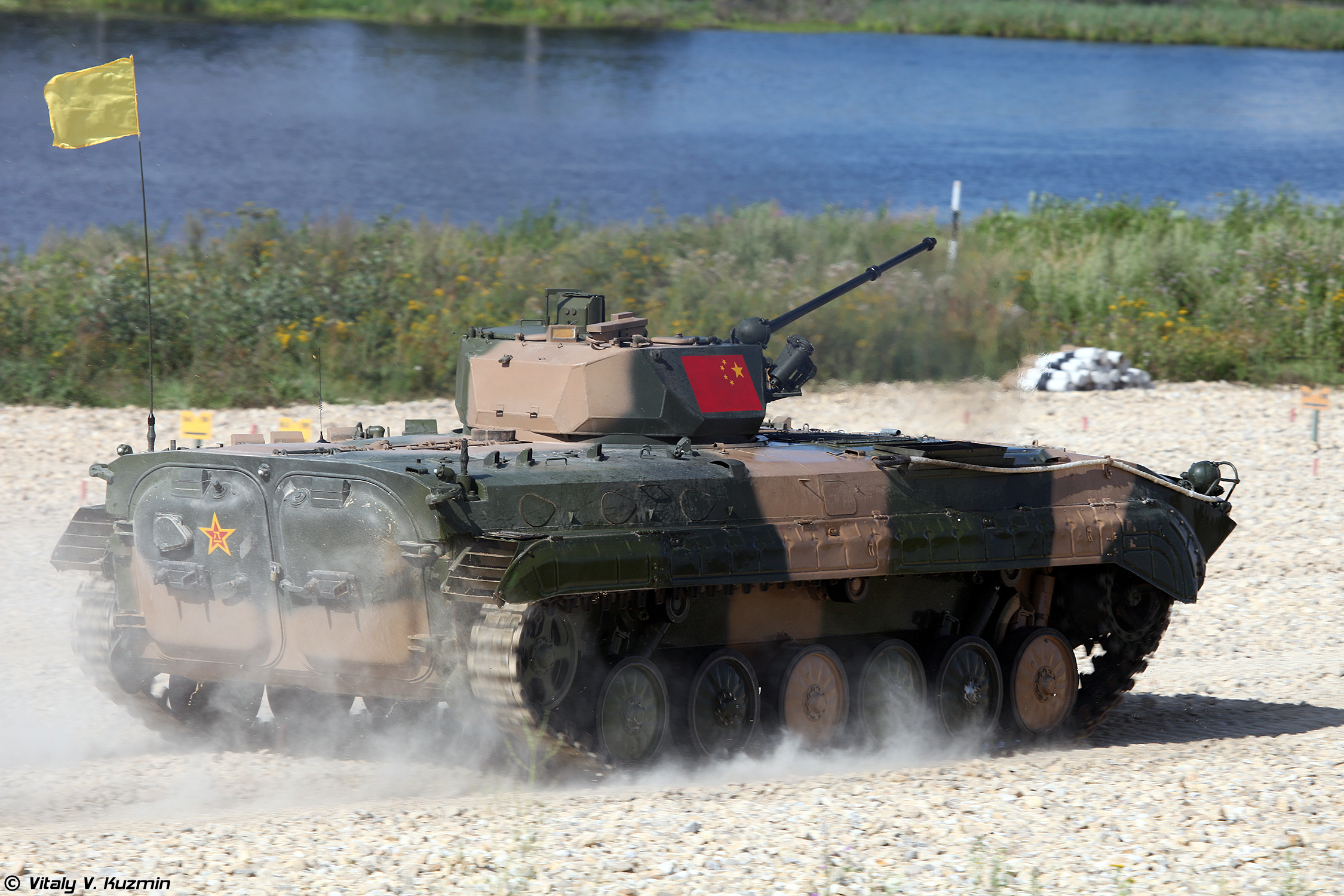
Troop compartment of the Type 86A

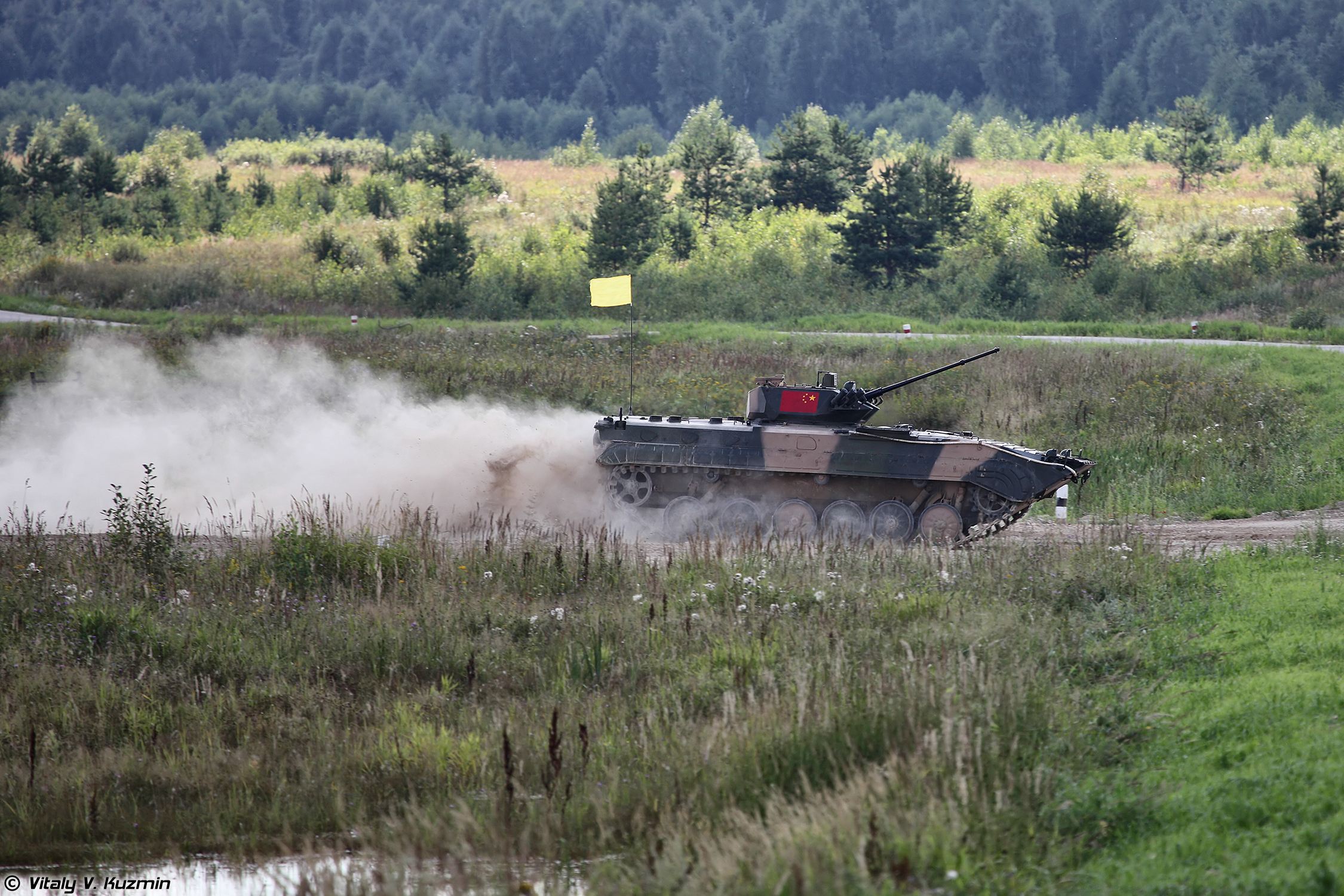
ZBD-86A at Tank Biathlon 2016

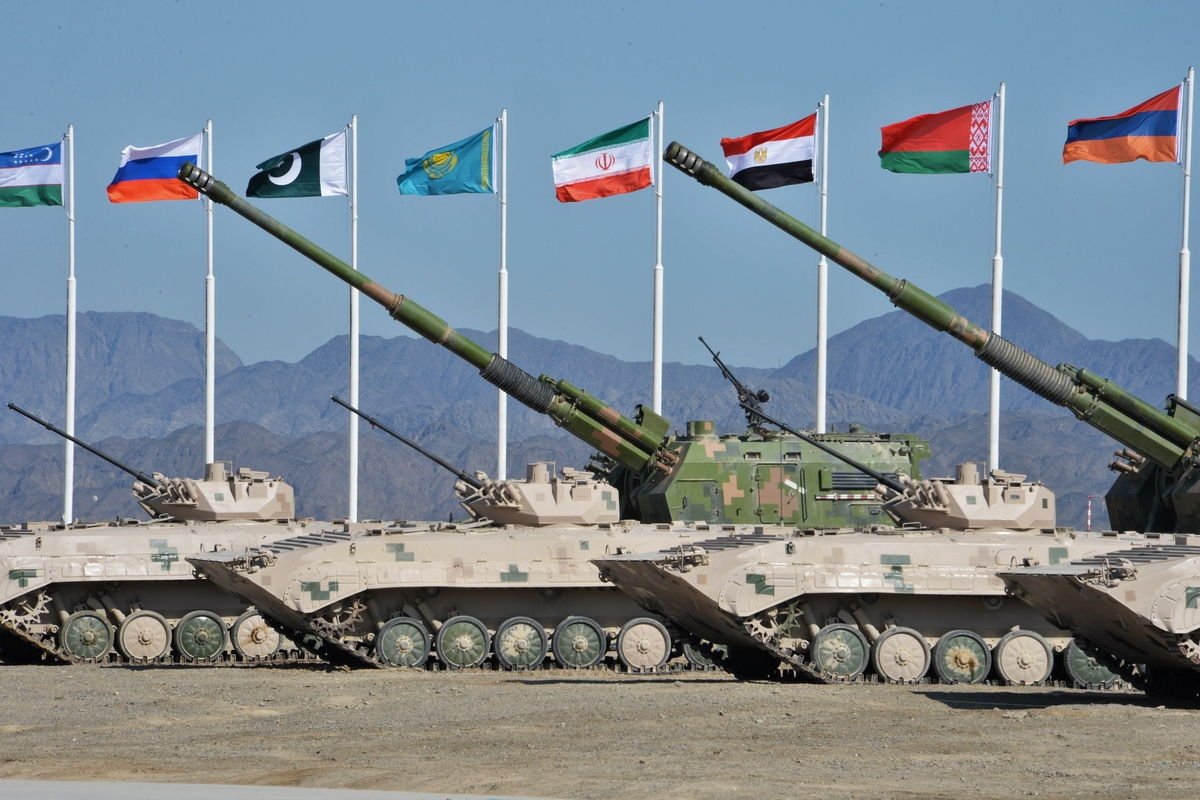
ZBD-86A at Army Games 2019

== Operators ==
China
People's Liberation Army Ground Force - 1,250 units of ZBD-86A; 1,000 units of ZBD-86 in storeage as of 2026.
Myanmar
Sri Lanka
Iran
Iraq

== See also ==
- ZBD-97 – (China)
- BMP-1 – (Soviet Union)
- BMP-2 – (Soviet Union)
- BMP development
- MLI-84 – (Socialist Republic of Romania) – IFV based on a modified BMP chassis
- BMP-23 – (Bulgaria)
- Dardo IFV – (Italy)
- Marder (IFV) – (West Germany)
- Lazika – (Georgia)
- M2 Bradley – (United States)
- Combat Vehicle 90 – (Sweden)
- ASCOD – (Spain, Austria)
- Warrior IFV – (United Kingdom)
- BVP M80 IFV – (Yugoslavia)
- XCB-01 – (Vietnam) - (Vietnam)
