= Military Industry Corporation =

Defense corporation of Sudan

- Native name: هيئة التصنيع الحربي
- Company type: State-owned company
- Industry: Defence
- Founded: 1993; 33 years ago
- Headquarters: Khartoum, Khartoum, Sudan
- Area served: Africa
- Key people: Mirghani Idris (President)
- Products: munitions, firearms, artillery, combat vehicle, naval vessels, civil and military aerospace, electro-optical devices, telecommunications
- Subsidiaries: Alshagara Industrial Complex; Yarmouk Industrial Complex; Elshaheed Ibrahim Shamseldeen Complex for Heavy Industries; Alzargaa Engineering Complex; Safat Aviation Complex
- Website: www.mic.sd

The Military Industry Corporation is the state-run defense corporation of Sudan. It is responsible for the production of a wide range of defence equipment, such as munitions, firearms, artillery etc.

== History ==
The MIC was established by national decree in 1993 under the Ministry of Defence and consolidate the existing defense establishment and manufacturing plants.

MIC has made efforts to push more sales in Africa since 2013 when MIC’s director of external relations, Ali Othman Mahmoud said that local production is being encouraged to meet the needs of the Sudanese military and export any surplus materials abroad.

== Organisation ==
The MIC is grouped into the following major complexes covering different areas:

- Alshagara Industrial Complex (AIC)

Established in 1959 as the El Sharja Ammunition Plant, it was absorbed into MIC during its formation. AIC is responsible for manufacturing a wide range of small arms ammunition.

- Yarmouk Industrial Complex (YIC)

Established in 1993 and inaugurated in 1996, YIC appears to be responsible for the processing and manufacturing of dual use products that cover the construction, transport and manufacturing industries in Khartoum's Soba section. It's managed by the National Intelligence and Security Service and has a 35% ownership by Iran. Iranian Revolutionary Guard Corp personnel were reported to be working there. In 2012, it was suggested that the Israeli Air Force conducted an air strike on YIC.

- Elshaheed Ibrahim Shamseldeen Complex for Heavy Industries

Established in 2002 in Giad, the complex is responsible for the manufacturing and maintenance of armored vehicles as well as industrial heavy vehicles.

- Alzargaa Engineering Complex

Established in 1999 and inaugurated in 2004 in Halfya, Khartoum, the Alzargaa Engineering Complex is responsible for various electronics and electro-optic equipment for the Sudan military. It is also involved in the Sudanese telecommunications market through Sudatel.

- Safat Aviation Complex (SAC)

Established in 2005, SAC is responsible for supporting the Sudanese Air Force in the maintenance of its military aviation capabilities. Africa Confidential reports that UAVs made in SAC were done with Iranian assistance.

== Productions ==
The MIC have advertised a wide range of products that appears to be versions of equipment originally supplied to Sudan or licensed by China, Russia and Iran. Armored vehicles are repaired and produced at the Elshaheed Ibrahim Shams el Deen Complex in Khartoum.

=== Small arms ===
==== Pistols ====
- Marra

A CZ-75 clone built with Chinese machinery, originally designed and built in the Czech Republic.

- Lado (CZ-75 Compact)

A clone built from Chinese machinery; in .32 ACP caliber, originally designed and built in Czech Republic.

==== Assault rifles ====
- Dinar G3

Local licensed copy of the G3 rifle designed in Germany, it is assembled with Iranian machine tools.

- Maz (MAZ)

Chinese AKM. Built with Chinese machinery. It is marketed as a submachine gun.

- Terab

Chinese AR-15 clone, built with machinery bought from China. It was marked as being chambered in 7.62 NATO ammo. The correction was made that MIC documentation mentions that it chambers 5.56 NATO ammo in recent years.

- Sinan

Based on the QBZ-97/Type 97, it is chambered in 5.56 NATO ammo and seemingly made from Chinese components shipped to Khartoum.

==== Sub-machine guns ====
- Tihraga

Designed in Germany, it is made from Iranian machinery.

==== Machine-guns ====
- Mokhtar

A Type 80 machine gun built from machinery bought in China.

- Khawad

A Type 85 heavy machine gun built from machinery bought in China.

- Karar

A MG3 machine gun designed in Germany, also built from machinery bought in Iran.

==== Grenade launcher ====
- Ahmad/Abba
- A grenade launcher based on the QLZ-87 as Abba or Ahmad.

==== Light antitank weapons ====
- Sinar

A widely used antitank weapon, manufactured under from Bulgaria's ATGL-type RPGs, although the pistol grips were based on Iranian-made RPGs. A variant of it, the Sinar RPG-7V, is based on Iranian commando-type RPGs.

==== Heavy antitank weapons ====
- Sarib

A licensed version of the HJ-8.

==== MANPADS ====
- Nayzak

Made from the FN-6.

=== Armoured vehicles ===
==== Jeeps ====
- Karaba VTG01

Licensed version of the Safir.

==== MBT ====
- Digna MBT

Unlicensed copy from Russia/China.

- Al Basheer MBT (Type 85M-II)

Unlicensed copy from China.

- Al Zubair 1 MBT

Unlicensed copy from Iran.

- Al Zubair 2 MBT

Unlicensed copy from China, similar to Type 59D.

- SarSar-1
- SarSar-2

An armoured reconnaissance vehicle based on a South Korean KIA truck chassis made under licence.

- Tamal

A technical based on the Ruiqi pickup trucks made under Zhengzhou Nissan.

- Nimr LRPV:

An armoured patrol vehicle based on a Dongfeng-made vehicle.

==== Howitzer ====
- Abu Fatma SPG

Unlicensed copy from Bulgaria or Iran.

==== IFV ====
- Shareef 1 IFV

Unlicensed copy, originally produced in Russia; derived from the BTR-80A IFV.

- Shareef 2 IFV

Unlicensed copy, originally produced in China; derived from the WZ551 IFV.

- Shareef 3 IFV

An upgrade to the BTR-70 by changing original two ZMZ-4905 engines with a more fuel-efficient KAMAZ-7403 V8 water-cooled diesel developing 260hp at 2,600 rpm with the installation of a BMP-1 IFV turret.

- Amir IFV

Unlicensed copy, originally produced in Iran; derived from the Rakhsh IFV.

- Amir 2 IFV

Clone of the BRDM-2. Its engine is changed from a GAZ-41 V8 petrol engine developing 140 hp to an Isuzu 6HH-1 6-cylinder diesel developing 210 hp.

- Khatim 1 IFV

Unlicensed copy, originally produced in Iran, derived from the Boragh IFV.

- Khatim 2

Variant of Khatim 1, houses a mortar.

- Khatim 4

Variant of Khatim 1. It debuted at the IDEX 2017 convention.

=== Artillery ===
- Nijoumi

Unlicensed copy, originally produced in Russia; derived from the BS-3.

- Khalifa

Unlicensed copy, originally produced in Russia; derived from the D-30M. It's mounted on a Kamaz truck.

- Mahdi

Unlicensed copy, originally produced in Russia; derived from the M-30.

- Aboud

Unlicensed copy, originally produced in Russia; derived from the M-37M.

- Saba

Unlicensed copy, originally produced in Russia; derived from the SPG-9.

- Taka

Unlicensed copy, originally produced in China; derived from the Chinese MLRS Type 63. It's mounted on a South Korean KIA-made truck.

=== Others ===
- Ateed

An indigenous RCWS system, it debuted at the IDEX 2015 convention. It's licensed from the Iranian ARIO-H762 RCWS made by Rayan Roshd Afzar.
