= WZ-551 =

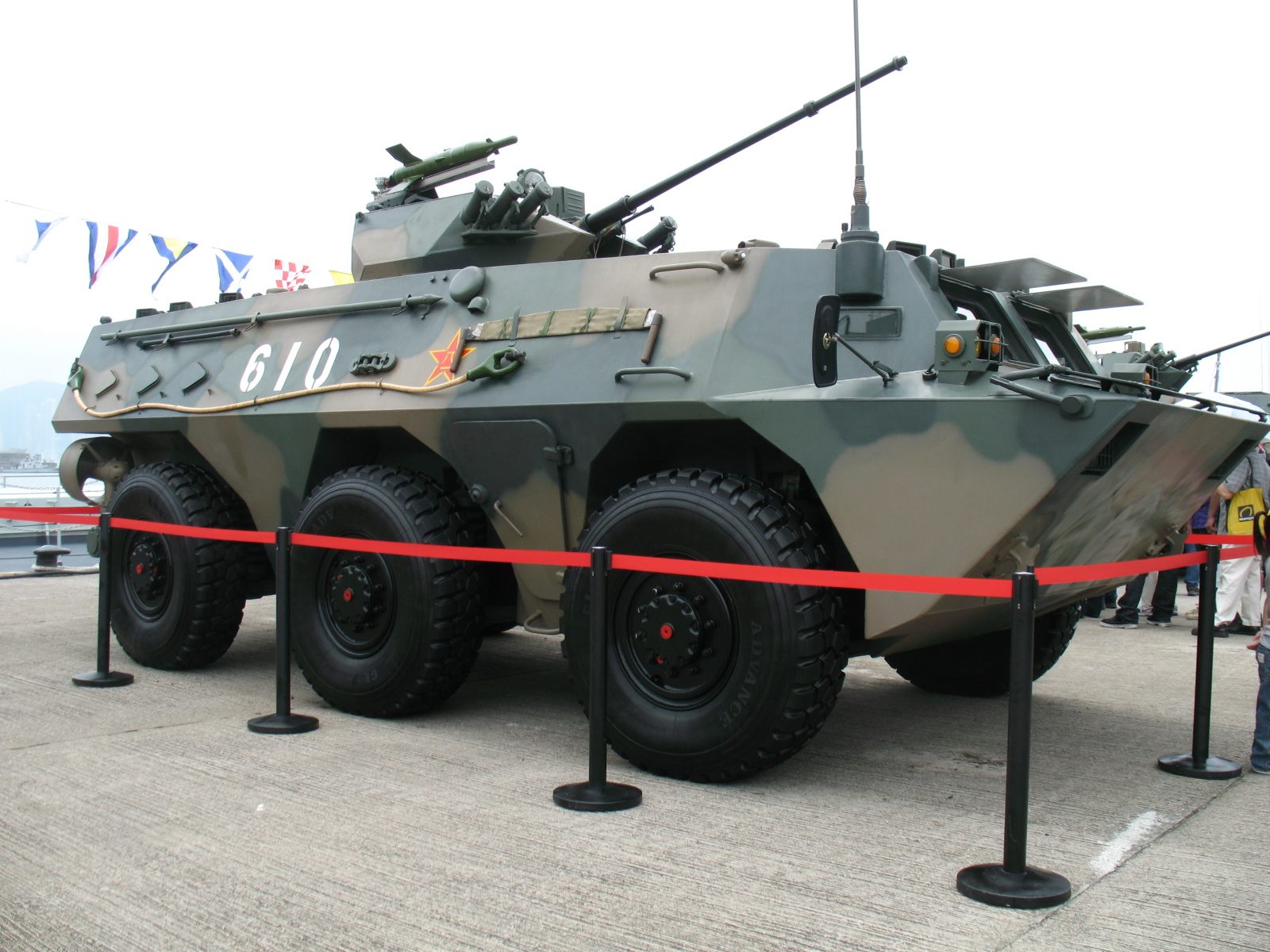
- A ZSL-92B AFV showcased in PLA Hong Kong base
- Type: Armoured fighting vehicle
- Place of origin: China

Service history
- In service: 1990–present
- Used by: See Operators
- Wars: Boko Haram insurgency Somali Civil War; ECOWAS military intervention in the Gambia; Al-Shabaab Insurgency in Cabo Delgado; Tigray War; Myanmar civil war (2021–present)

Production history
- Designer: Jiang Hong [WZ-551B] at NORINCO Vehicle Research Institute; institute 201 (中国北方车辆研究所 China Vehicles Research Institute) and Institute 202
- Manufacturer: Norinco, at Factory 256 (西南车辆制造厂Southwest Vehicles Factories)

Specifications
- Mass: 12.5 to 15.8 tonnes
- Length: 6.63 m
- Width: 2.80 m
- Height: 2.80 m
- Crew: 3 + 9 passengers
- Armor: Welded steel
- Main armament: ZPT-90 25 mm (ZSL-92); QJC-88 12.7 mm (ZSL-92A); ZPT-99 30 mm (ZSL-92B); PTP-86 100 mm (PTL-02)
- Secondary armament: Type 86 7.62mm coaxial machine gun
- Engine: BF8L413F 8-cylinder, turbo-charged, air-cooled diesel 320 hp
- Transmission: ZF 5S-lllGPA mechanical transmission
- Suspension: Independent wheel
- Operational range: 800 km
- Maximum speed: 85 km/h

The WZ-551 is a Chinese wheeled infantry fighting vehicle family. The name WZ-551 actually covers two families of vehicles with the official designations in the People's Liberation Army (PLA) – Type 90 and Type 92. Over 3,000 WZ-551s are in service with the PLA, where they are used by medium mechanized infantry units.

WZ-551s have been exported to Algeria, Bosnia, Sri Lanka, Nepal, Pakistan, and Senegal.

== History ==
=== Origins ===
The WZ-551 project began in 1979 and was the first wheeled infantry fighting vehicle developed by China. WZ-551 was developed with the experience gained from the development of the WZ-521 wheeled armored personnel carrier based on Jiefang CA-30 truck. In 1981, WZ-551 finished prototyping proof of concept designs, and the vehicle was an indigenous chassis based on the imported Mercedes-Benz 2060 truck. Production licenses for key technologies were acquired from Mercedes-Benz and Deutz AG. In 1982, multiple weapon configurations were proposed, including 35 mm autocannon, 30 mm autocannon, 25 mm autocannon, 12.7 mm heavy machine gun, or reverse-engineered 2A28 Grom from Type 86 infantry fighting vehicle. The final choice was to develop 25 mm autocannon for the IFV variant and 12.7 mm heavy machine gun for the APC variant.

Another project, WZ-523 based on the domestic Dongfeng EQ245 truck platform, was developed in parallel with WZ-551. Due to utilizing old technologies, WZ-523 was developed much faster with initial production, starting in 1983. It first appeared on the 35th National Day parade in 1984. However, it was discovered that WZ-523 chassis cannot meet the required performance standard. WZ-523 project was then refocused for export effort and did not enter large scale service with the People's Liberation Army (PLA).

=== Early prototypes ===
WZ-551 project pressed on and produced several prototype vehicles with different armaments. To save development time, technologies from other Chinese vehicles were ported into the WZ-551, such as the sighting system, ventilation system, overpressure NBC system from the Type 86 IFV, 25 mm autocannon from the ZSD-89-II infantry fighting vehicle, and electrical water discharge system from the Type 63 amphibious tank. In 1984, the cooling system and transmission system finished testing. In 1986, two more prototypes were sent to northern provinces and southern Hainan island for cold and hot-weather trials. Plans were also made for an extended 4×4 and 8×8 vehicle family. In 1986, WZ-551 was confirmed by Central Military Commission as the future PLA wheeled platform, beating the internal competitor WZ-523.

Aside from IFV and APC, Chinese engineers also attempted to mount the indigenously developed Type 86 100 smoothbore cannon to the WZ-551 chassis, resulted in the Type 87 (PTL-87) assault gun prototype in 1987. Type 87 was fitted with gun-launched anti-tank missile and sophisticated fire control system, aiming to defeat Soviet T-72 and T-80 tanks. However, budgetary constraint, insufficient industrial capacity, and lack of interest from the Chinese military shelved further development beyond the initial proof of concept works.

In 1988, a deal was made with French firm GIAT to incorporate a GIAT 25-mm autocannon as the primary weapon for WZ-551 and the work on the redesign of WZ-551 began in China even before the French gun was delivered. Due to the urgent need to meet the schedule, the GIAT 25-mm autocannon was airlifted to China, as opposed to delivery via cargo ships, the usual practice at the time. The French system has a night-vision system, stabilized gun, and advanced fire control system. The new vehicle was named NGV-1, with N for "Norinco", G for "GIAT" and V for "vehicle". However, further NGV-1 development was cancelled due to the imposed EU arms embargo in 1989.

In 1990, the WZ-551 was certified with the original 25 mm autocannon.

=== Type 90 and Type 92 ===
The finalized WZ-551 was certified with military designation ZSL-90 or Type 90 infantry fighting vehicle, which was fitted with ZPT-90 25 mm autocannon (similar to the turret of ZSD-89-II infantry fighting vehicle). Development continued, and the vehicle was planned as universal chassis for a variety of weaponry platforms, such as command vehicle, anti-tank missile carrier, self-propelled anti-air system, and armored ambulance. Despite being used as a common chassis for many different platforms, the total number of vehicles of all types entering Chinese service is small due to its engine problem, and with the exception of the basic APC version, no other versions of ZSL-90 is known to be successfully exported due to the same reason. It is estimated that less than 100 units of WZ-551 (Type 90) were produced.

The WZ-551 (Type 90) was developed into WZ-551A. WZ-551A replaced the water-cooling engine with the air-cooled version, thus having better reliability, cross-country capability and engine performance at high-altitude regions. One distinct visual difference between WZ-551A and its predecessors is that for WZ-551 (Type 90) and WZ-523, there's a significant gap between the front axle and the rear pair of wheels. On the WZ-551A, the distance is the same for all axles and wheels.

The redesigned WZ-551A was certified with military designation ZSL-92 or Type 92 in 1994. Type 92 solved the problems of its predecessors and was quickly accepted into the Chinese military service. It also saw much greater export success. Type 92 was showcased to the public in the 50th National Day parade in 1999. Like its predecessor, Type 92 was also developed as a universal chassis for various weaponry platforms. Additionally, the planned 4×4 and 8×8 versions were realized in the Type 92 program as WZ-550 (4×4 chassis) and WZ-552 (8×8 chassis).

=== Further developments ===
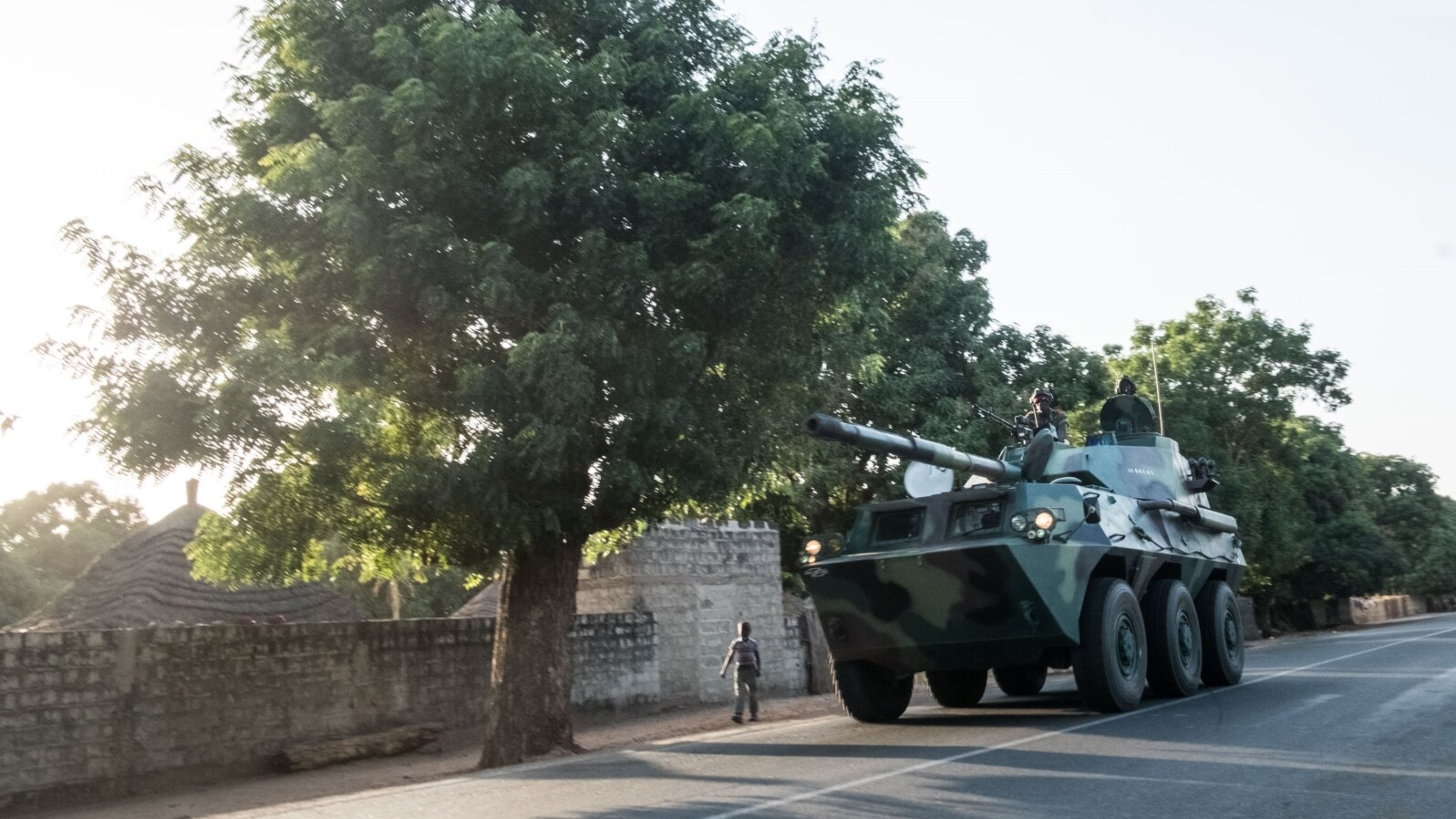
Senegalese WMA-301 near the Gambian border in 2017

The 4×4 armored personnel carrier was developed for the Chinese police forces. Chinese military also developed the HJ-9 missile carrier and mobile air defense missile system based on the WZ-550 chassis. Other variants, such as PTL-02 assaults vehicle, PLL-05 self-propelled gun-mortar, were developed based on the WZ-551 chassis. The ZSL-92 was also developed into the ZSL-92B, which replaced the 25 mm ZPT-90 with stabilized 30 mm ZPT-99 and new fire control systems.

In 1997, Chinese military reinvested interest in the development of road-mobile assault gun due to the Third Taiwan Strait Crisis. The abandoned PTL-87 program was reintroduced and a new prototype, named PTL-97, was completed in 1997. PTL-97 (Type 97) featured improved fire control system and ammunition. The PTL-97 was further refined and incorporated into the PLAGF service in 2002 as PTL-02.

In 2005, another mobile land based air defense variant of the TY-90 missile was revealed to the Chinese public, named as Yi-Tian (Chinese: 倚天) Air Defense System, or YT ADS. The weaponry includes eight TY-90 missiles, QJC-88 12.7 mm heavy machine gun and two sets of four smoke grenade dischargers. WZ-551 is the chassis of the Yi-Tian air defense system, giving the system amphibious capability and added protection. Additionally, a light solid state 3-D passive phased array radar is added to the fire control system, just above the original electro-optical fire control system, providing the ADS with greater surveillance range. The radar can be fold down for traveling and transportation.

Specifications:

- Maximum target altitude: 4 km
- Minimum target altitude: 15 meter
- Maximum target range: 6 km
- Minimum target range: 300 meter
- Maximum target speed: > 400 meter / second
- Maximum radar searching range: >20 km
- Maximum radar tracking range: 10 – 12 km
- System reaction time: 6 – 8 seconds

== Design ==
=== Chassis ===
Produced by Norinco, the WZ-551 (Type 90) first developed in 1980s and certified in 1990, but the Chinese military were not satisfied with its performance, and the design had to be modified into WZ-551A (ZSL-92) in 1994. The modification was mostly concentrated on improving the chassis and subsystems. The improved WZ-551A entered service in 1995 as the ZSL-92 IFV and ZSL-92A APC. WZ-551 chassis looks externally similar to French VAB, however they have different internal layout, and the WZ-551 chassis is much larger.

The vehicle is constructed of fully-welded steel plates, the interior is divided into three compartments with steel plates. The driver and commander sit in the front, and the engine is in the middle, with the turret basket and the passengers compartment located in the rear. The vehicle is crewed by 3 and capable of transporting 9 passengers. The automotive platform is a modified Chinese-made Tiema XC2030 6×6 truck, which is a license-built version of the all-wheel drive Mercedes-Benz 2026 truck.

=== Armament ===
The ZSL-92 (WZ-551A) infantry fighting vehicle (IFV) is equipped with a ZPT-90 25 mm cannon and a 7.62 mm Type 86 coaxial machine gun in a closed turret. The 25x183mmB ZPT-90 is based on the Type 87 anti-aircraft cannon, which is a bored-out version of the Type 85 anti-aircraft cannon, itself is a direct copy of the Soviet 23x152mmB ZU-23-2. The turret has a full 360° traverse with an elevation of -8° ~ 55°. Ammunition load for the cannon is 400 rounds, with 200 rounds carried inside the ammunition cartridges, and an additional 200 (120 high-explosive rounds and 80 armour-piercing rounds) carried in the turret. The gun can fire single, 3-round burst, 5-round burst, or fully automatic. The maximum cyclic rate of fire is 200 rounds/min. The secondary coaxial machine gun is fitted with 1,000 rounds. The autocannon is not stabilized on the ZSL-92, thus the vehicle is ineffective at firing on the move. The sighting systems are composed of three periscopes for driver, commander, and the gunner. The center periscope for driver can be replaced by an image intensifying periscope. The periscope for the gunner can be fitted with passive night-vision device, providing limited night combat capability.

The ZSL-92A (WZ-551B) armored personnel carrier (APC) is fitted only with a QJC-88 12.7 mm machine gun. The troop compartment is larger and can carry 11 passengers.

The ZSL-92B IFV (WZ-551B1) is an upgrade variant of the original ZSL-92. The new turret is equipped with a fully-stabilized ZPT-99 30 mm autocannon, a Type 86 coaxial machine gun and a missile launch rail for the SACLOS HJ-73C ATGMs positioned on the right hand side of the roof of the turret. The vehicle is fitted with modernized electronics system, including gunner thermal imaging sight, laser rangefinder, angle measurement sensor, and digital ballistic computer. The turret of ZSL-92B is very similar to that of ZBD-03 and ZBD-86A.

The PTL-02 assault gun is fitted with Type 86 smoothbore cannon, capable of launching anti-tank guided missile.

=== Protection ===
The ZSL-92 is fitted with two banks of four smoke grenade launchers on each side of the turret. On ZSL-92B, The turret was equipped with two clusters of three smoke grenade launchers (one on each side of the turret). The WZ-551 chassis is made of fully-welded steel plates, providing all around protection against small arms fire and shell splinters. The frontal plate can stop 12.7 mm machine gun fire at 200 m (220 yd). The vehicle is also fitted with ventilation system, NBC protection system. The steel-reinforced radial tire allows the vehicle to travel at reduced speeds for 100 km when punctured.

=== Mobility ===
WZ-551 family is powered by the Deutz BF8L413F 8-cylinder, turbo-charged, air-cooled diesel engine, developing 320 hp. The vehicle is equipped with mechanical ZF 5S-lllGPA manual transmission. The maximum speed is 90 km/h with 800 km of range on highway. The vehicle has off-road capability and is fully amphibious with steerable propellers behind the rear wheels.

== Operational history ==
=== Myanmar ===
The 105mm gun armed variant of the WZ-551 has seen limited combat use with the Myanmar Army. At least two have been captured by various rebel groups from the Arakan Army to the Ta'ang National Liberation Army.

=== Democratic Republic of the Congo ===
Rwandan Defence Force and its backed rebel group, the March 23 Movement, used WZ-551-based Type 92 Yitian system in the Democratic Republic of the Congo. In 2025, the rebels used WZ-551 air-defence vehicles to shoot down Armed Forces of the Democratic Republic of the Congo (FARDC) aircraft in eastern Democratic Republic of the Congo (DRC). During the 2025 Goma offensive, it was reported that Chinese CH-4 and Turkish Bayraktar TB2 drones operated by the FARDC were shot down, contributing to a sharp reduction in government air sorties over North and South Kivu.

== Variants ==
=== Domestic ===
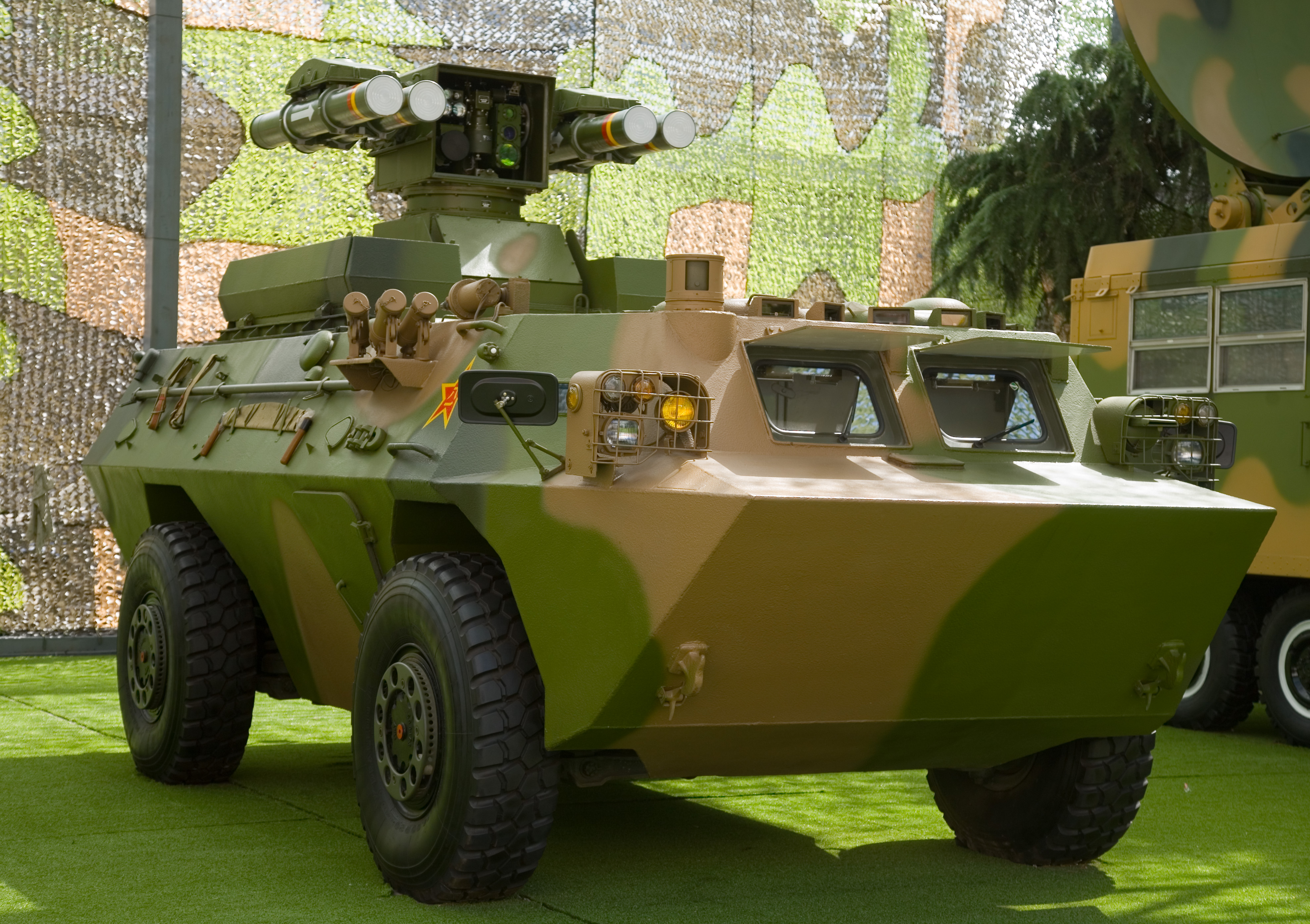
A Chinese HJ-9 anti-tank missile system mounted on a WZ550 4x4 vehicle. On display at the "Our Troops Towards The Sky" exhibition in Beijing in 2007

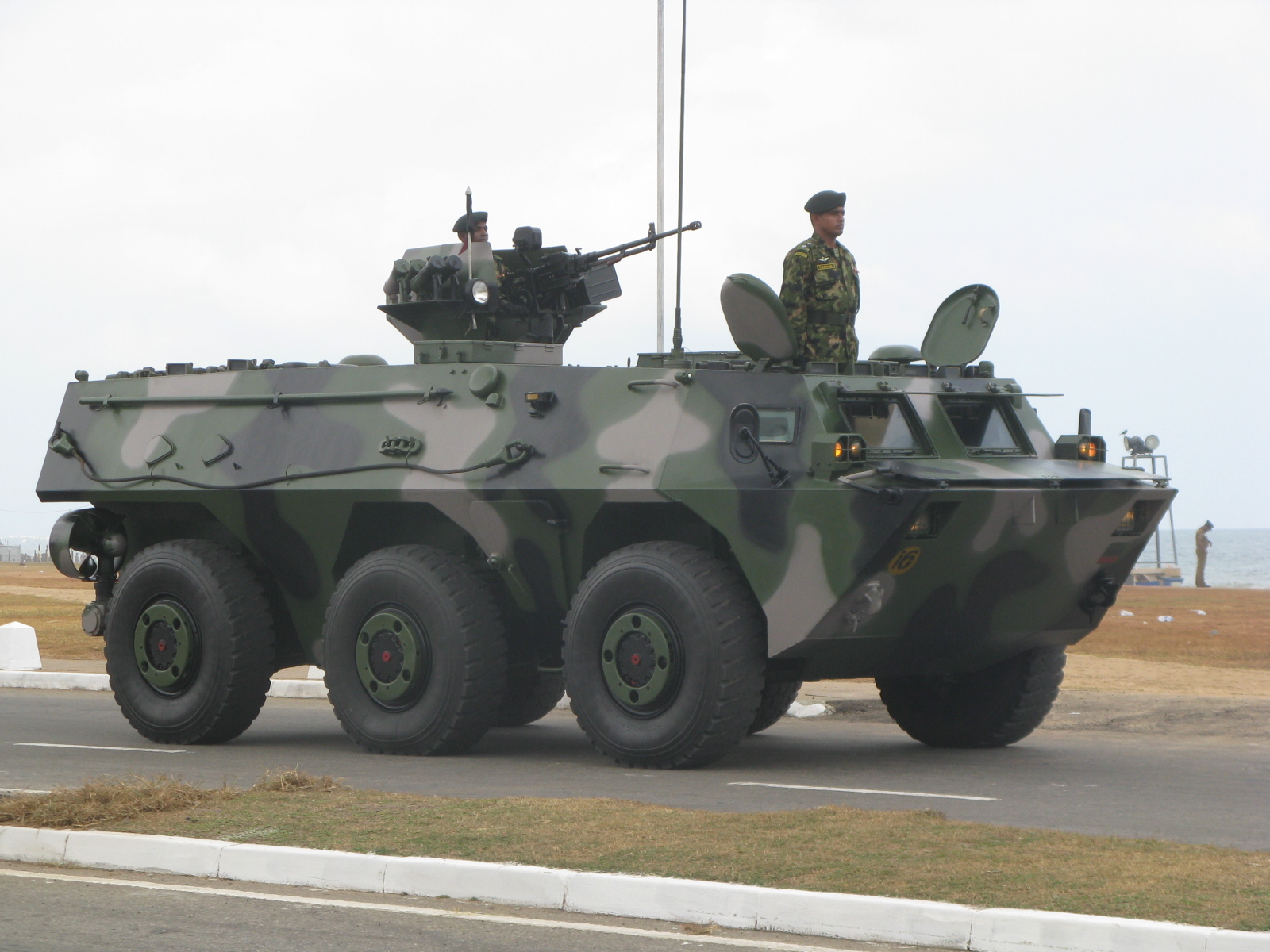
Sri Lanka ZSL-92A armored personnel carrier

Type 90 (WZ-551)
Designation ZSL-90. Original prototype.
NGV-1
Prototype with a French GIAT 25-mm autocannon equipped.
Type 92 IFV (WZ-551A)
Designation ZSL-92. Mass production version, featuring ZPT-90 25 mm autocannon capable of firing in single, 3-round burst, 5-round burst, and full auto mode.
Type 92 APC (WZ-551B)
Designation ZSL-92A. Mass production version, featuring 12.7mm armor-plated turret.
Type 92B IFV (WZ-551B1)
Designation ZSL-92B. This was an upgraded amphibious armored personnel carrier with ZPT-99 30 mm autocannon, maneuverability, and reliability.

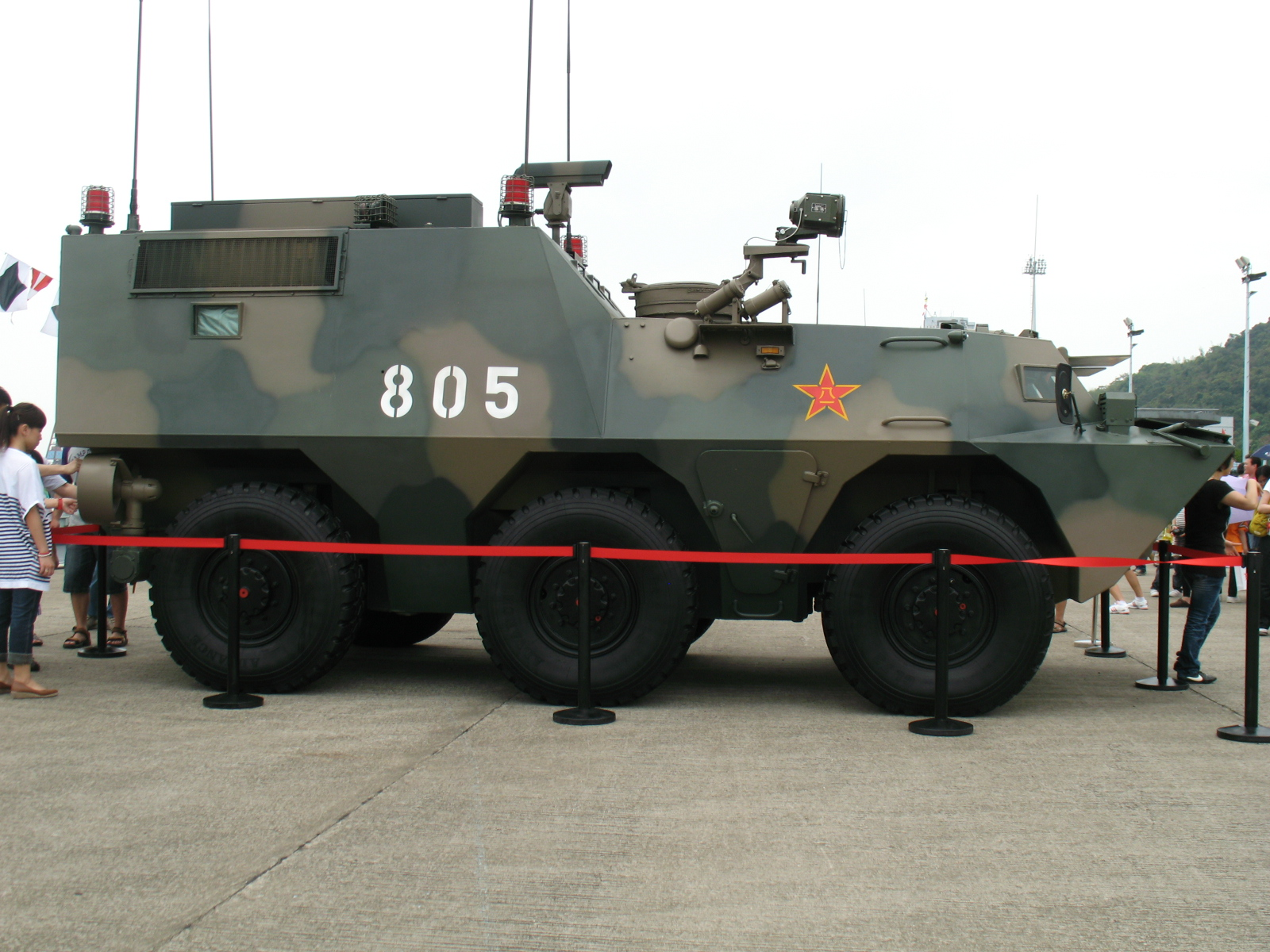
WZ-551 based armored command vehicle (ZZH-07)

WZ-551A Armored Command Vehicle
Command variant of the Type 92 with higher roof.
WZ-551D Air Defense System
WZ-551D is a 6x6 wheeled air defense vehicle developed from the WZ-551 chassis. It features four PL-9 missiles and a search/acquisition radar suite. Only one prototype was produced.
Type 92 Yitian
Air defense upgrade with TY-90 anti-air missile launchers and QJC-88 12.7 mm heavy machine gun. Equipped with a search radar and thermal-tracking sight.
WZ-550 APC
4x4 mass production version.
WZ-550 Anti-tank Missile Carrier
Designation ZSL-02B. Four HJ-9 launchers, laser designator and thermal-tracking sight are mounted on an elevated platform at the rear of the WZ-550 chassis.
PTL-87 Assault Gun
Prototype assault vehicles developed in 1980s based on modified WZ-551 chassis. Four more variants were developed and marketed by Norinco as the BK series, including BK-1970 105 mm 6x6 assault gun, BK-1990 105 mm 8x8 assault gun, modified BK-1990 with 120 mm gun, and modified BK-1990 with 122 mm howitzer. In the end, none of the developed prototypes went into production.
PTL-97 Assault Gun
Based on BK-1770 100 mm 6x6 assault gun prototype. Equipped with the Type 86 100 mm high velocity smoothbore cannon. The vehicle went into limited production in 1997. Later replaced by the improved PTL-02.
PTL-02 Assault Gun
Debut in 2001. PTL-02 is a self-propelled assault gun (or tank destroyer) based on the WZ-551 chassis. Equipped with the Type 86 100 mm high velocity smoothbore cannon with a muzzle brake.
PLL-05 Self-Propelled Gun-Mortar
Debut in 2001. PLL-05 is a self-propelled 120mm gun-mortar based on the WZ-551.
XJZ-92 Armored Recovery Vehicle
ARV based on ZSL-92.

=== Export ===
VN2
Upgraded export variant with 30mm cannon, either in a one-man turret or an UW4 30 mm remote weapons station. It has only two firing ports on each side for its passengers. The VN2C is a mine-resistant variant with applique armors and higher ground clearance to achieve STANAG 4569 Level 3 in terms of both ballistic and mine blast protection.
CS/VN9
6x6 infantry combat vehicle with a 30 mm autocannon. It is characterized by the lack of armored shutters for its bulletproof windshields (and therefore the driver's and commander's stations have no periscopes), as well as three vision blocks and firing ports on each side for its passengers.
WMA301 Assault Gun
Derivative of the PTL-02, featuring a redesigned turret and armed with a 105 mm NATO-compatible gun.
Tianlong 6 (Sky Dragon 6)
Export version of the Type 92 Yi-Tian air defense system.

=== Ethiopia ===
Ethiopia
Ethiopia converted a number of WZ-551 APC to self-propelled artillery by mounting a 122mm D-30 howitzer.

== Operators ==
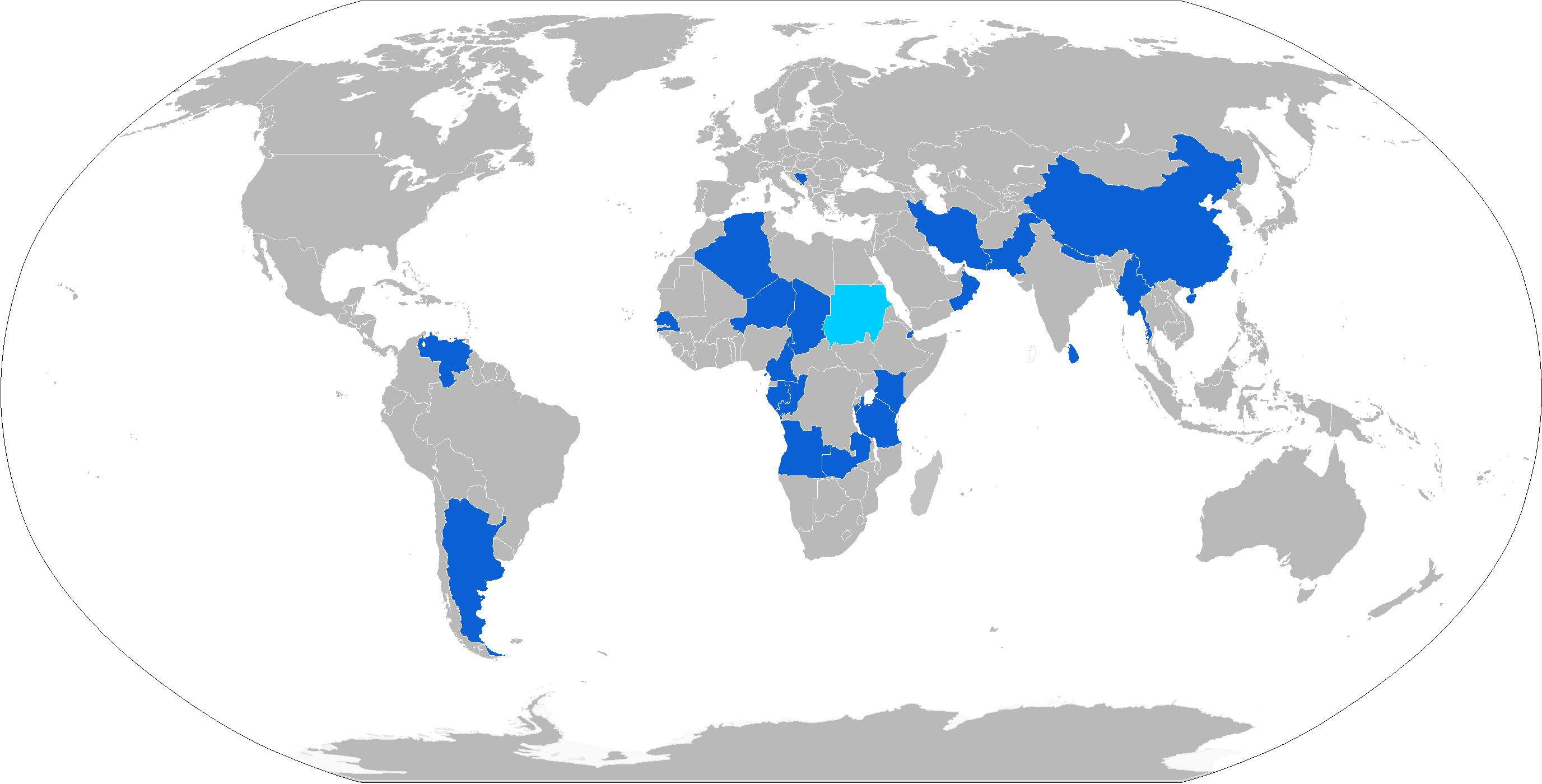
Operators Licensed variants

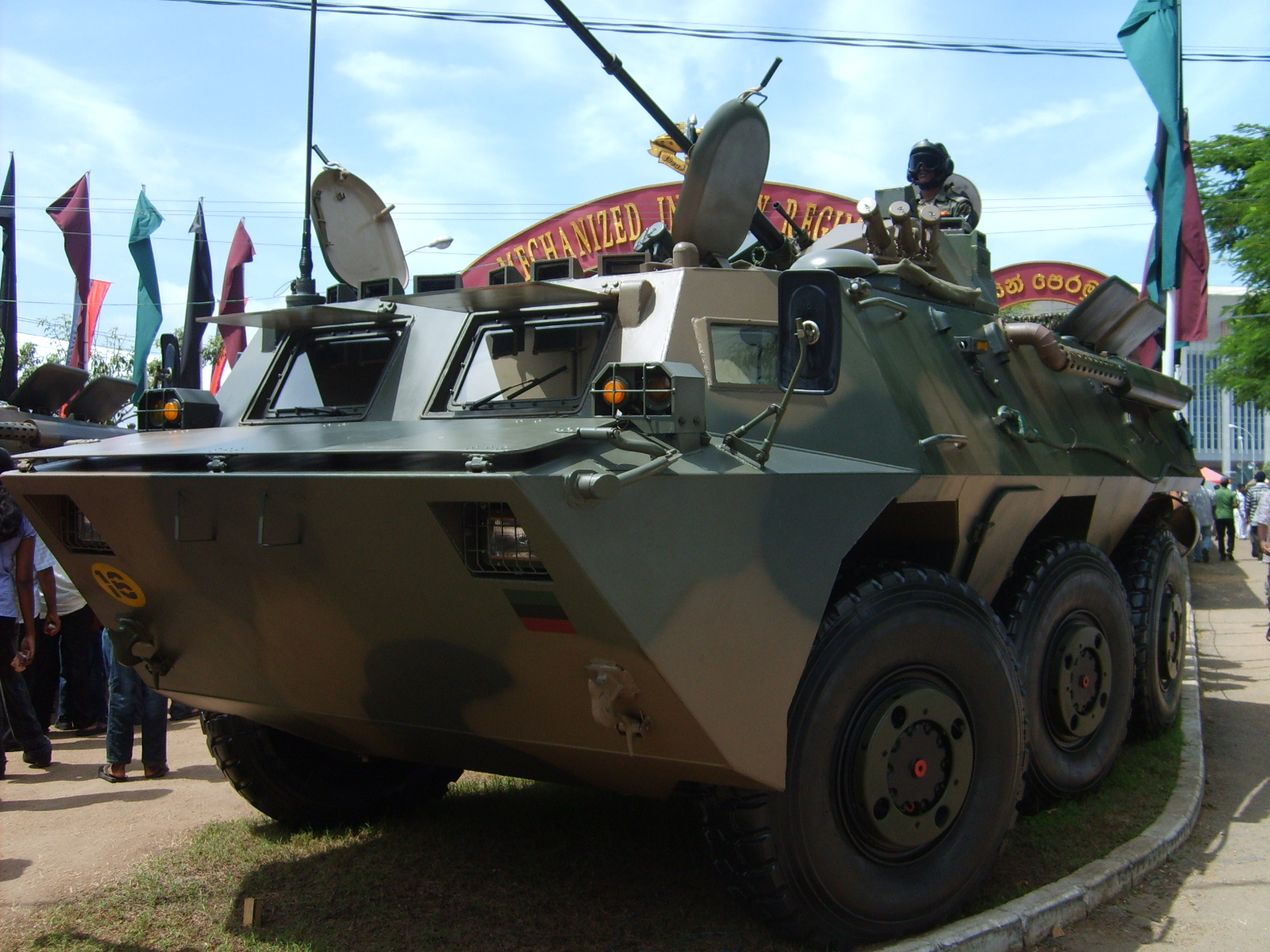
ZSL-92B of the Sri Lanka Army, armed with 30 mm autocannon

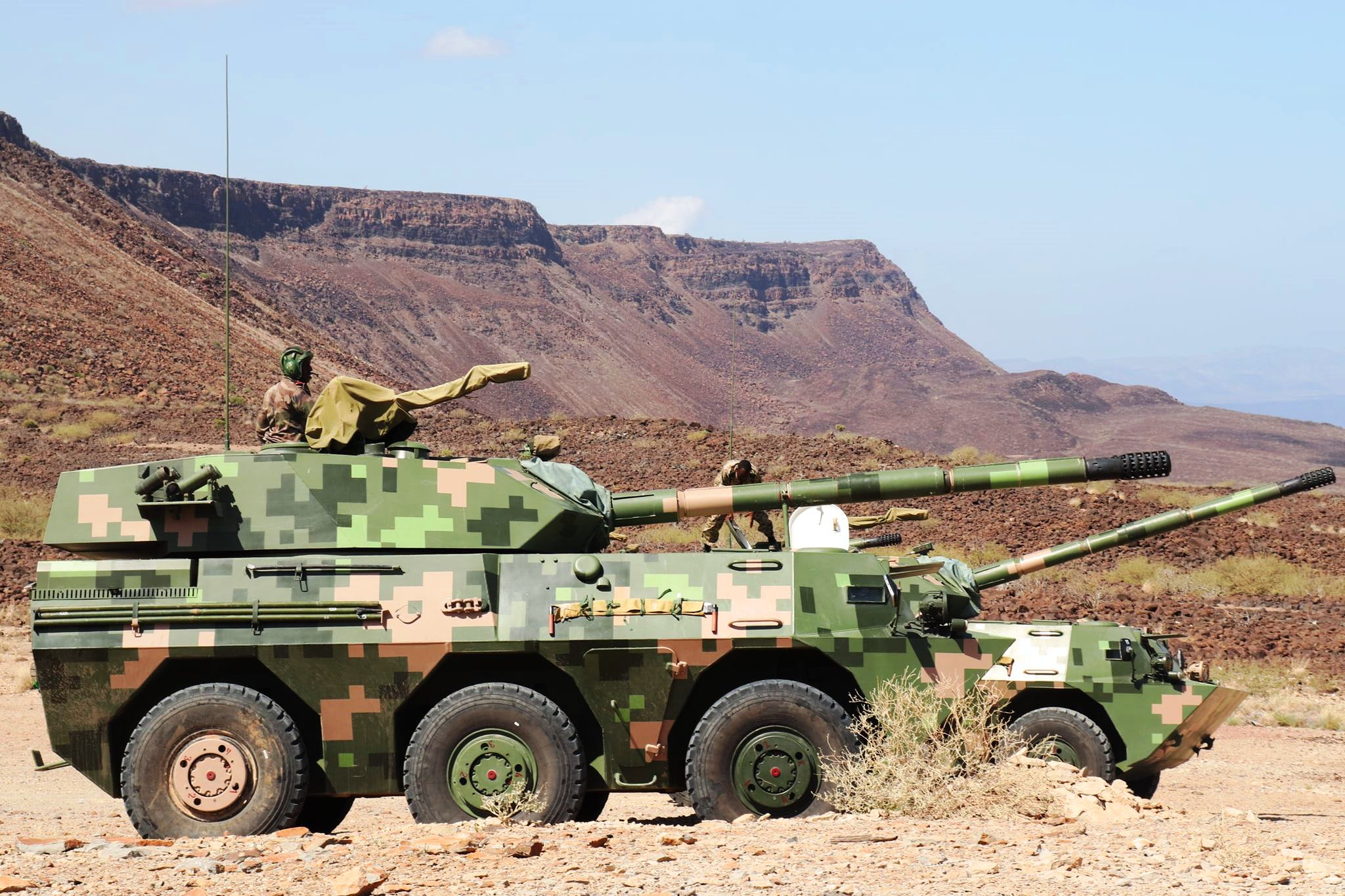
Djiboutian Army WMA-301 during a demonstration at Maryama base

- Algeria - Algerian Army
- Angola - Angolan Army: 10 WMA-301 Assaulter and 5 WZ-551 delivered in 2016
- Argentina - Argentine Army: 4
- Bosnia and Herzegovina - Armed Forces of Bosnia and Herzegovina: WMA301 Assaulter
- Burkina Faso - Burkina Faso Armed Forces: 6 WMA301 Assaulter, 1 WZ-551 command vehicle
- Burundi - Military of Burundi: 15 WZ-551
- Cameroon - Cameroonian Armed Forces: 12 WMA-301 Assaulter Some seen in anti-Boko Haram operations.
- Chad - Chadian Ground Forces: 30 WMA-301 Assaulter
- China - People's Liberation Army Ground Force - 3,000+ units as of 2021. 550 units of ZSL-92; 700 units of ZSL-92A; 600 units of ZSL-92B; 450 units of ZSL-02B; 250 units of PTL-02; 450 units of PLL-05; Uncounted units of other variants.
- Djibouti - Djiboutian Army: 3+ WMA-301 Assaulter
- Equatorial Guinea - Armed Forces of Equatorial Guinea WZ551 recovery, IFV, and fire support versions
- Ethiopia - Ethiopian Ground Forces: 20 Type 92
- Gabon - WMA-301
- Guinea
- Indonesia - Indonesian Army
- Iran - Islamic Republic of Iran Army: 150
- Ivory Coast
- Kenya - Kenyan Army: 35
- Laos - Laotian Army: WZ-551 based Tianlong 6 air defense system.
- Mali - With VN2C APCs.
- Mauritania - Armed Forces of Mauritania: 10+ WMA301 Assaulter
- Mozambique - Mozambique Defence Armed Forces: 30-35
- Myanmar - Myanmar Army: a large amount of Type-92 APC, 150+ units of WMA-301 Assaulter (also known as PTL-02 Tank Destroyer) and 76 units of Type-92 ARV.
- Nepal - Nepalese Army: 5
- Niger - Niger Armed Forces: 2 WZ-551, 1 destroyed by Boko Haram on 3 June 2016
- Oman - Omani Royal Guard: 50, including CP and ambulance version
- Papua New Guinea - Papua New Guinea Defence Force: 4 donated by China
- Pakistan - Pakistan Army
- Senegal - Senegal Army: 12 WMA-301 Assaulter and 1 WZ-551 command post
- Sri Lanka - Sri Lanka Army: 190 in service 2021( exact numbers of wz 551 in service unknown)
- Sudan - Sudan People's Armed Forces: 50 assembled in Sudan under name Shateef-2
- Tanzania - Tanzanian Army: 10
- Tigray - Tigray Defense Forces
- Venezuela - Venezuelan Army
- Zambia- Zambian Army: 5 WZ-551B
- Zimbabwe - Zimbabwe National Army: 8 WMA-301 Assaulter, 8 ZSL-92A and 8 ZSL-92B

== See also ==
- WZ523 – (China)
- Type 08 – (China)
- Anoa – (Indonesia)
- Véhicule de l'Avant Blindé/VAB – (France)
- Patria Pasi – (Finland)
- TPz Fuchs – (West Germany)
- Ratel IFV – (South Africa)
