= Type 07P =

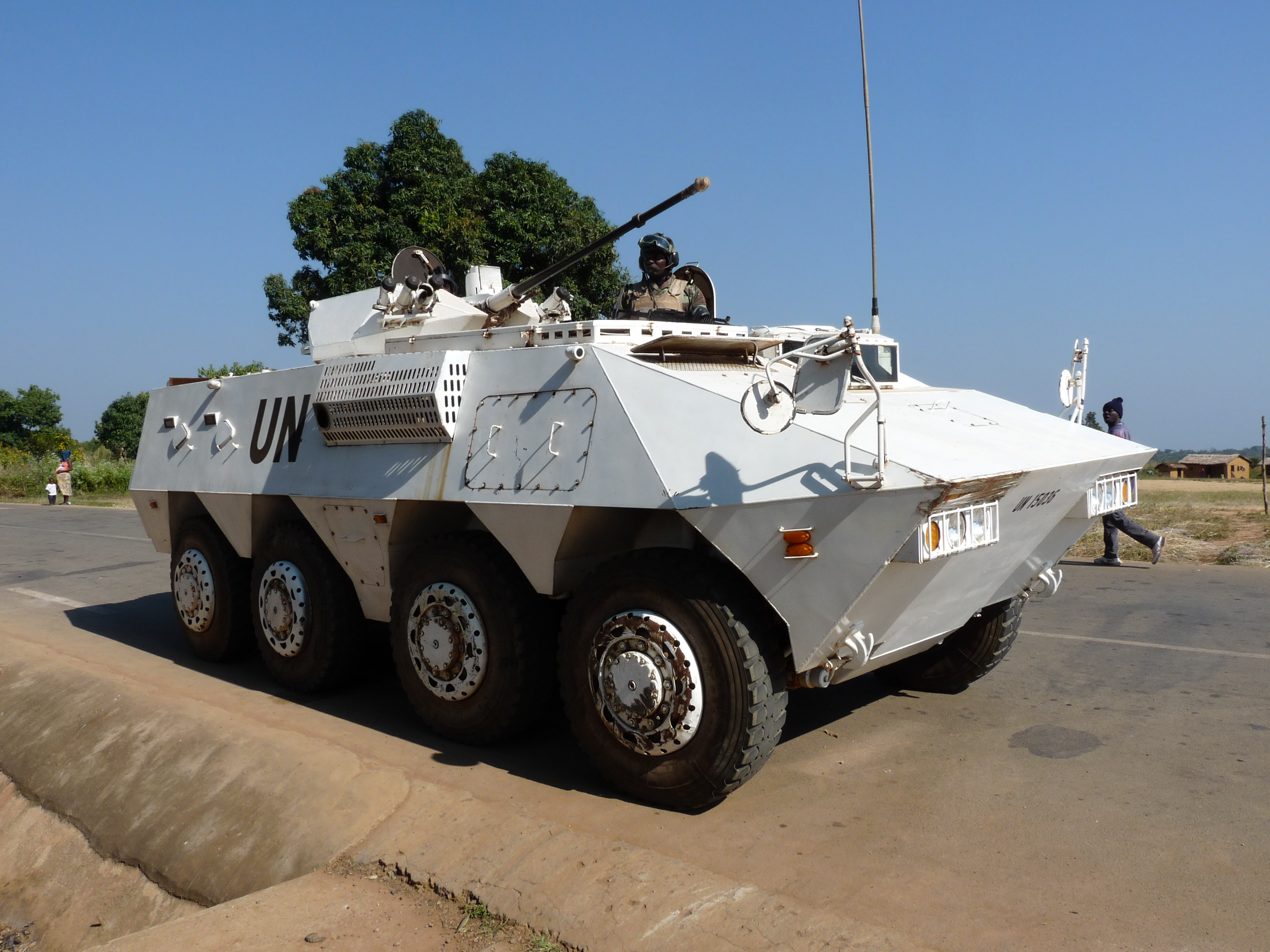
- Cameroonian Type 07P in service with MINUSCA, 2015
- Type: Infantry fighting vehicle
- Place of origin: China

Service history
- Used by: Cameroon; Tanzania
- Wars: Boko Haram insurgency

Production history
- Manufacturer: Poly Technologies

Specifications
- Mass: 20 t (20 long tons; 22 short tons)
- Length: 8 m (26 ft 3 in)
- Width: 3 m (9 ft 10 in)
- Height: 2.1 m (6 ft 11 in)
- Crew: 3
- Passengers: 7
- Main armament: 30 mm autocannon
- Secondary armament: 7.62 machine gun
- Engine: Diesel
- Operational range: 600 km (370 mi)
- Maximum speed: 100 km/h (62 mph)

The Type 07P is a Chinese infantry fighting vehicle manufactured by Poly Technologies.

== Variants ==
- Standard version
- Command post vehicle
- Recovery vehicle
- YLGA01 internal security vehicle
- Type 07PA self-propelled howitzer, also designated CS/SM2, (using the turret of the PLL-05)

== Service ==
Twenty Type 07P, including one command and one recovery vehicle, have been delivered to Cameroon. In service with Cameroon Armed Forces Armoured Reconnaissance Battalion (Bataillon Blindé de Reconnaissance), they have seen combat during Boko Haram insurgency. One of them destroyed a Boko Haram Saurer 4K 4FA.

The Type 07PA is in service with Tanzania. Twelve guns were delivered in 2014.

== See also ==
- Type 08
