= PLL-05 =

PLL-05 Self-Propelled Gun-Mortar
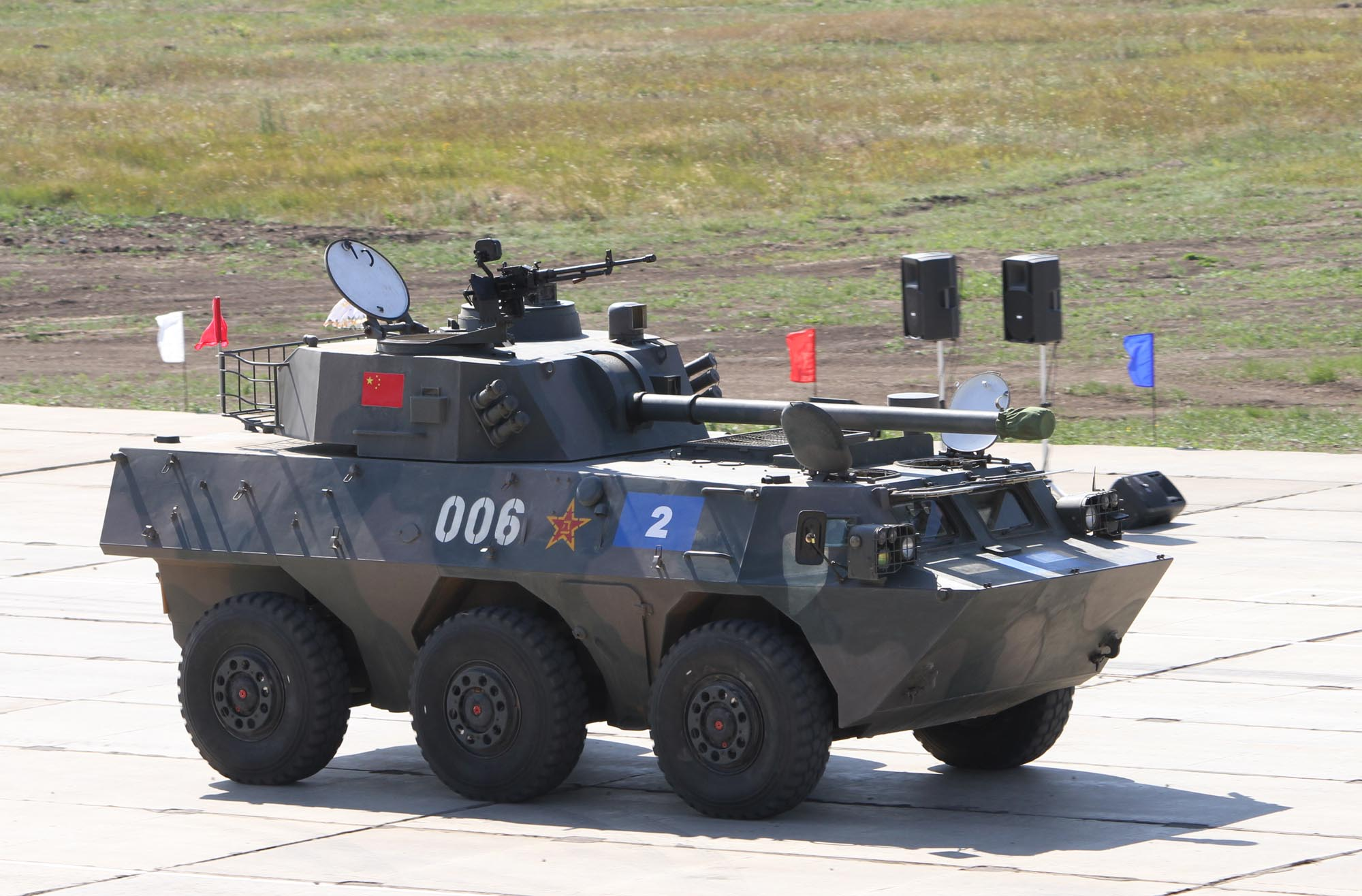
- Type: Self-propelled gun-mortar
- Place of origin: China

Service history
- Used by: China

Production history
- Designed: 1999–2003
- Manufacturer: Norinco
- Produced: 2005–present
- No. built: 500+

Specifications
- Mass: 16.5 t (16.2 long tons; 18.2 short tons)
- Length: 663 cm (261 in)
- Width: 280 cm (110 in)
- Height: 320 cm (130 in)
- Crew: 4
- Main armament: 120mm gun-mortar
- Secondary armament: QJC-88 12.7×108mm HMG
- Engine: Diesel; 240 kW (320 hp)
- Operational range: 720 km (450 mi)
- Maximum speed: 80 km/h (50 mph)

The PLL-05 is a Chinese self-propelled gun-mortar in use by Chinese mechanised infantry formations. Conceptually it is similar to the Russian 2S23 "Nona-SVK" (the turret and weapon system of the 2S9 Nona mounted on a BTR-80 chassis) three of which China purchased for evaluation; at one time it was reported that China would purchase 100 of the Russian vehicles however this failed to occur, nor does it appear that there was a formal transfer of technology to China. The Chinese system features a longer barreled weapon mounted on the Type 92 variant of the WZ551 armored personnel carrier.

The gun-mortar is a lighter and more compact artillery piece than the traditional gun-howitzer at the expense of maximum range, which has improved accuracy, a higher rate of fire, and having the capability of using direct fire in comparison to standard infantry mortars.

== Description ==
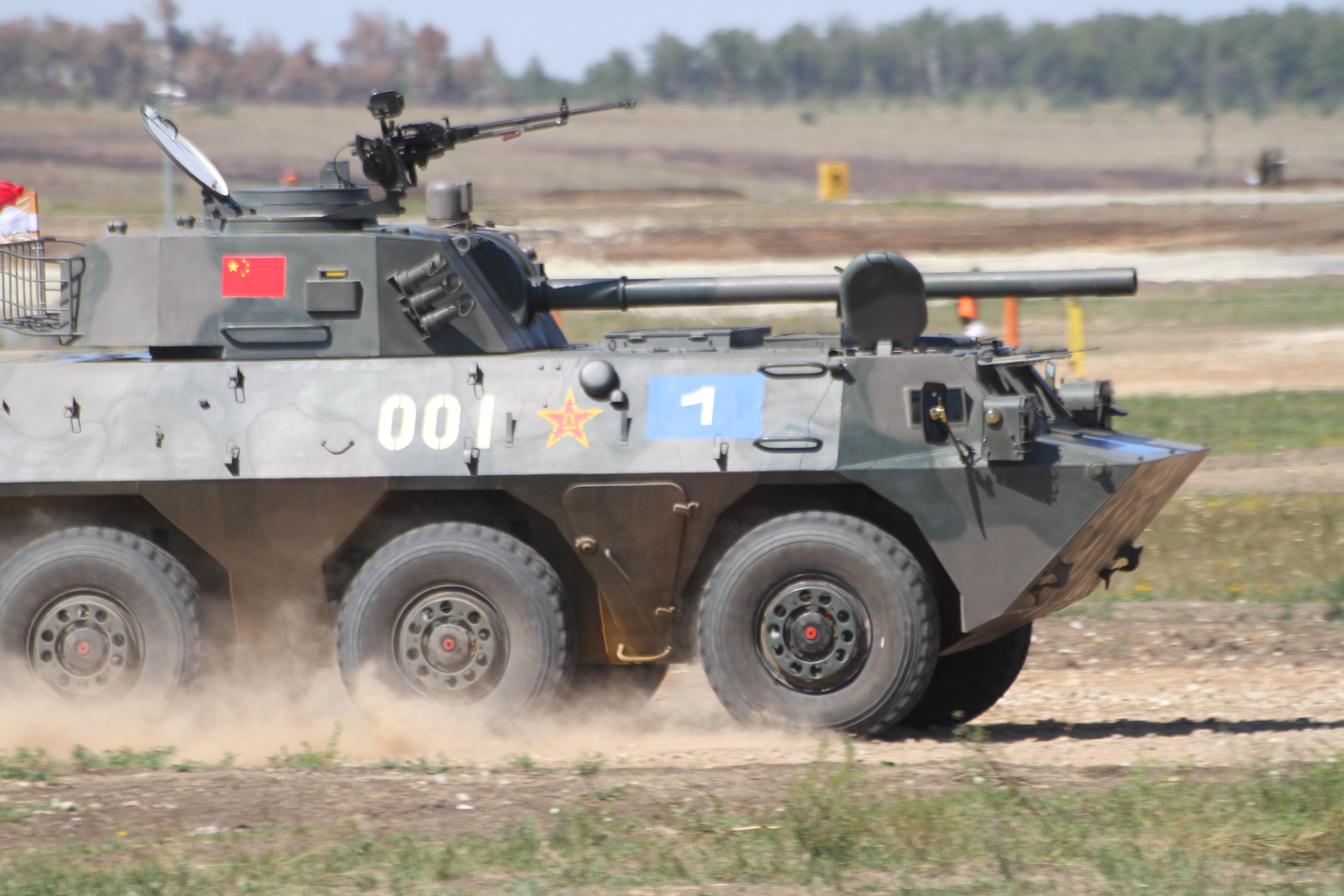
PLL-05

The main armament of the PLL-05 is a 120 mm gun-mortar in a turret capable of 360° traverse, this turret being mounted on a 6x6 WZ551 armored personnel carrier chassis. The mortar has an elevation range of -4° to +80° and is capable of both direct and indirect fire. It is fitted with an autoloader and can be fired in fully automatic, semi-automatic and fully manual modes, the maximum rate of fire being around 8-10 rounds per minute, with a sustained rate of fire being about 4-6 rounds per minute. Ammunition capacity is 36 rounds and include mortar shells for indirect fire and anti-tank shells for direct fire, maximum range with standard mortar rounds being about 9 km (5.6 mi). Secondary armament is a 12.7×108mm QJC-88 heavy machine gun mounted on the turret roof. The crew of four consists of the vehicle commander, gunner, loader and driver. Mobility of the PPL-05 is similar to that of that base WZ551 and the vehicle can swim by way of two rear-mounted propellers.

== History ==
The existence of the PLL-05 was first revealed in 2001 with the system entering service some years later. The PLL-05 was one of the systems that participated in the military parade as part of the 60th anniversary of the People's Republic of China celebrations.

The turret of the PLL-05 was reused on the Type 07PA, a self-propelled gun designed for export.

== Operators ==
China

- People's Liberation Army Ground Force - approximately 500 units of PLL-05 as of 2021.

Tanzania

- Tanzania People's Defense Force
