= Dongfeng EQ245/EQ2100 =

Chinese military troop/cargo truck

The EQ245/EQ2100 is a 3.5 tonne capacity, six-wheel drive troop/cargo carrier truck developed and built by Dongfeng Motor Corporation and used by the People's Liberation Army of the People's Republic of China for transport.

It entered service in the 1980s as the EQ245 and renamed EQ2100E in the 1990s.
