= Type 80 machine gun =

Type 80 general-purpose machine gun
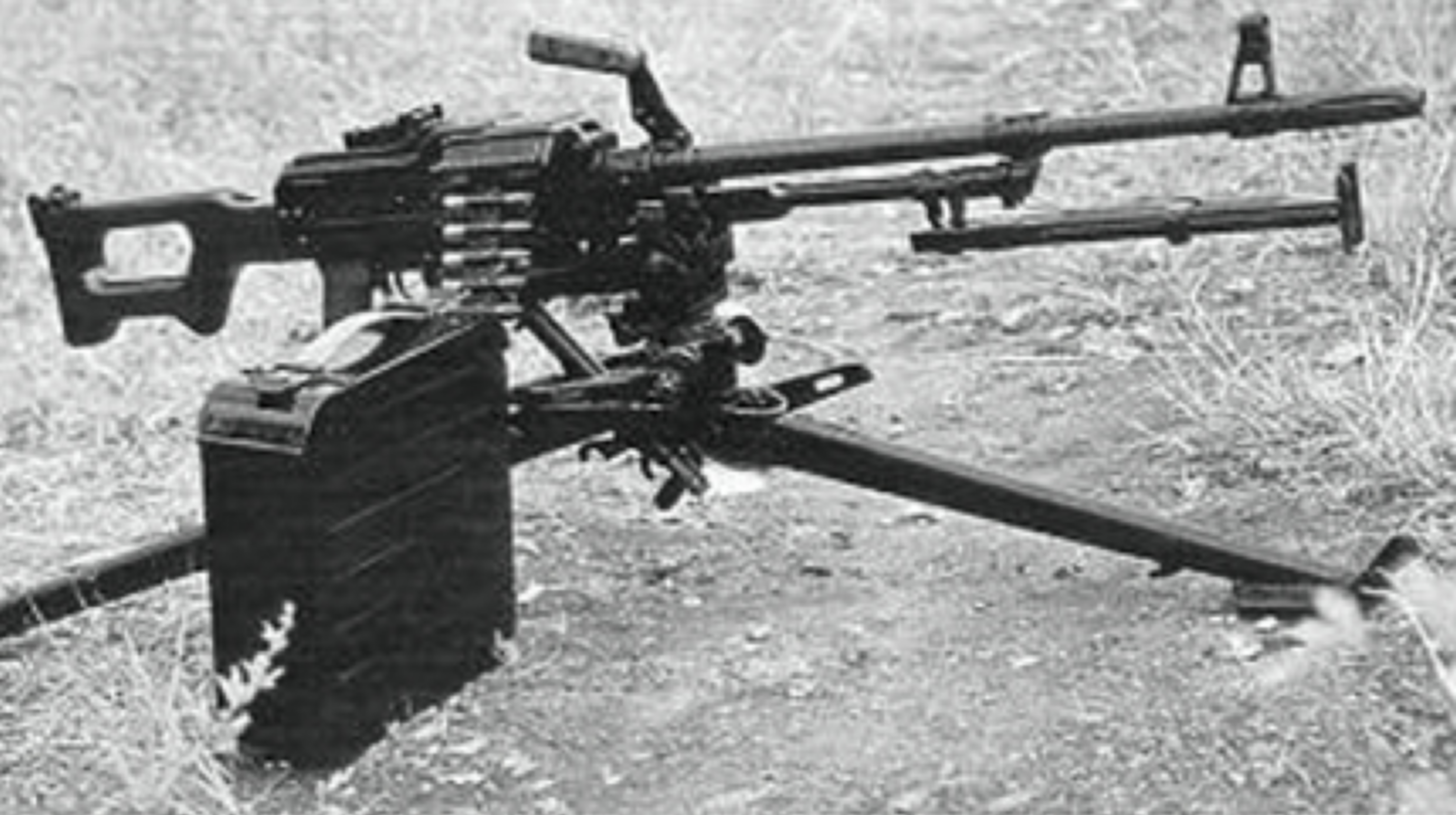
- Type 80 GPMG in tripod mount
- Type: General-purpose machine gun
- Place of origin: China

Service history
- In service: 1983–present
- Used by: See Users
- Wars: Lebanese Civil War; Kurdistan Workers' Party insurgency Second Sudanese Civil War; War in Darfur; Sri Lankan Civil War; Somali civil war (2009–present); South Sudanese ethnic violence Sudanese conflict Syrian Civil War; Boko Haram insurgency Islamic State insurgency in Iraq (2017–present)

Production history
- Designer: Mikhail Kalashnikov
- Designed: 1980
- Manufacturer: Norinco; Changfeng Machinery (For CS/LM4 variant); Military Industry Corporation
- Produced: 1983–present
- Variants: See Variants

Specifications
- Mass: 12.6 kg (27.78 lb)
- Length: 1,192 mm (46.9 in)
- Barrel length: 658 mm (25.9 in)
- Cartridge: 7.62×54mmR; 7.62×51 NATO (For CF 06 version)
- Action: Gas-operated, open bolt
- Rate of fire: 700–800 round/min
- Muzzle velocity: 840 m/s (2,776 ft/s)
- Effective firing range: 1,640 yd (100—1,500 m sight adjustments)
- Feed system: Belts in 100/200/250 round boxes
- Sights: Open sights. Optical/Night vision scope can be outfitted.

The Type 80 (Chinese: 80式通用机枪) is a general-purpose machine gun (GPMG) manufactured by Norinco in China, based on the Soviet PKM. The machine gun was certified for design finalisation in 1980 and entered the PLA service in the mid-1980s, specifically in 1983. The Type 80 was intended as a successor to the Chinese independently developed Type 67, doing well in tests conducted in the Chengdu Military Region before it was dropped and instead, opted to keep the Type 67 GPMG in use.

Only a few Type 80s were used in the People's Liberation Army Marine Corps and airborne units, and a modified Type 80, named as Type 86, was then accepted as vehicle coaxial machine gun by PLA armor units.

== History ==
The development of the GPMG started when Chinese firearms engineers studied PKMs that were captured from Vietnamese forces during the Sino-Vietnamese War.

Changfeng Machinery was subcontracted to create the CS/LM4 in order to have it chambered to 7.62 NATO caliber. The CS/LM4 has been marketed to countries that have used Soviet/East European/Chinese-made small arms, but have oriented to use NATO-based ammo.

== Design ==
The Type 80 uses the 7.62×54mmR round. It is a gas-operated, air-cooled, belt-fed, fully automatic firearm. It can fire on both the tripod and the foldable bipod on the gas tube below the barrel.

Belts are used from 100-round boxes in the light machine gun configurations, and from 200- or 250-round boxes in tripod-mounted applications. The machine gun uses an open iron sight, but can also be fitted with an optical or night-vision sight.

== Variants ==
- Type 80 - The copy of the PKM GPMG, chambered in 7.62×54mmR. The modernized version is copy of PKP "Pecheneg"
- Type 86 - Coaxial machine gun used as a secondary weapon for vehicles.
- CF06 - An export-only version of the Type 80, which is chambered for 7.62 NATO ammunition. A study on creating the CF06 started with an evaluation from July to December 2006 with a prototype review in February 2007. Production started from April to May 2007 before the CF06 was officially formalized in January 2008. It's equipped with polymer furniture instead of the wooden furniture used in the original Type 80. The barrel life consist of 25,000 rounds, with 12,500 rounds for each one of two barrels supplied. It's also known as the CS/LM4 GPMG (Chinese: CS/LM 4型通用机枪) in 2008.

=== Foreign variants ===
- Mokhtar - A variant of the Type 80 made by the Sudanese Military Industry Corporation in 7.62x54R caliber.

== Users ==
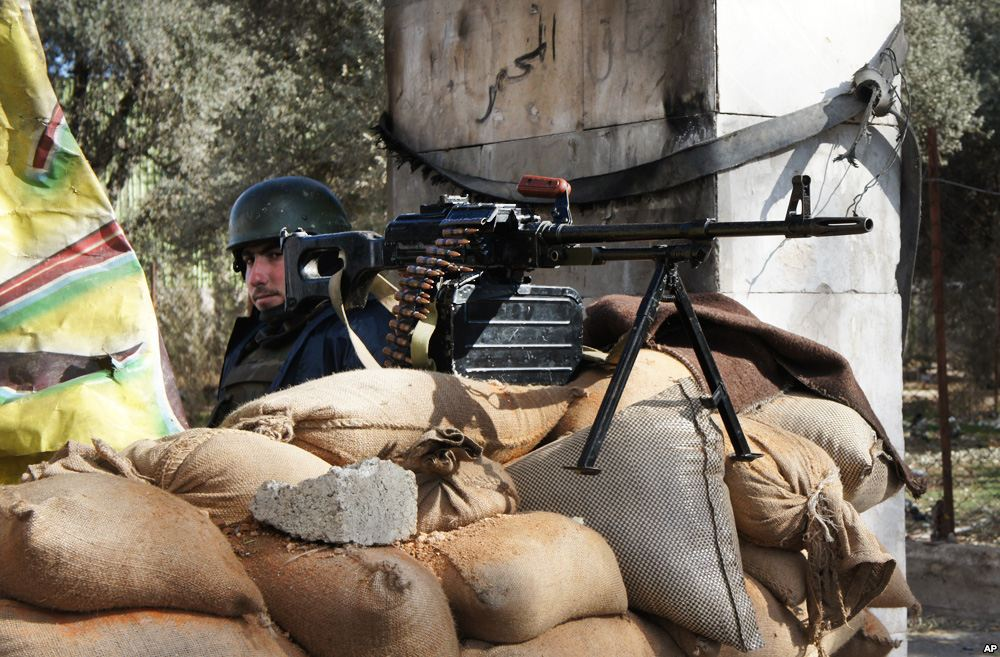
Syrian Soldier with Type-80.

- Cameroon
- China: Currently in service in small numbers with Chinese special forces.
- Croatia: In service with Croatian police units during the country's war of independence.
- India: Captured from various insurgents in the Kashmir valley and used by Indian troops.
- Malta: Armed Forces of Malta
- Niger
- South Sudan

- South Sudan Democratic Movement: Mokhtar
- South Sudan Defence Forces: Type 80

- Sudan: Manufactured locally as Mokhtar. Also Chinese-made Type 80s.
- Somalia
- Sri Lanka: In service with the Sri Lanka Army. Around 200 Type 80 GPMGs were supplied by Norinco as part of several defense agreements between China and Sri Lanka.
- Syria
- Turkey: Purchased 2800 Type 80s for Border guards and Infantry Commando Brigades.

=== Non-State Actors ===
- Boko Haram
- Hamas
- Islamic State
- Kurdistan Workers' Party
- (Libya) Libyan National Army
- South Sudan Democratic Movement
- South Sudan Liberation Movement
- Nuer militias in South Sudan

== See also ==
- PK/PKM: The original.
- UKM-2000: Polish version of the PKM for 7.62mm NATO.
- Zastava M84: Yugoslavian/Serbian copy of the PKM.
