= TR-85 =

TR-85 M1
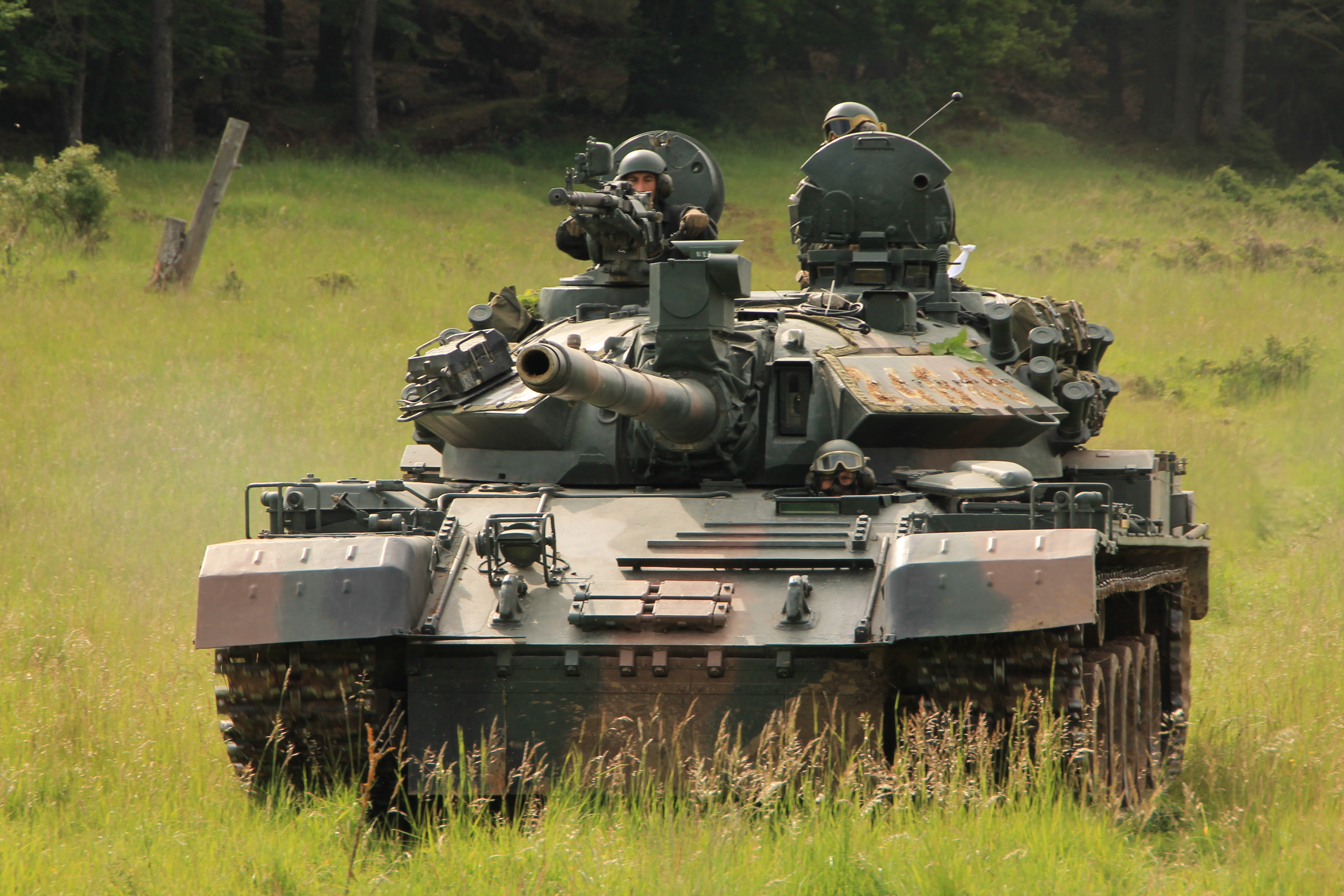
- A TR-85M1 during a multinational exercise in Germany, 2014.
- Type: Main battle tank
- Place of origin: Romania

Service history
- In service: 1986–present
- Used by: Romanian Land Forces
- Wars: Romanian Revolution of 1989

Production history
- Designer: Institute 111; Direcția Tancuri și Auto
- Designed: 1978–1986
- Manufacturer: Mechanical Factory Bucharest (part of ROMARM military consortium).
- Produced: 1986–1990 (TR-85); 1997–2009 (TR-85M1 upgrade)
- No. built: 617
- Variants: TR-85, TR-85 M1, TR-85M1R, DMT-85 M1

Specifications (TR-85M1 Bizonul)
- Mass: 50 tonnes (55.12 tons)
- Length: 9.92 m (32.5 ft) (with gun forward)
- Width: 3.43 m (11.3 ft)
- Height: 2.38 m (7.8 ft)
- Crew: 4 (commander, driver, gunner, loader)
- Armor: turret: 320 + 20 mm add-on composite armour (580mm of RHAe) hull: 200 mm composite armour
- Main armament: 100 mm gun A-308; 41 rounds
- Secondary armament: 7.62 mm coaxial PKT machine gun 4595 rounds 12.7 mm DShK AA machine gun 750 rounds 81 mm smoke grenade launcher (20 grenades); 2 four-barreled flare launchers
- Engine: Model 8VS-A2T2M C.N. ROMARM S.A, 8-cyl., 26.5 liter turbo charged direct injection diesel 860 hp (640 kW) at 2300 rpm
- Power/weight: 17.2 hp/tonne
- Transmission: THM-5800 hydromechanic (4 fwd, 2 rev gears)
- Suspension: Torsion bar with eight telescopic hydro-gas shock absorbers
- Operational range: 400 km (250 mi)
- Maximum speed: 60 km/h (37 mph)

The TR-85 is a main battle tank designed for the Romanian Land Forces. Based on the TR-77-580, the TR-85 tank was developed from 1978 to 1985 and produced from 1986 until 1990. A modernization program was initiated in March 1994 to upgrade the TR-85 tanks to NATO standards. The result was the TR-85M1 Bizonul ("Bison") third-generation main battle tank, currently the most modern tank in service with the Romanian Land Forces. The TR-85M1 uses a T-block powerpack with the V8 Romanian 860 hp engine 8VS-A2T2M (similar in concept to the T-block V10 MTU-MB838 with 830 hp, used with the Leopard 1), an improved turret, a locally designed "Ciclop" fire control system (with cross-wind sensor, laser rangefinder and night vision), new 100 mm BM-412 Sg (Romanian version of M309 100mm round produced by Elbit Systems) armour-piercing fin-stabilized discarding sabot (APFSDS-T) projectiles and a fully redesigned suspension with 6 road wheels on each side, protected by metal side skirts. Combat weight is 50 tons.

== Predecessor: TR-580 ==
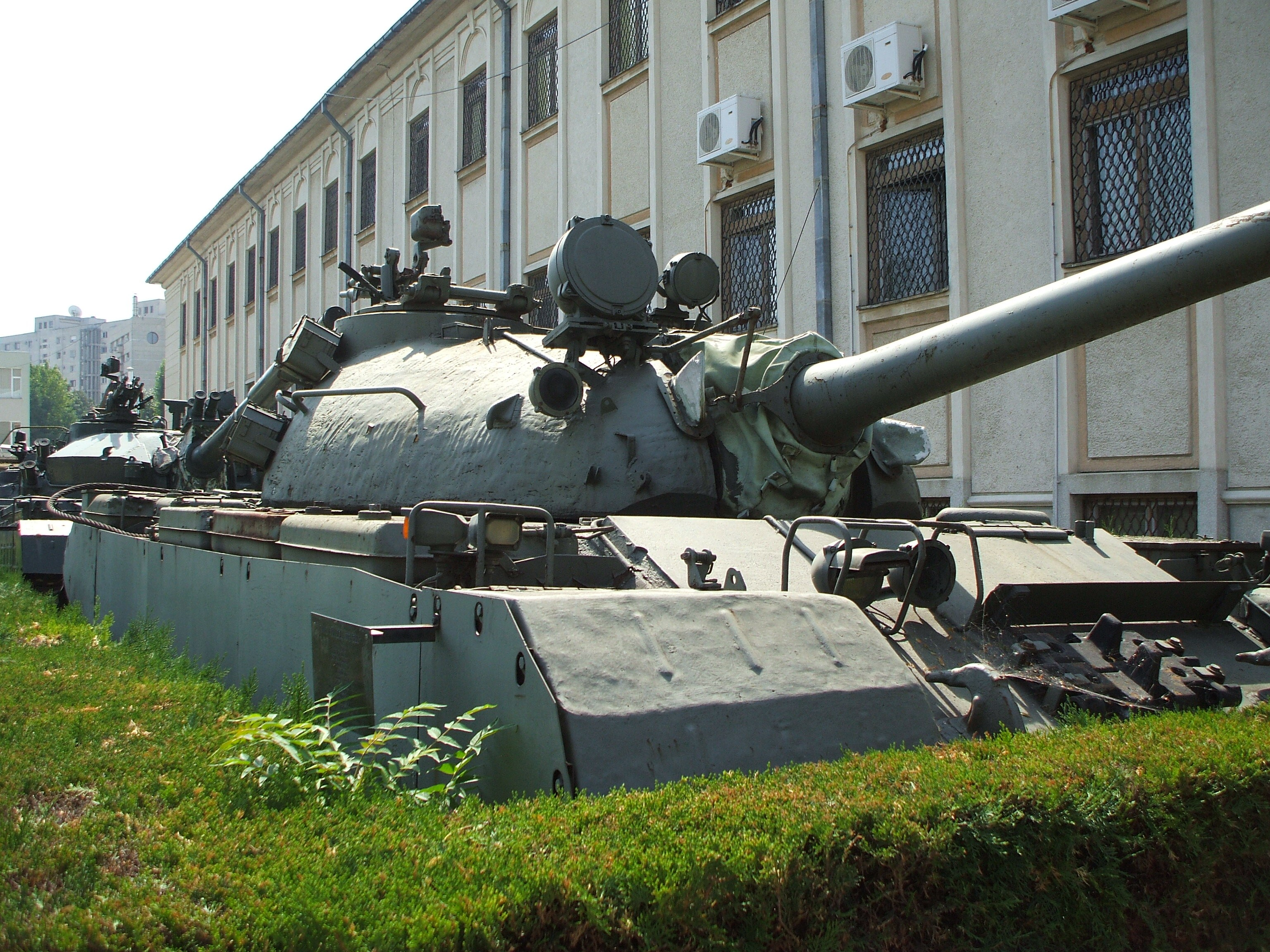
TR-580 at National Military Museum, Romania.

After the Warsaw Pact invasion of Czechoslovakia, Communist Romania adopted a new national defense doctrine. However, this new doctrine required a self-sustainable local defense industry. In April 1968 a preliminary report regarding the production of tanks in Romania was proposed to the National Defense Council of Romania. The report was ratified by the Defense Council on 13 October 1972. The development of a Romanian medium tank effectively began on 13 May 1974. The Romanian Defense Council wrote the specifications for the medium tank. The new vehicle would have a weight of approximately 40 tons, a 100 mm main gun and a 500 horse power engine.

The next step taken was the production of 400 TR-580/TR-77 tank and even if the local arms industry lacked the experience required to design and produce a medium tank from scratch the Communist government did not buy the license for the T-55 tank. The initial batch (the prototype and the first 10 tanks), officially named the TR-77 tank (Tanc românesc model 1977 Romanian Tank model 1977), was intended to use the Leopard 1 engine and, as a result, the hull was extended, having 6 road wheels instead of the usual 5 of the T-55 tank.

However, because of the political need to reach the established production figures and the refusal of Krauss-Maffei to deliver technology to a Warsaw Pact member, the medium tank, known as the TR-77-580 or TR-580 (Tanc Românesc model 1977 cu motor de 580 cp – Romanian Tank with 580 hp engine), was built using the V-55 engine of the T-55 tank and the extended chassis. The TR-77-580 tank was developed between 1974 and 1980 and was produced between 1979 and 1985.

It is often alleged that TR-77 was a copy of T-55 but only a very small portion of its equipment were carried over from the Soviet tank: night vision gunner's periscope, ammo, coax MG and probably the main guns sight, the general shape of the turret and temporarily the engine. However, the interior layout was different.

== Development ==
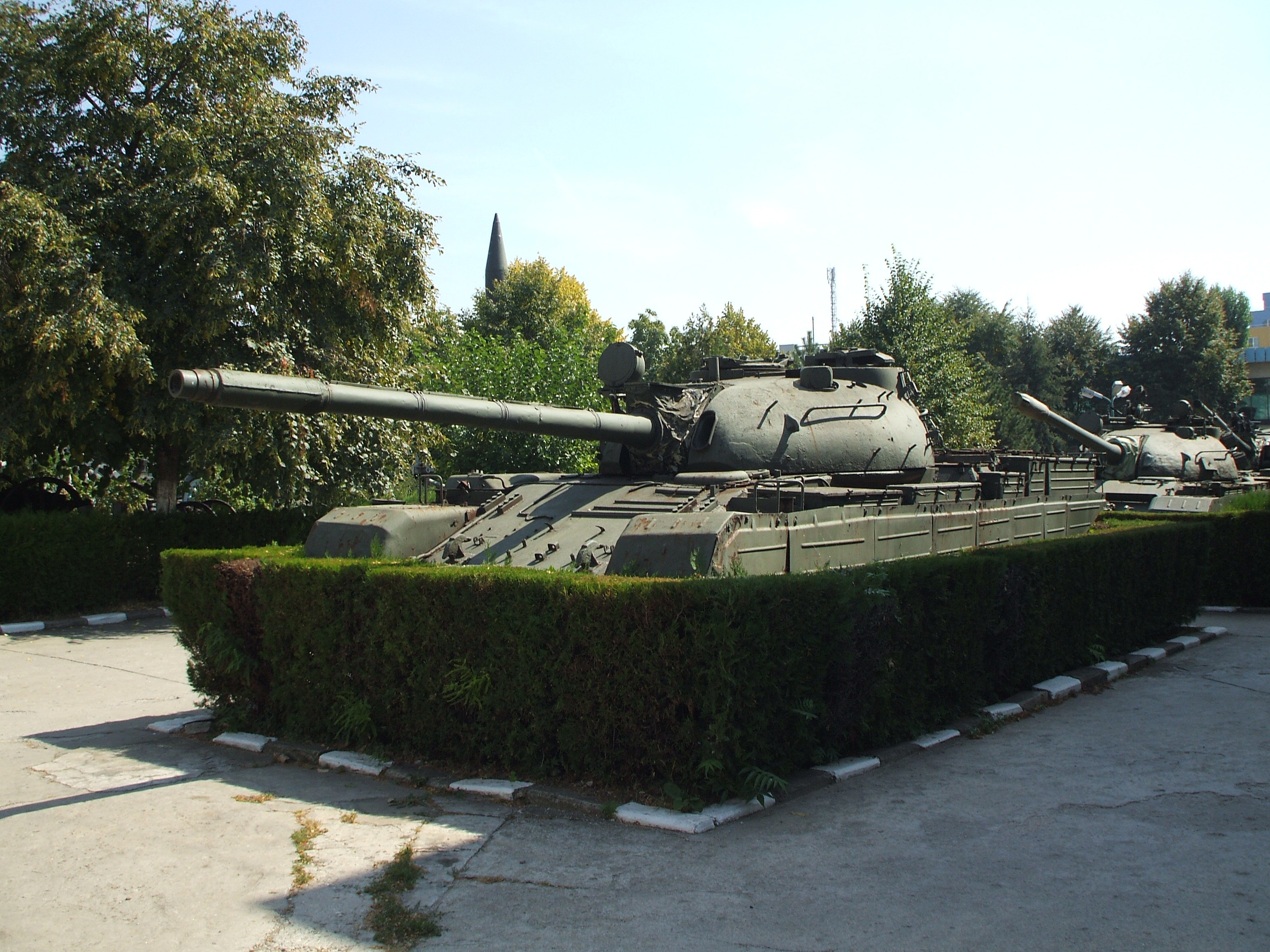
TR-85-800 (foreground) and TR-77-580 (right) at the "King Ferdinand I" National Military Museum in Bucharest.

While the TR-77 was developed, from 1974 the Romanian engineers continued work on a reverse engineered version of the 800-horsepower MTU Leopard 1 engine and transmission. The work came to a halt, as the engineers lacked the experience to reverse engineer such complex designs. By 1976 however, Institutul Național de Motoare Termice (National institute for thermal motors) stated that it could design an engine based on the Leopard 1 diesel engine model using available technology and solutions. Also, the hydromechanic transmission was designed by the ICSITEM research institute from Bucharest based on an available model and produced by Hidromecanica Brașov factory, thus completing the T-block powerpack. The engine and transmission were designed between 1974 and 1982, using foreign technology. Ion Mihai Pacepa, a two-star Romanian Securitate general and the highest-ranking intelligence official ever to have defected from the former Eastern Bloc, later asserted in his book Red Horizons: Chronicles of a Communist Spy Chief that the engine technology was obtained using spy rings and confidential assistance from the Federal Republic of Germany.

The new tank was officially named the TR-85-800 (Tanc Românesc model 1985 cu motor de 800cp – Romanian Tank model 1985 with 800 hp engine) and was designed between 1978 and 1986. The engine had a maximum output of 830 horse power. The suspension was redesigned and the turret, while bearing a strong resemblance to the T-55 series, was actually different.

== Production ==
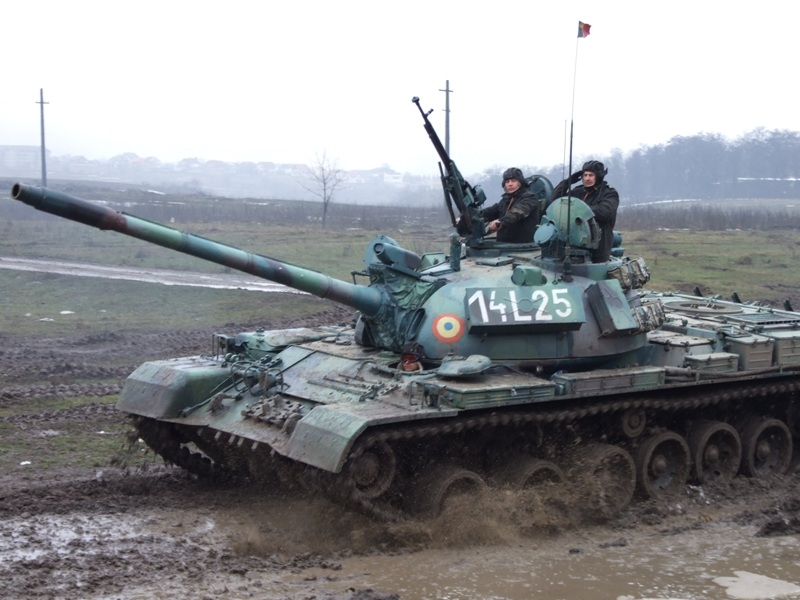
TR-85 tank without side skirts.

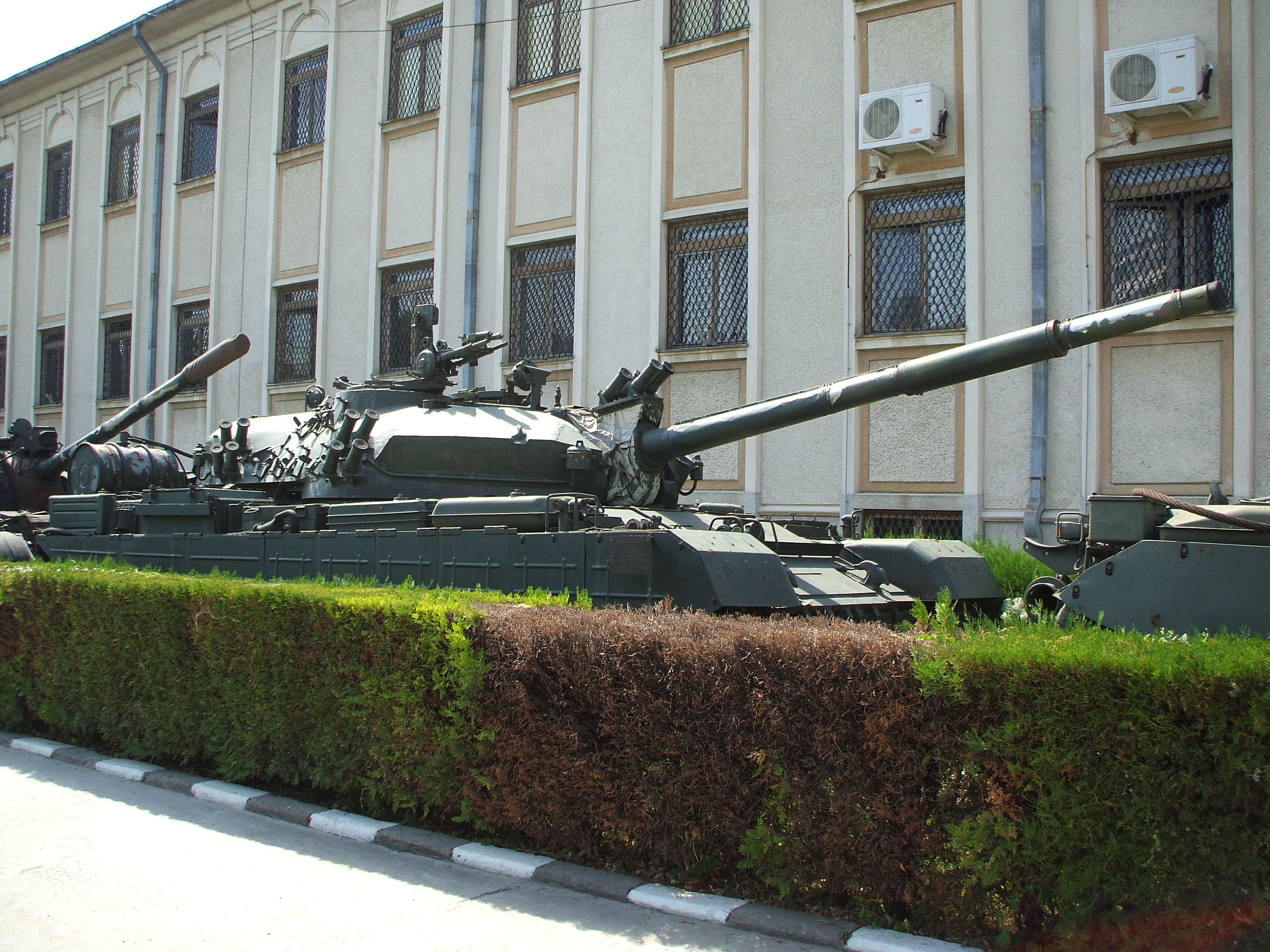
TR-85M1A (early version of the TR-85M1) on display at the National Military Museum in Bucharest.

The main tank factory was established by decree nr.514 in December 1978 at FMGS division (Fabrica De Mașini Grele Speciale - Special Heavy Machinery Factory) of the 23 August plant (now known as FAUR) in Bucharest. The construction of this tank factory was finalized in 1980. The factory was a militarized zone and was top secret, requiring a special permit to enter. By 1983, the FMGS tank factory could produce 210 tanks per year. The TR-85 tank was produced between 1986 and 1990 at rate of approximately 100 tanks per year.

The TR-85 tank was soon found to be mechanically unreliable during early tests. Teething problems included high fuel and oil consumption, engine and transmission problems and chronic oil leakage. Furthermore, the Ciclop fire control system was unreliable because of the poor quality of electronics. The laser rangefinder was not integrated with the daylight aiming system and only a limited number of corrections could be inserted in the ballistic fire-control computer. Problems were made worse when Nicolae Ceaușescu decided to cancel in July 1982 all imports of special equipment for the arms industry. At one point, Ceaușescu threatened to stop tank production altogether because of the poor manufacturing quality. The initial teething problems were not corrected until after the fall of communism in Romania when the Romanian engineers used foreign parts to improve TR-85's reliability.

== Modernization program (TR-85M1 Bizonul) ==
In March 1994, the Romanian General Staff initiated the modernization program of the TR-85 tanks by order no. 1429. On 14 April 1994, the upgrade program was approved by the Supreme Council of National Defense and development of the new tank, officially designated TR-85M1 Bizonul (The Bison), began in 1996 when two prototypes were built. The aim of the program was to upgrade the TR-85 to NATO standards by improving the firepower, protection, mobility, the communication systems and the reliability of the engine, transmission and the braking system.

The modernization program involved both foreign companies (most of them from France), such as Aerospatiale Matra, Sagem, Kollmorgen-Artus, Racal, and local defense companies such as the ROMARM military consortium, METRA (Military Equipment and Technologies Research Agency), Electromagnetica, FAUR, Elprof, Aeroteh, IOR, Prooptica, Artego, Arsenal Reșița, Metav, Forsev, Anticorozivul, IEMI, Rolast, Aerostar and IOEL. The result of the modernization program, the TR-85M1 tank, is compliant with NATO standards.

== Design ==
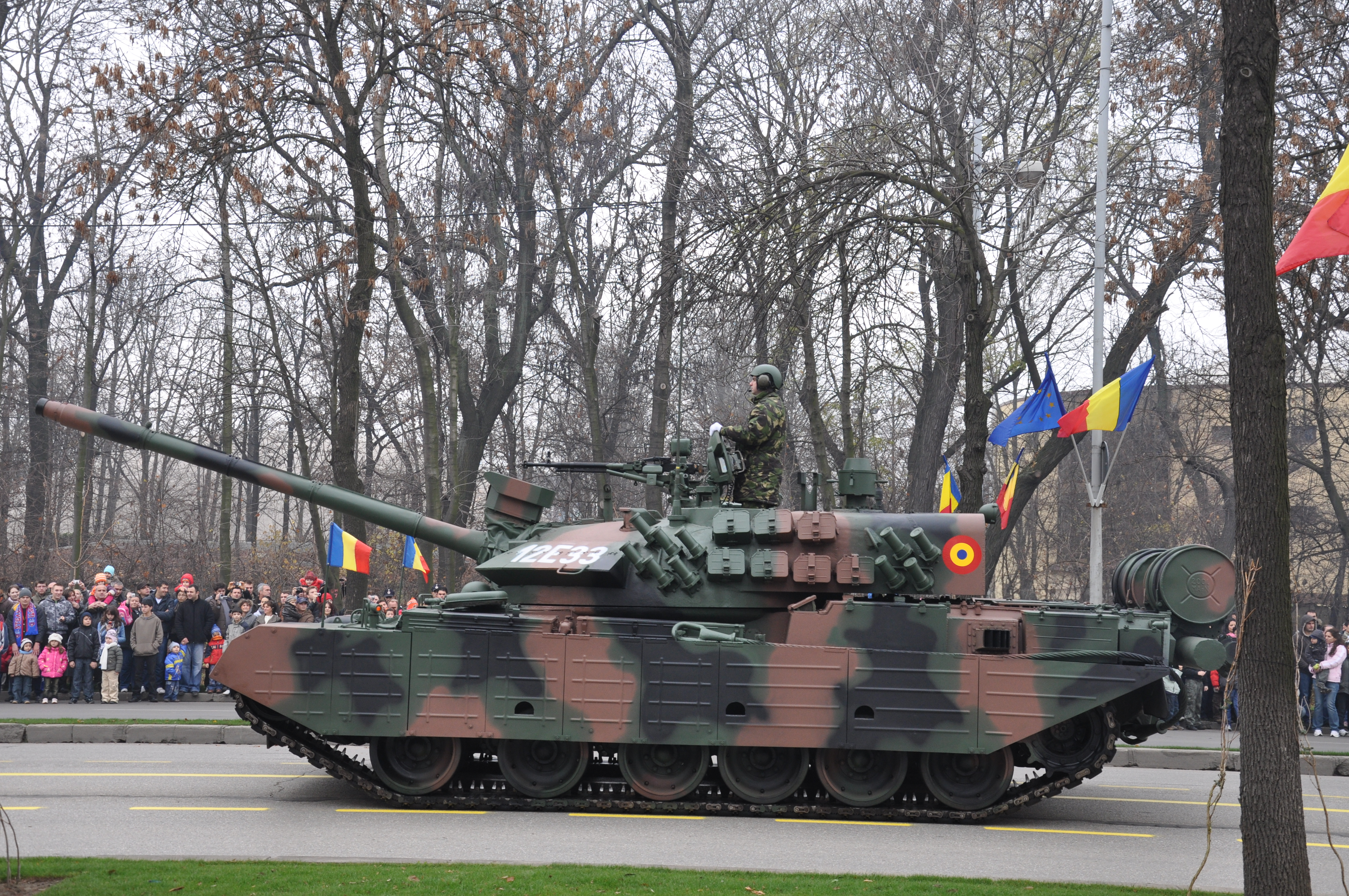
The six smoke grenades and four flares on the side of the turret.

=== Countermeasures ===
==== Concealment ====
The turret is fitted with two six-barreled 81mm smoke grenade launchers and two four-barreled flare launchers. The system can create a thick smoke that blocks both vision and thermal imaging. The tank is also equipped with a smoke screen generator that is triggered by the driver. When activated, diesel fuel is injected into the hot exhaust, creating the thick smoke. The TR-85M1 is equipped with laser illumination warning sensors that can automatically trigger the GFM-76 smoke grenades and flares, thus disrupting the guidance systems of thermal and infrared guided missiles. The SAILR (Sistem de Avertizare la Iluminarea Laser și Radar, laser and radar illumination warning system) laser warning receiver can locate and identify the threat, warning the crew and triggering the DLC (Dispozitivul de Lansare Contramăsuri, Countermeasures Launching Device).

==== Armour ====
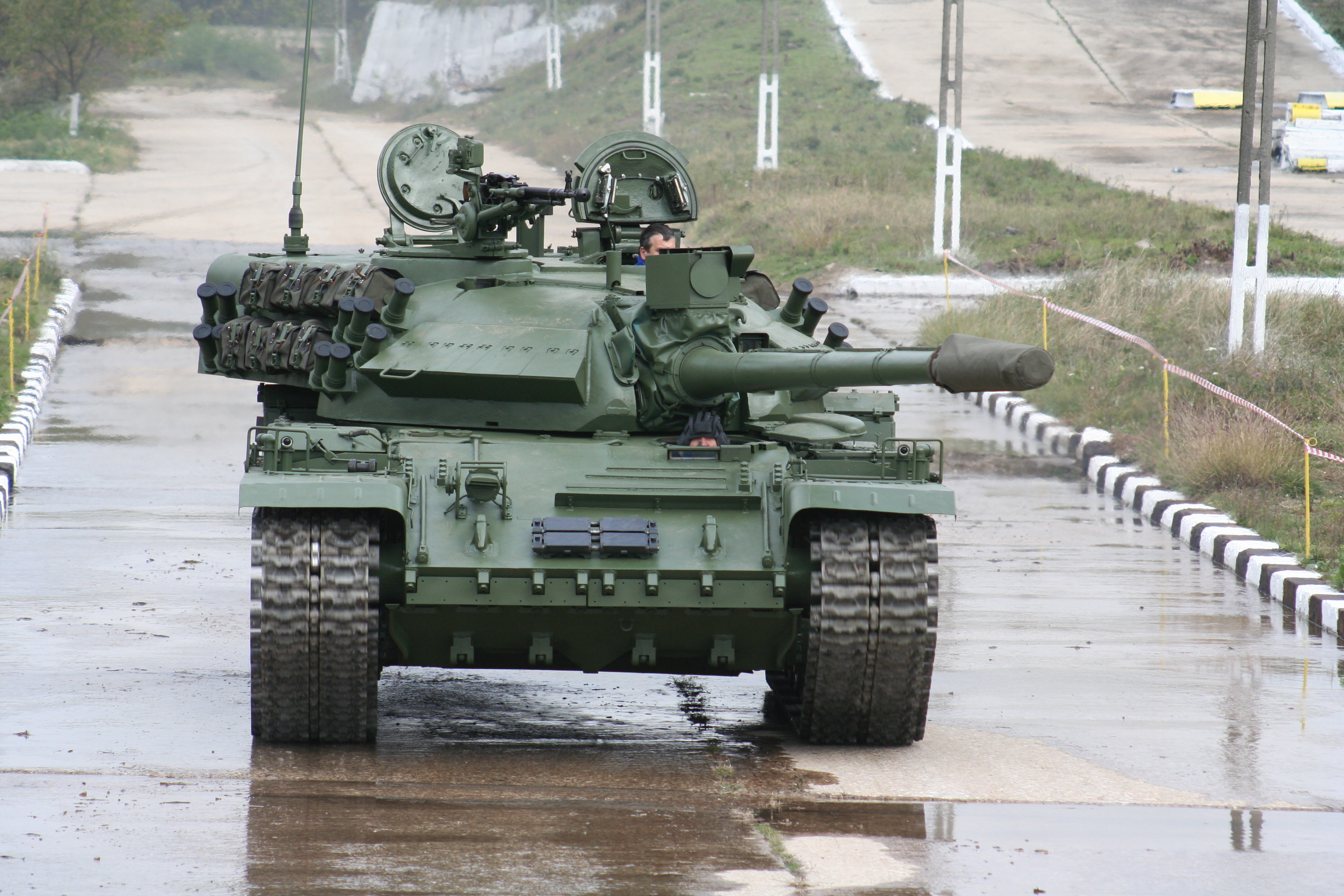
TR-85M1 with its factory single green paint scheme.

The armour of the TR-85M1 tank has a maximum thickness of 200 mm (multilayered) for the hull and 320 + 20 mm add-on armour on the turret. However, the armour is sloped and gives a total of 580mm or RHAe. The 20 mm add-on armour on the front of the turret has a modular appearance with a triangular profile. Although it might look like bricks of explosive reactive armour, the add-on composite armour is designed this way for easy replacement after combat damage. The tank also has side skirts as a protection against shaped charges. The metal side skirts have three holes each that form steps for the crew to reach the roof hatches. On the sides of the turret there are ammunition boxes for the heavy antiaircraft DShK machine gun. The upper glacis plate has two track segments, while the lower glacis plate can be fitted with steel screens or a mine roller. The TR-85M1 tank also has NBC protection and an improved, rapid fire suppression system using non-toxic agents. The system, designed by L'Hotellier, protects both the crew and the engine compartment using halon. The modernized version adds a mine protection plate and a bar for the driver, which increases protection against mines and improvised explosive devices. Also, the older TR-85 tanks have a conventional driver's seat bolted on the floor, whereas the M1 version has a parachute-harness like arrangement. In this way, the driver has no contact with the hull except on the pedals and is out of the shockwave area of exploding land mines or IEDs.

=== Armament ===
==== Primary armament ====
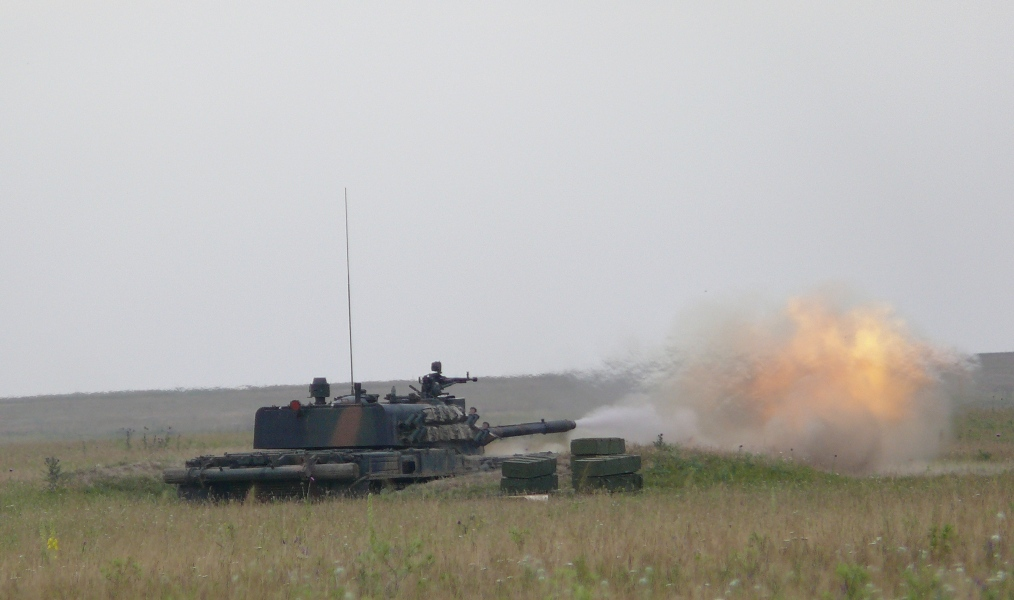
A TR-85M1 of the 631st Tank Battalion fires at a target during a military exercise.

The main armament of the TR-85M1 is the 100 mm A308 rifled tank gun (an adaptation of the M1977 towed anti-tank gun made by Arsenal Reșița) that was also fitted to the TR-77 tanks. The TR-85M1 has a rate of fire of about 4-7 rounds per minute and can carry up to 41 projectiles inside the tank. The gun barrel is fitted with a bore evacuator and has a thermal sleeve. The TR-85 tanks use a manual loader. The modernized version has a number of improvements to increase the reliability of the gun. The hydraulic buffer was improved by replacing the rubber sealing and the electroerosion of the chrome layer from the hydraulic buffer and recuperator has been removed by changing the design and manufacturing process.

The gun can fire APFSDS-T (BM-421 Sg), shaped charge (BK-412R and BK-5M), high explosive (OF-412), armour piercing with tracer (ballistic-capped BR-412B and BR-412D) and target practice (PBR-412 and PBR-421B) rounds. There was also an APFSDS round that is no longer in production. To increase the firepower of the TR-85 tank, the BM-421 Sg round (known internationally as the M309 cartridge) was developed in cooperation with Israel as part of the modernizing program begun in 1996. Made by Aeroteh SA from Bucharest and marketed by ROMARM SA, the BM-421 Sg projectile can penetrate 444 mm of RHAe at 90° at 500 meters, 425 mm at 1000 meters and 328 mm at 4000 meters.

==== Secondary armament ====
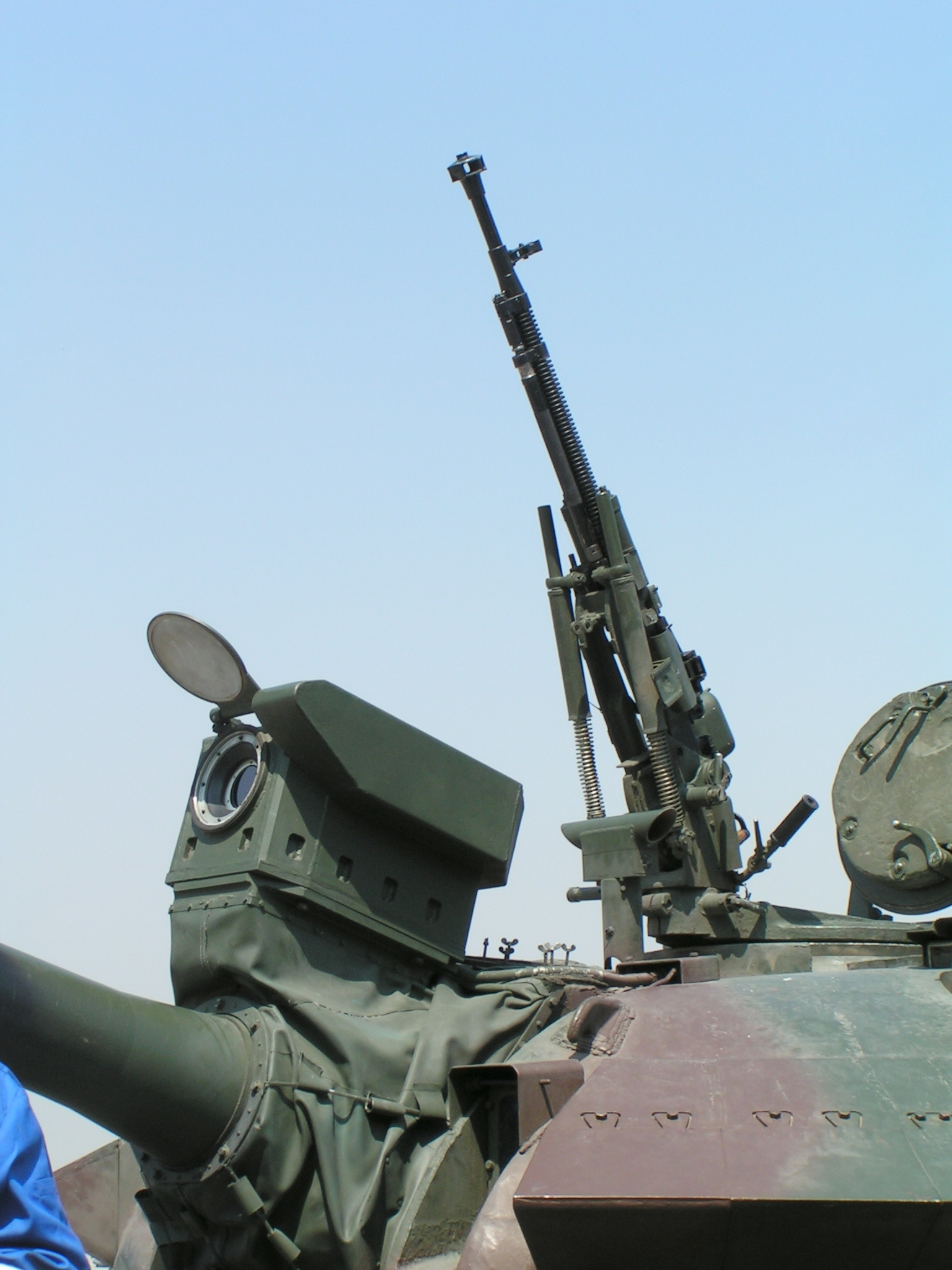
The 12.7 mm DShKM machine gun and the MATIS thermal camera (above the gun barrel)

The TR-85M1 tank has two machine guns:

1. A 12.7×108mm DShKM heavy machine gun in a pintle mount on the loader's hatch ring. The DShK machine gun is made by UM Cugir and can be used as a light antiaircraft weapon. To fire and reload the weapon manually, the gunner has to partially expose himself to suppressive fire.
2. A 7.62×54mmR PKM machine gun (also made by UM Cugir as the armoured vehicle machine gun version of the md. 66 machine gun) in a coaxial mount to the right of the main gun. The coaxial MG is aimed and fired with the same fire control system (Ciclop) used for the main gun.

==== Aiming ====
The TR-85M1 is equipped with the local-made Ciclop-M (Cyclops-M, M stands for modernized) ballistic fire-control system (FCS) computer, a third generation FCS and an improvement of the prior, second generation, Ciclop FCS (used on the TR-85 version and equipped with an Intel 8080 microprocessor, 1 ko of random-access memory (RAM) and 12 ko of system memory). According to the manual of the Ciclop-M fire control system, the ballistic solution generated ensures a hit percentage greater than 95% for a target under 2000 meters and greater than 75% for a target between 2000 and 3000 meters. Also, the Ciclop-M can be used to aim at a target located up to 6 km away with the OF-421 high explosive round, up to 5 km away for the BM-421 Sg APFSDS-T round, 4 km for the armour-piercing ammunition (AP-T) rounds and up to 3 km for the high-explosive anti-tank (HEAT) rounds. The coaxial machine gun can be aimed at a maximum distance of 2 km using the FCS of the tank.

The gun is electrically stabilized on two axes by the EADS computer aided stabilization system. The new stabilization system improves the accuracy of the main gun and reduces the target engagement time, turret temperature, noise, fire hazard and maintenance. The turret has RKS rolling-element bearings (roller bearings) to ensure better stabilising of the A308 gun. The gunner's day sight telescopic periscope features an integrated laser rangefinder (200 m to 5.000 m measurement distance) and an electronic reticle. Above the gun barrel there is a SAGEM MATIS thermal viewer designed to operate at wavelengths between 3 and 5 μm in the spectral band. Initially, the TR-85 M1 tanks had an inferior SAGEM ALIS thermal viewer (8-12 μm in the spectral band) for the gunner, now present in export configurations. The driver has an AONP-I passive night sight, which is also the standard night vision device for the gunner on the older TR-85 tanks. The commander has a Société Française des Instruments de Mesure (SFIM) EC2−55R panoramic sight with a second generation SAGEM image intensification system that can be independently directed to the target.

=== Mobility ===
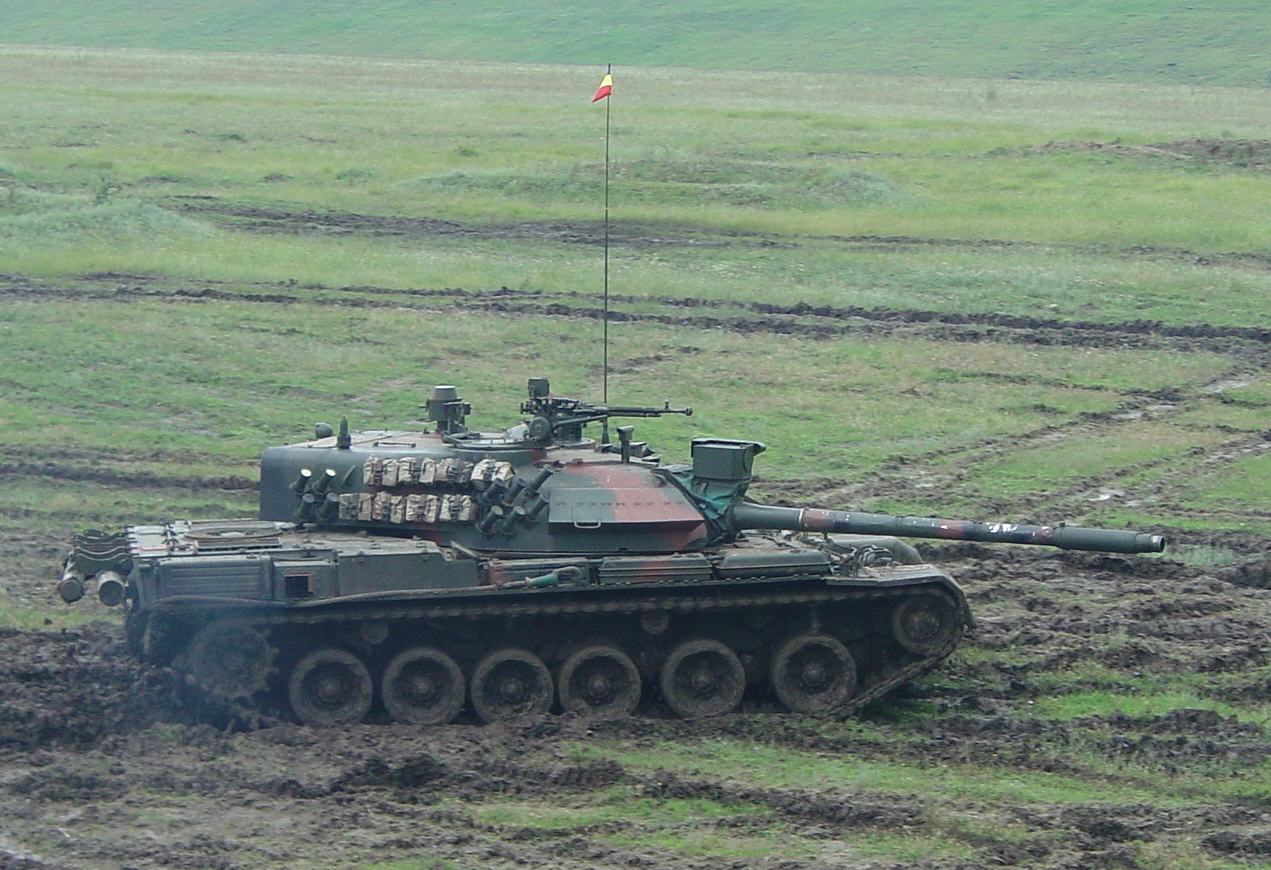
A TR-85M1 without the side skirts.

The original TR-85 was powered by the 830 horsepower 8VS-A2T2, 4 stroke, 8-cylinder, liquid-cooled, turbo charged direct injection diesel engine, and a six speed (four forward, two reverse) THM-5800 hydromechanic transmission (engaging under load, one power flow in straight run and two power flows in turns with planetary final transmission), giving it a governed top speed of 60 km/h on paved roads. The TR-85M1 has an improved version of the original engine. The new 8VS-A2T2M provides 860 horsepower and has a top road speed of 60 km/h. However, because the weight of the tank increased from 42 tons to 50 tons, the power-to-weight ratio has been reduced from 19.7 to 17.2 hp/tonne. The tank has a maximum road range of about 400 km and can be fitted with two optional 200-liter drum-type fuel tanks at the rear of the vehicle for an increased operational range. Like the T-54/55 series, the TR-85 has an unditching beam and a snorkel (to allow river crossings) mounted at the rear of the hull. To meet the power demands of the new equipment, a Kollmorgen generating set has been installed. The new power generation system provides 20 kW of stable voltage.

The TR-85 tanks have a torsion bar suspension. The modernized version also has eight telescopic hydro-gas shock-absorbers to increase the overall speed. The running gear consists of six dual rubber-tyred road wheels and four return rollers per side, with the idler wheel at the front and drive sprocket at the rear. The first two road wheels have characteristic, prominent gaps between them and the rest of the road wheels. The tank has two bolt tracks with metal-rubber articulations. The M1 version has aluminum alloy road wheels. The braking system has been improved by replacing the old wet multi-disc brakes with dry multi-disc brakes and the old hydraulic system with a new servomechanism.

=== Interior ===
The TR-85 has a typical tank layout: driver's compartment at the front, fighting compartment in the center and engine compartment in the rear. The four-man crew consists of the commander, driver, gunner and loader. The driver's hatch is on the front left of the hull roof. The commander is seated on the left side of the turret, with the gunner to his front and the loader on the right. The TR-85 has a cramped crew compartment, a trait of the T-54/55 series. Although it has an extended chassis, the extra space is used by the larger engine. The TR-85M1 also has a turret bustle, but this does not help crew comfort because of the added equipment in the modernized version. Although there are no height limits for tank recruits in the Romanian Army, the recommended maximum height is 1.68m as in practice anyone taller must sit in an uncomfortable position with limited physical movement. The communication system consists of HF and UHF transceivers with intelligent frequency hopping and encryption. The crew has an intercom with 4+1 stations.

== Variants ==
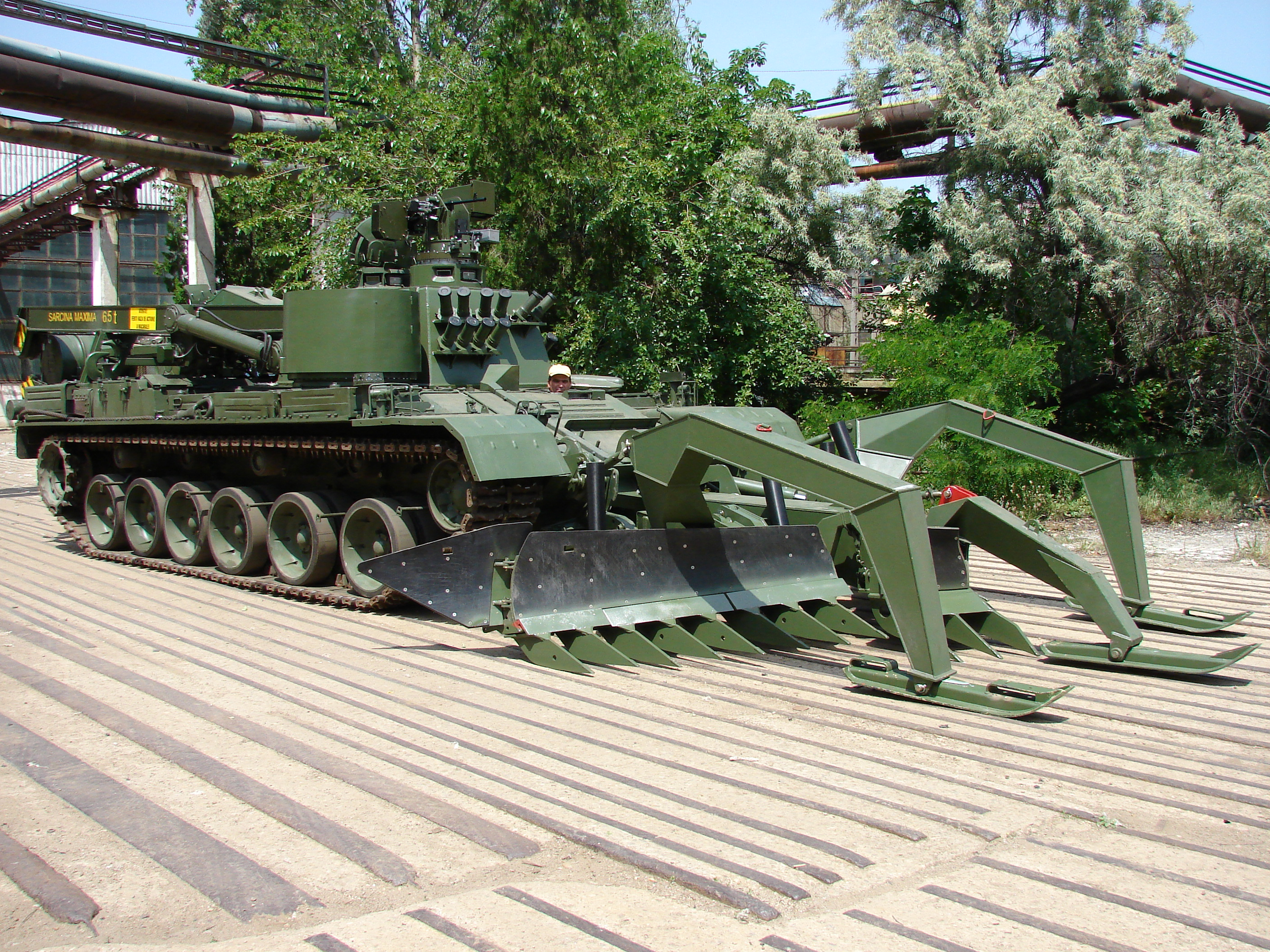
DMT-85M1 armored engineer vehicle

- TR-85-800 – first variant name.
- TR-85 – basic model, produced from 1986 until 1990.
- TER-85 – armoured recovery vehicle based on the TR-85 chassis.
- TR-85M1 "Bizonul" – modernized version, has been in service since 1997.
- DMT-85M1 – Armoured engineer vehicle based on the TR-85M1 chassis with a new, fixed superstructure, a 6.5t crane and a Pearson's TWMP mine clearing plough. The commander has a cupola with RWS. Five were built between 2007 and 2009.
- TR-85M1R – further upgraded variant presented in 2024. In total, 108 to be upgraded to TR-85M1R.

The TR-85 tank has been referred to in Western sources as the TM-800, M1978 or Model 1978 and TR-800. The Romanian Army currently uses only the TR-85 and TR-85M1 designations. However, the early prototypes of the TR-85M1 were known as the TR-85M or TR-85M1A. The add-on armour of these tanks had a different shape and was welded. Also, the turret bustle had a different shape and the bore evacuator had a different position. A TR-85M1A variant is currently on display at the National Military Museum in Bucharest.

In 2002, a TR-85M1 tank was tested with a V12 Iveco 1200 hp engine, but did not enter production. The prototype was referred to as the TR-85M2 tank in some sources, however there is no proof that the Romanian Army ever used this designation.

In 2007, when the DMT-85M1 was developed, there were also plans for other derivative vehicles based on the TR-85M1 chassis, including an armoured recovery vehicle version and an armoured vehicle-launched bridge. These variants are currently in development.

In 2024, a modernized variant designated TR-85M1R was unveiled at the Black Sea Defense & Aerospace exposition. The upgrade features new optoelectronics, new radio set, new combat system, improved gun stabilizer, additional passive armour, battle management system and rubber padded single tracks.

== Operators ==
- Romania – The Romanian Land Forces operated 249 TR-85 and 54 TR-85M1 tanks in 2014, falling to 227 TR-85 and 54 TR-85M1 tanks in 2017. The modernization program is still in progress.
- Iraq – Iraq received 150 TR-580 tanks purchased and transferred by Egypt between 1982 and 1984. The IISS estimated that Iraq had a total of 2,500 T-54/55 and TR-580 tanks in 1989.

== See also ==
- Romanian armored fighting vehicle production during World War II
- Ramses II tank – (Egypt)
- Al-Zarrar – (Pakistan)
- Type 59G(BD) Durjoy – (China, Bangladesh)
- Type-72Z Safir-74 – (Iran)
- T-55AGM – (Ukraine)
