= Type 59G Durjoy =

Main Battle Tank T-59

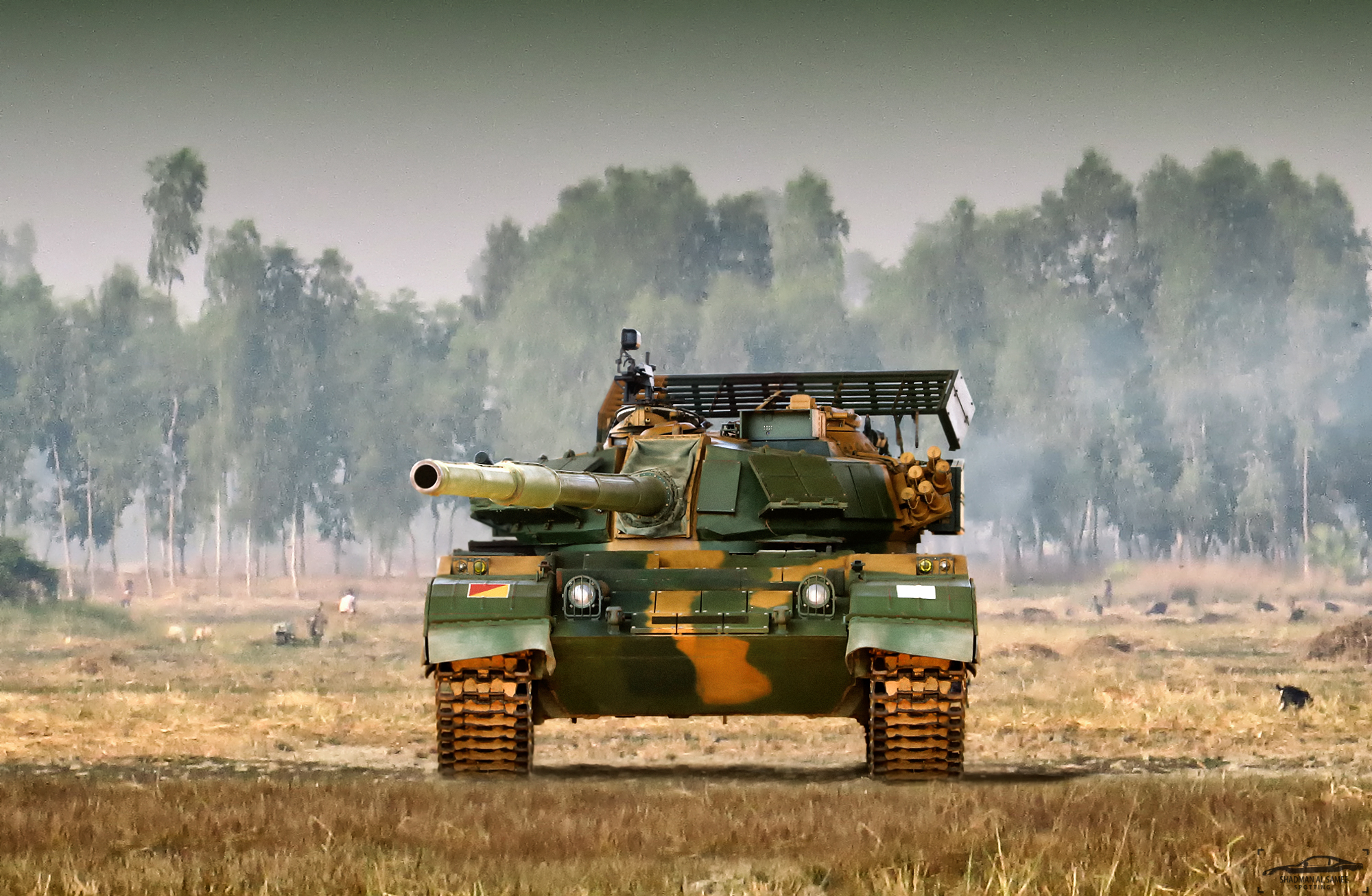
- A Durjoy tank moving off-road
- Type: Main battle tank
- Place of origin: China; Bangladesh

Service history
- In service: 2015-present
- Used by: See Operators

Production history
- Manufacturer: Norinco (manufacturer); Bangladesh Machine Tools Factory (upgrades with Chinese assistance)
- Produced: 2015-present
- No. built: ‌225

Specifications
- Mass: 42 tonnes (41 long tons; 46 short tons)
- Length: 6.04 metres (19.8 ft)
- Width: 3.27 metres (10.7 ft)
- Height: 2.59 metres (8 ft 6 in)
- Crew: 4 (commander, gunner, driver, loader/operator)
- Armor: Hull: Modular composite armour and ERA on the hull front, side skirts and ERA on the sides Turret: Modular applique armor(Same as Type 96A) and cage armour on the back of the turret
- Main armament: 125 mm smoothbore gun, capable of firing ATGMs and the APFSDS the Durjoy uses can penetrate 500 mm of RHA at 2 km
- Secondary armament: 1 × W85 12.7 mm heavy machine gun 1 x Type 86 7.62 mm coaxial machine gun
- Engine: diesel 730 horsepower (540 kW)
- Power/weight: 17.4 hp/t
- Suspension: Torsion bar
- Operational range: 450 kilometres (280 mi)
- Maximum speed: 49 kilometres per hour (30 mph)

The Type 59G Durjoy, sometimes known as Type 59G, is a highly modernized version of the Chinese Type 59 tank for the Bangladesh Army. The Bangladesh Army's old Type 59 tanks were upgraded similarly to Type 59G standard at 902 Central Workshop of the Bangladesh Machine Tools Factory with Chinese assistance.

The MBT is known as Durjoy in Bengali (Bengali: দুর্জয়, romanized: Invincible).

== History ==
The Bangladeshi Army required armoured vehicles with limited weight but good protection, firepower and speed. Between the 1980s and the early 2000s, the army had hundreds of Type 59 tanks which stayed in service until 2015. The Bangladesh Army decided to upgrade all the remaining functional tanks because the rebuilding process of a tank costs one third of buying a new one. In February 2018, the Type 59s were upgraded to the Type 59G.

During this process, only the hull of the original tank is used and all the other aspects are upgraded.

== Design ==
The tank uses the basic Type 59 hull which is 6.04 metres (19.8 ft) long, 3.27 metres (10.7 ft) wide and has a height of 2.59 metres (8 ft 6 in). The tank weighs 40 tonnes (39 long tons; 44 short tons) package.

The Durjoy uses a 730 horsepower (540 kW) diesel engine and has a power to weight ratio of 17.4 hp per tonnes. The maximum speed of the vehicle varies: in fact the tank can run at 49 kilometres per hour (30 mph) max. The tanks range is 450 kilometres (280 mi). It is equipped with rubber padded tracks to navigate softer soils and swamps. The tank has five road wheels on each side with a prominent gap between the first and second road wheel. The track is driven by a drive sprocket at the rear, with an idler at the front. Also there are return rollers which was not present on the original type-59. The suspension is a torsion bar system. The engine exhaust is on the left fender.

The Durjoy tanks require a crew of 4 people which includes commander, driver, gunner and loader. Unlike the basic Type 59, the Durjoy has an air conditioning system to increase crew comfort and complete NBC protection.

=== Protection ===
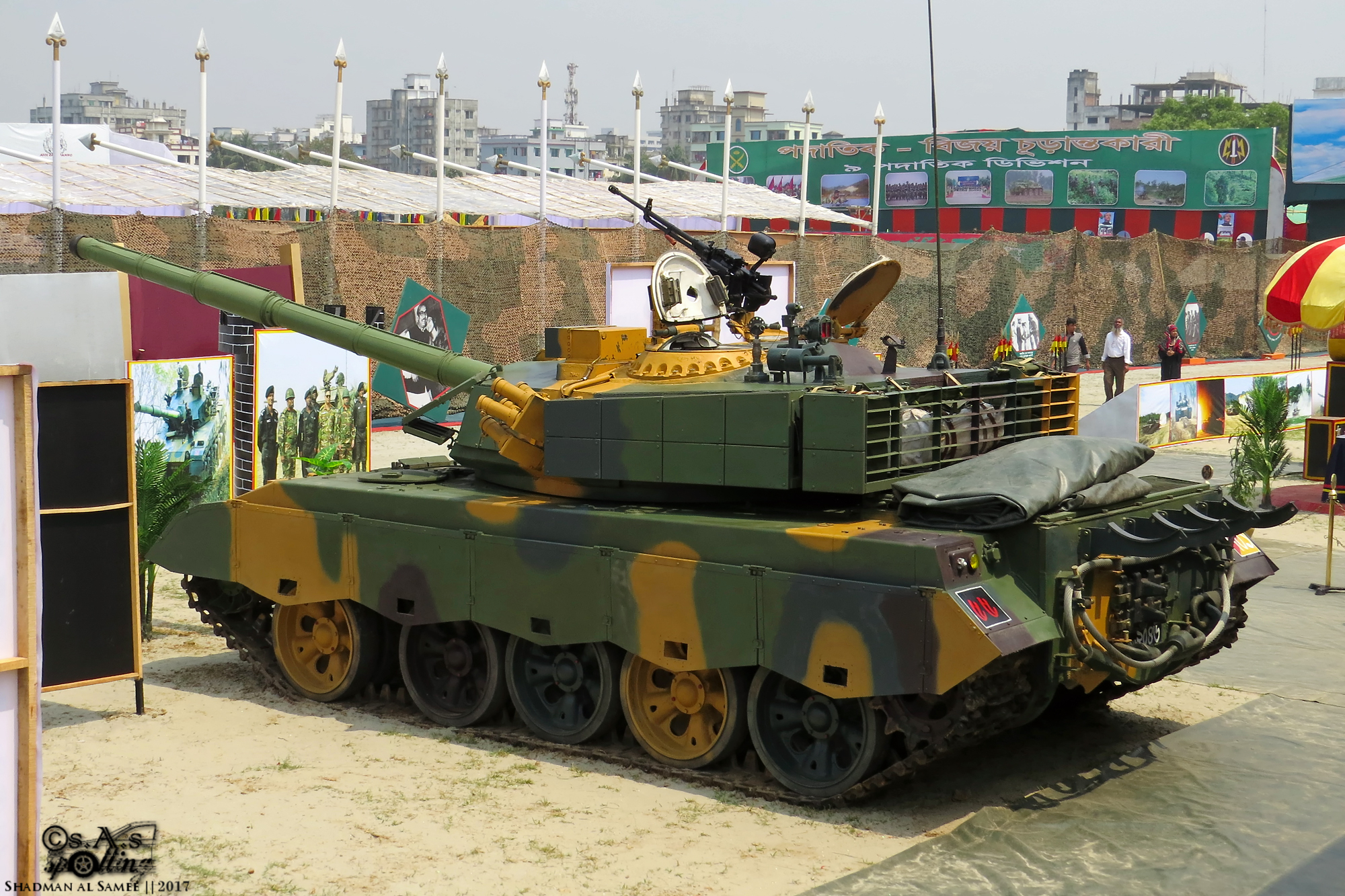
Side view of Durjoy MBT

The primary protection system of the tank is made of a layer of thick steel modular composite armour. To increase protection against APFSDS, HEAT and ATGM rounds, there is Chinese 3rd generation explosive reactive armour on the tank's front and turret. Besides, there is cage armour at the back of the turret to increase the protection level. Smoke grenade launchers are fitted to each side of the turret. A collective fire suppression system is added to increase the crew survivability rate. The tanks are equipped with a laser warning receiver to give a warning when it's targeted by an enemy laser range-finder or laser designator.

=== Armaments ===
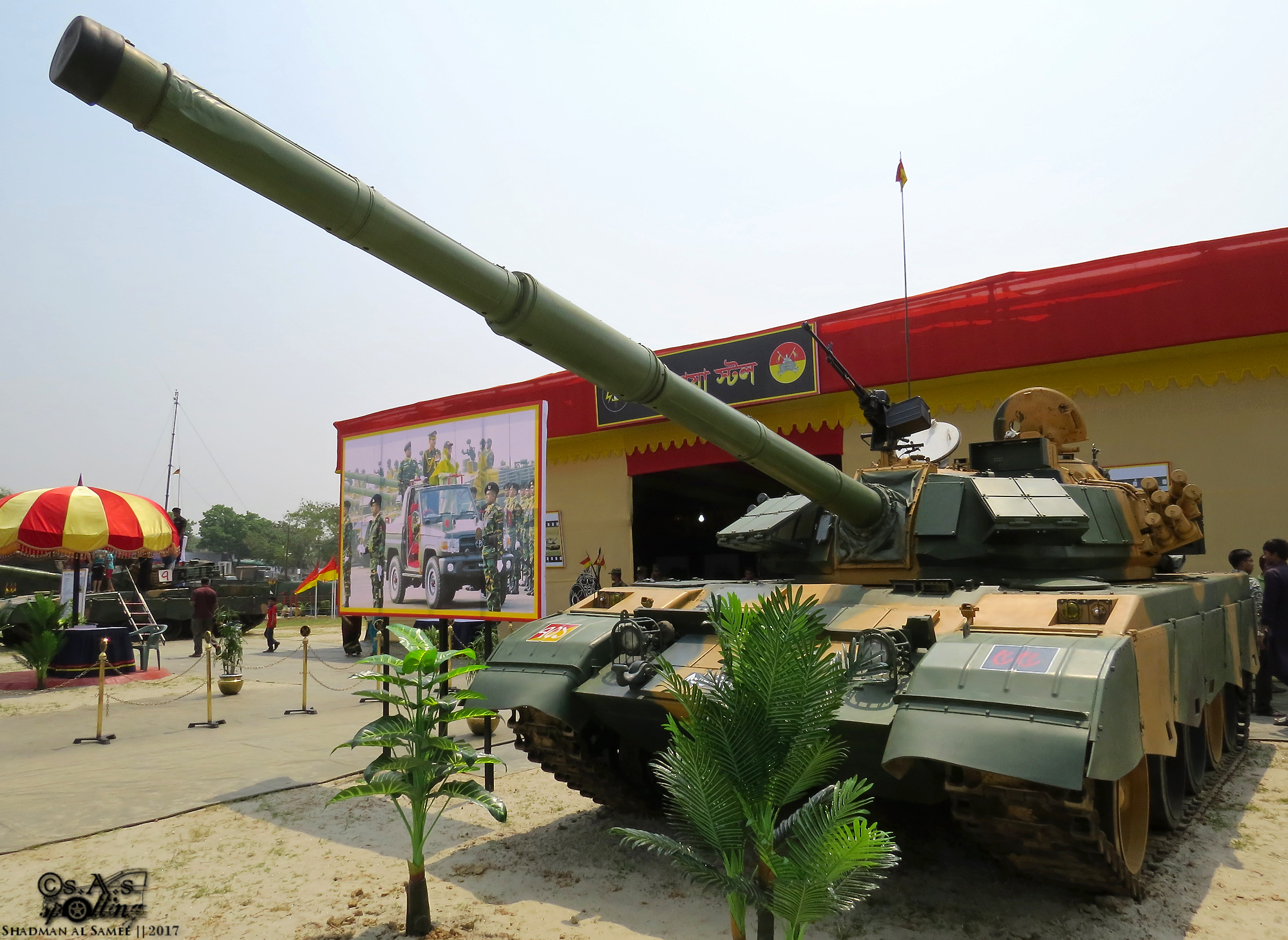
125 mm main gun of Type 59 Durjoy

The Durjoy tank has a 125 mm smoothbore gun which is the tank's primary weapon. The gun has a dual-axis gun stabilizer which enables the tank to fire at a target while the tank is moving. This gun is capable of firing APFSDS, HEAT and HE rounds as well as anti-tank guided missiles. The APFSDS used by Durjoy tank can penetrate 500mm RHA armor as far as 2 km away.

As a secondary armament, it has a 12.7 mm W85 heavy machine gun with 3000 rounds and a 7.62 mm Type 86 coaxial machine gun with 550-600 rounds. The 12.7 mm machine gun can be used in an anti-aircraft role too. It also has 81mm smoke grenades.

=== Electronics ===
The Durjoy uses a modern fire-control system comparable to the fourth generation Chinese tanks. Its ballistic computer has an integrated thermal imaging system and laser designator. It also has an independent commander's sight.

The Durjoy has a night vision system and Global Positioning System (GPS) navigation. Unlike a basic Type 59 tank, these tanks have a combat data link which gives them better situational awareness. This tank uses XDZ-1 SATCOM and VRC-2000L radio contact systems for communication.

== Operators ==
- Bangladesh: Bangladesh Army with 174 Type 59Gs.
- Chad: 30 Type-59Gs in service as of 2021.
- Tanzania: 15 Type-59Gs in service as of 2023.

== See also ==
Comparable tanks

- Al-Zarrar – (Pakistan)
- CM11 – (Taiwan)
- CM12 – (Taiwan)
- Leopard C2 – (Germany)
- T-54/T-55 – (Soviet Union)
- M60-2000 – (United States)
- M60 Sabra – (United States, Israel, Turkey)
- Magach – (United States)
- Ramses II MBT – (Egypt)
- Sho't – (Israel)
- TR-85M1 – (Romania)
- Type 72Z – (Iran)
- Mobarez tank – (Iran)
- Centurion (tank) – (United Kingdom)
- PT-91 Twardy – (Poland)
- T-55AGM – (Ukraine)
- T-72M4CZ – (Czech Republic)
- Tanque Argentino Mediano – (Argentina)
- Tifon 2a – (Peru, Ukraine)
- Zulfiqar – (Iran)

Related developments

- Type 59
- T-54/T-55
- Type 69II G
