= Ramses II tank =

Ramses II
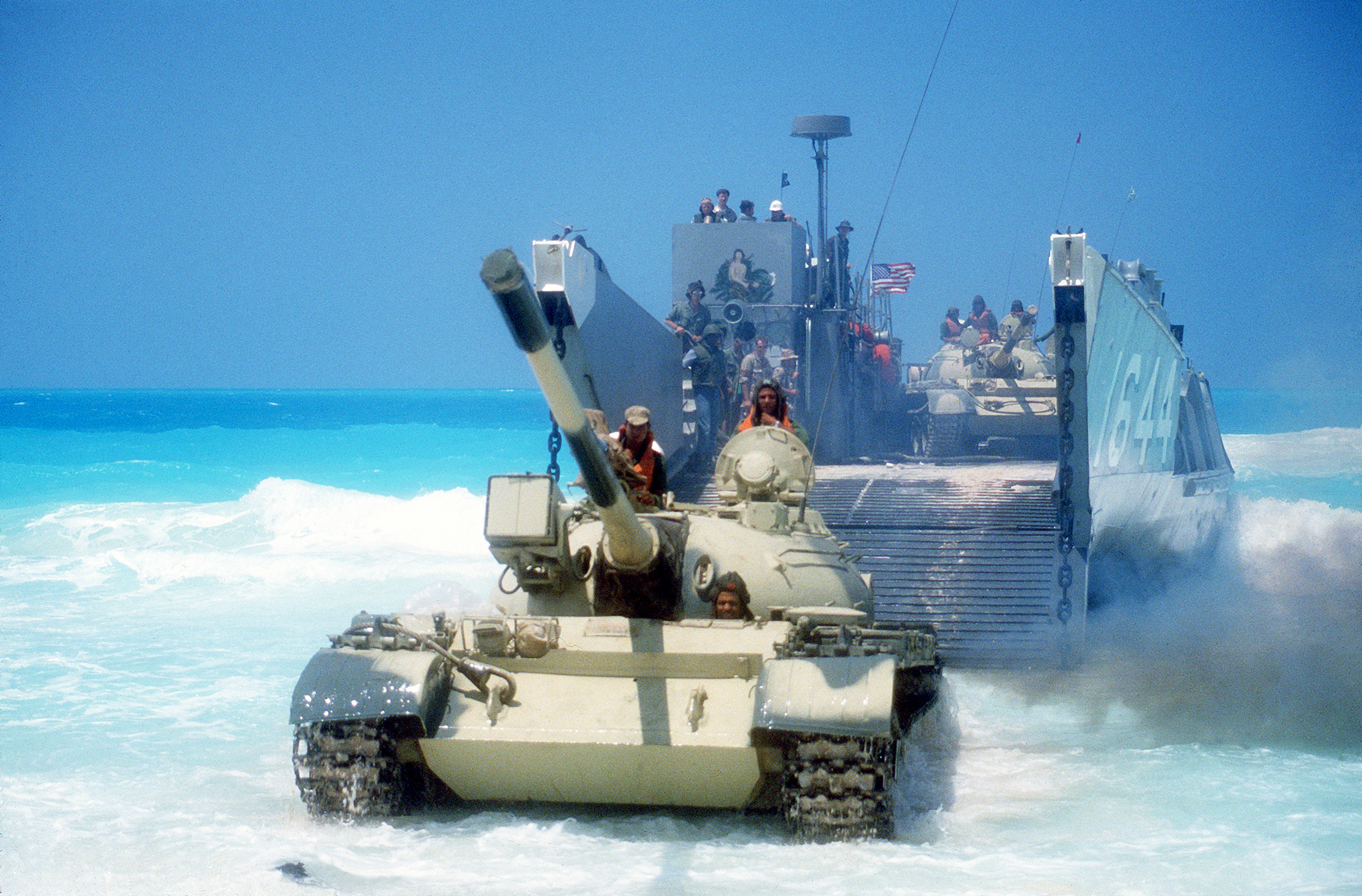
- A modified T-55 during the Operation Bright Star in 1985.
- Type: Main battle tank
- Place of origin: Egypt

Service history
- In service: 1993−2015? (Note: According to Foss, in early 2011 the Ramses II still didn't entered production and all T-54/55 tanks in Egyptian inventories were stored in reserve.)
- Used by: Egypt

Production history
- Designer: Teledyne Continental Motors
- Designed: 1984
- No. built: 260? (Note: According to Foss, only one prototype was built, and as of early 2011 no tanks were built or upgraded to the Ramses II standard for the Egyptian Army.)

Specifications
- Main armament: 105 mm M68 tank gun
- Engine: TCM AVDS-1790-5A turbo-diesel 908 bhp (677 kW)
- Transmission: Renk RK-304
- Suspension: TCM Model 2880 in-arm hydropneumatic

The Ramses II tank is a heavily modernized T-55 main battle tank designed for and used by the Egyptian Armed Forces. A single T-54 was sent to the United States for upgrading. A primary prototype was sent to Egypt where extensive trials were completed in late 1987. Additional tests were conducted in 1990. Sources are often contradictory on the Ramses II tank service history and number of vehicles built, with some stating that it entered service in relatively small numbers, (Note: In 2015, the International Institute for Strategic Studies estimated that Egypt had 1,130 M1A1 Abrams, 300 M60A1, 850 M60A3, and 260 Ramses II tanks in active service while 850 T-54/55, and 500 T-62 tanks were in storage.) while according to another source the tank never got past the prototype stage.

== Background ==
After the Soviet Union exported large numbers of T-54 and T-55 tanks for several Middle Eastern countries, other countries saw an opportunity to offer comprehensive upgrade packages. In the 1970s West Germany upgraded several hundred T-54/55 tanks for the Egyptian Army, fitting them with AEG-Telefunken white/infrared searchlights and some with Iskra laser rangerfinders. These tanks were designated as the T-55E (Egyptian) Mark 0. (Note: According to Foss, the Ramses II was originally designated as the T-55E.) The Egyptians sought to further modernize them with American and West German assistance, but most of these projects were abandoned, leading to allegations that the T-54/55 modernization program was a corruption scheme led by senior officials and the funds needed to upgrade the tanks were never available in the first place. (Note: Tucker-Jones states that the Ramses II upgrade was delayed for years, only entering service in 2005, a statement that is contradicted by Foss.)

== Design ==
The Ramses II featured a modified rear hull to accommodate a new powerpack consisting of a TCM AVDS-1790-5A turbocharged diesel engine developing 908 brake horsepower (677 kW) (similar to the M60A3 tank engine) coupled to a Renk RK-304 transmission. The Ramses II had two exhaust pipes instead of the single of exhaust of the T-54. The original suspension was replaced with Model 2880 in-arm hydropneumatic units linked to M48 road wheels, idler at the front, large drive sprocket at the rear, two new track-return rolllers and US pattern tracks replacing the original Soviet tracks.

A SABCA Titan Mk1 laser fire-control system was fitted, featuring a modified Avimo TL10-T sight incorporating the laser rangefinder and an integrated in-eye-piece CRT alphanumeric graphic display, an original SABCA double digital processor, a night vision periscope with image intensification, automatic altitude and atmospheric sensors. Gun and turret stabilizers were provided by Cadillac Gage Textron. Other modifications included a fire detection and suppression system, new final drives, new fuel tanks, new air filtration system, British Blair Catton tracks, new communication system, and a new turret basket.

The original 100 mm DT-10T gun was replaced by the 105 mm M68 tank gun, though the original breech was retained and modified and the recoil system was also modified. Smoke grenade dischargers were also mounted on both sides of the turret and an NBC protection system was also provided to the crew.

== Development and history ==
In November 1984, Teledyne Continental Motors was awarded a contract to improve firepower and mobility of a single T-54 tank. The Ramses II prototype was sent to Egypt for trials in January 1987 and these were completed by late 1987. In late 1989 Egypt signed a contract with TCM to provide support for additional tests, which were conducted in the summer of 1990.

Sources on the service history and production of the Ramses II are often contradictory, with the International Institute for Strategic Studies (IISS) stating that 260 T-54/55 tanks (out of 1,040) were in the process of upgrading in 1991, and that the Ramses II remained in active service from 1993 until 2015. The IISS also states that the retired tanks were kept in storage until 2018. Tucker-Jones states that the Ramses II only entered service in 2005, despite being largely obsolete with Egypt being gifted M60 tanks and started building the M1A1 Abrams during the early 1990s. According to former Janes editor Christopher F Foss, the Egyptians began phasing out their T-54/55 tanks after receiving 700 M60A1 tanks from the US free of charge (except for the shipping costs) between 1990 and 1992. Foss also states that as of early 2011 no tanks were upgraded to the Ramses II standard for the Egyptian Army.

== See also ==
- Main battle tank
- Egyptian Army

=== Related developments ===
- T-54
- T-55

=== Comparable vehicles ===
- Al-Zarrar – (Pakistan)
- M60-2000 MBT – (United States)
- Sabra MBT – (United States, Israel, Turkey)
- Tiam MBT – (Iran)
- TR-85 – (Romania)
- Type 59G(BD) Durjoy – (China, Bangladesh)
- Type-69IIG – (China)
- Type 72Z/Safir-74 – (Iran)

=== Related lists ===
- List of armoured fighting vehicles by country

== Bibliography ==
- Foss, Christopher F, ed. (1994). Jane's Armour and Artillery: 1994-95 (15th ed.). Jane's Information Group. ISBN 978-0-7106-1154-3.
- Foss, Christopher F, ed. (2011). Jane's Armour and Artillery 2011-2012 (32nd ed.). Jane's Information Group. ISBN 978-0-7106-2960-9.
- International Institute for Strategic Studies (1991). The Military Balance: 1991-1992. Brassey's. ISBN 978-0-08-041324-2.
- International Institute for Strategic Studies. The Military Balance, 1993-1994. London: Brassey's. ISBN 1-85753-038-1.
- International Institute for Strategic Studies (10 February 2015). "Chapter Seven: Middle East and North Africa". The Military Balance. 115 (1). Taylor & Francis: 303–362. doi:10.1080/04597222.2015.996362. ISSN 0459-7222.
- International Institute for Strategic Studies (13 February 2018). "Chapter Seven: Middle East and North Africa". The Military Balance. 118 (1). Taylor & Francis: 315–374. doi:10.1080/04597222.2018.1416983. ISSN 0459-7222.
- Tucker-Jones, Anthony (2017). T-54/55: The Soviet Army's Cold War Main Battle Tank. Pen and Sword. ISBN 978-1-4738-9111-1.
