= Al-Zarrar tank =

Pakistani Main battle tank

Al-Zarrar
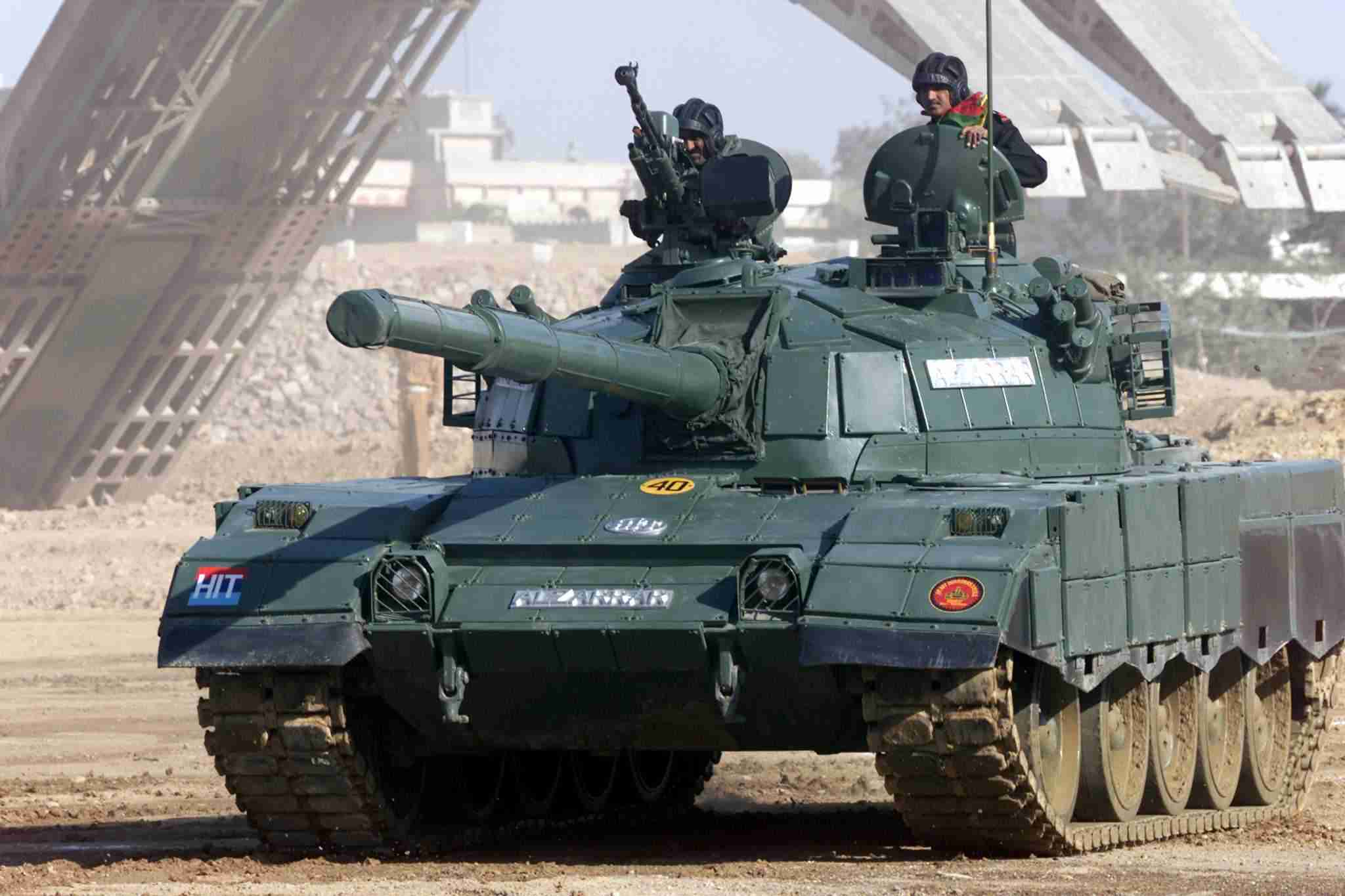
- Al-Zarrar MBT during the Pakistan Military Parade.
- Type: Main battle tank
- Place of origin: Pakistan

Service history
- In service: 2004–present
- Used by: Pakistan Army
- Wars: War in North-West Pakistan

Production history
- Designer: Heavy Industries Taxila
- Designed: 1990s
- Manufacturer: Heavy Industries Taxila
- Produced: 6 May 2003
- Variants: None

Specifications
- Mass: 44 t (97,000 lb)
- Length: 31.17 ft (9.50 m)
- Width: 10.83 ft (3.30 m)
- Height: 8.20 ft (2.50 m)
- Crew: 4
- Shell: 125mm smoothbore
- Calibre: 125 mm
- Armour: Modular composite armour Explosive reactive armour
- Main armament: 125 mm smoothbore ammunition
- Secondary armament: 12.7 mm external anti-aircraft machine gun 7.62 mm coaxial machine gun 8 × smoke grade dischargers
- Engine: 1xKMDB 12 cylinder liquid cooled diesel 730 hp
- Power/weight: 18.3 hp/tonne
- Suspension: High-hardness-steel torsion bar
- Operational range: 450 km (280 mi)
- Maximum speed: 65 km (40 mi)/h

The Al-Zarrar (Urdu: الضرار), is a second generation main battle tank (MBT), currently in the services of the Pakistan Army since 2004. The tank is named after Muslim warrior Zarrar bin Al-Azwar.

It is a highly upgraded version of Pakistan's ageing Chinese Type 59 tanks (a design that in turn was based on the Soviet T-54A from the mid-1950s), developed with Ukrainian assistance and manufactured by the Heavy Industries Taxila (HIT) – the hub of Pakistani tanks and tracked vehicles, featuring a 125 mm smoothbore gun as primary weapon. The Al-Zarrar can achieve a maximum speed of 65 km (40 mi) per hour, weighs around 44 tons and has a four-man crew: commander, gunner, loader and driver.

Although the upgrade program started in 1990 the Al-Zarrar did not enter military service with the Pakistan Army Armoured Corps until 2004, gradually replacing the Type 59s. It is the most plentiful tank in Pakistan's arsenal, with over 500 units in service and an additional 600 Type-59s to be upgraded. Attempts were made to export the Al-Zarrar to the Bangladesh Army in 2008 to replace its massive fleet of Type 59 tanks through the technology transfer. However, Bangladesh Army later upgraded its Type-59 tanks to Type 59 Durjoy, Pakistan Army remained its sole operator.

== History ==
It was decided by the Pakistan Army that their inventory of Chinese origin Type 59 tanks was too large to be discarded and replaced, so a phased upgrade programme was started by Heavy Industries Taxila (HIT) in 1990. The idea was to upgrade the firepower, mobility and protection of the Type 59 to allow it to compete on the modern battlefield at a fraction of the cost of a modern main battle tank (MBT). The first phase of the upgrade programme was completed in 1997. The second phase started in 1998 when HIT began development and testing of a new tank, a Type 59 re-built with over 50 modifications, resulting in three prototypes with slightly differing specifications (different fire-control systems, for example). Many systems originally developed for HIT's Al-Khalid MBT were incorporated. The prototypes underwent extensive testing by HIT and the Pakistan Army, who selected the final version of the tank, dubbed Al-Zarrar.

By mid 2004, it was expected that 50 AL-Zarrar tanks would be exported to other countries. The Al-Zarrar is a modern MBT developed and manufactured by HIT of Pakistan for the Pakistan Army. An upgraded variant of the Chinese Type 59 tank, the Al-Zarrar is cost-effective modern replacement for the Type 59 fleet of the Pakistan Army. Equipped with modern armament, fire control and ballistic protection, the Al-Zarrar upgrade is also offered by HIT to the armies of foreign countries to upgrade their T-54/T-55 or Type 59 tanks to Al-Zarrar standard. 54 modifications made to the Type 59 make the Al-Zarrar effectively a new tank.

The Al-Zarrar development programme started in 1990. HIT began mass production of Al-Zarrar on 6 May 2003 under a renowned project manager, Engineer Mahmood Khan. The first batch of 88 Al-Zarrars were delivered to the Pakistan Army on 26 February 2004 and General Pervez Musharraf attended the delivery ceremony.

== Design ==
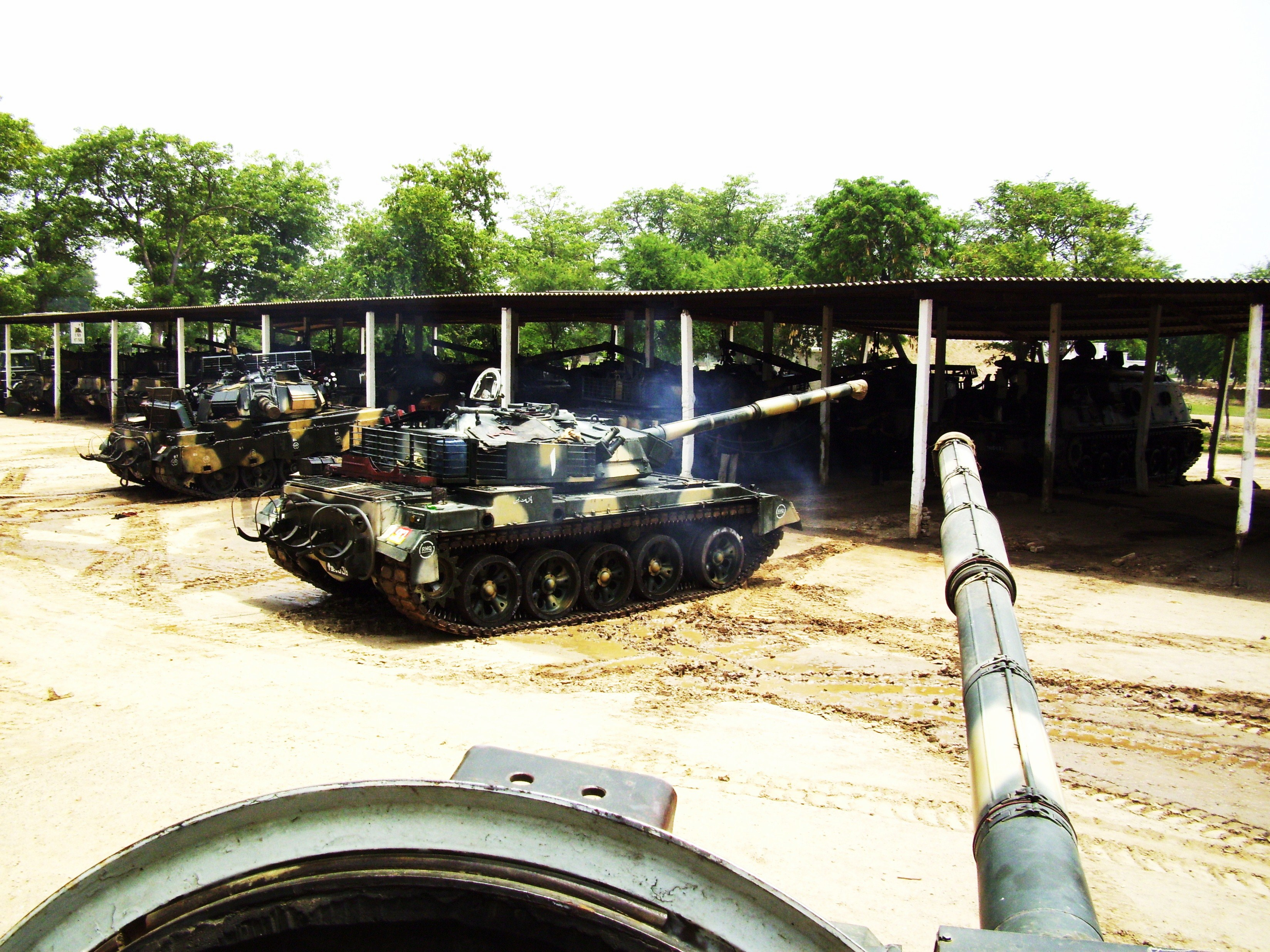
Al-Zarrar MBTs of the Pakistan Army's 27th Cavalry regiment stationed at Kharian

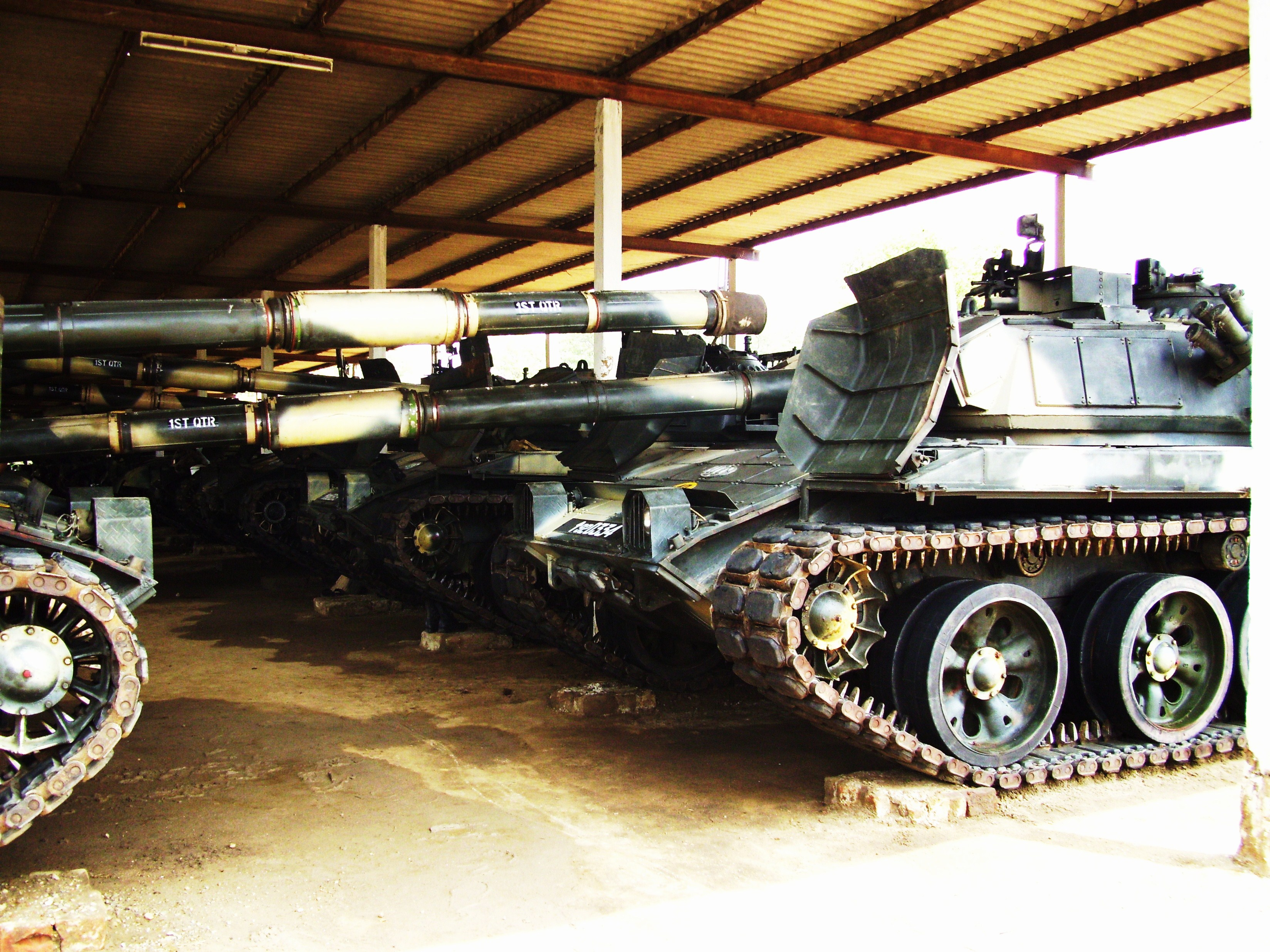
Al-Zarrar MBTs of the Pakistan Army's 27th Cavalry regiment stationed at Kharian

=== Armament and fire-control ===
Al-Zarrar's primary armament is a 125 mm smoothbore tank gun with an autofrettaged, chrome-plated gun barrel. It is a Chinese non-licensed clone of 2A46 capable of firing APFSDS, HEAT-FS and HE-FS rounds as well as anti-tank guided missiles and a Pakistani DU (depleted uranium) round, the 125 mm Naiza. Naiza is capable of penetrating 550 mm of RHA armour at a distance of 2 km. The gun has a dual-axis stabilization system and thermal imaging sights integrated into the fire-control system for the commander and gunner, giving it enhanced night-time target acquisition capabilities. The image stabilized fire-control system includes a laser range-finder for accurate range information and ballistics computer to improve accuracy. An improved gun control system is also fitted.

The secondary armament consists of an external 12.7 mm anti-aircraft machine gun mounted on the roof of the turret, which can be aimed and fired from inside the tank, and a 7.62 mm coaxial machine gun.

=== Mobility ===
The Al-Zarrar is powered by an upgraded version of the Type-59's original liquid-cooled 12-cylinder diesel engine, boosting the power output from 580 horsepower to 730 hp (540 kW) and torque output of 305 kg.m at 1300–1400 rpm. A combat weight of 40 tonnes gives Al-Zarrar a power-to-weight ratio of 18.3 hp/tonne and a top speed of 65 km/h. Crew comfort is improved over the Type 59 by a modified torsion bar suspension system.

=== Protection ===
Al-Zarrar uses modular composite armour and explosive reactive armour to give improved protection from anti-tank missiles, mines and other weapons. The Pakistani ATCOP LTS-1 laser threat warning system is fitted to inform the tank crew if the tank is targeted by a laser range-finder or laser designator. Smoke grenade launchers are fitted to the sides of the turret. An automatic fire-extinguishing and explosion suppression system is installed to improve crew survivability.

== Operators ==
=== Current operators ===
- Pakistan
  - Pakistan Army: 500 in service.

== See also ==
Related development

- Type 59

Comparable tanks

- T-72 A – (Soviet Union)
- T-55AGM – (Ukraine)
- Tifon 2a – (Peru, Ukraine)
- Type 59G(BD) Durjoy – (China, Bangladesh)
- Type 72Z – (Iran)

Related Lists

- List of armoured fighting vehicles
