= 9th Mechanized Brigade =

9th Mechanized Brigade "Mărășești"
- Brigada 9 Mecanizată "Mărășești"
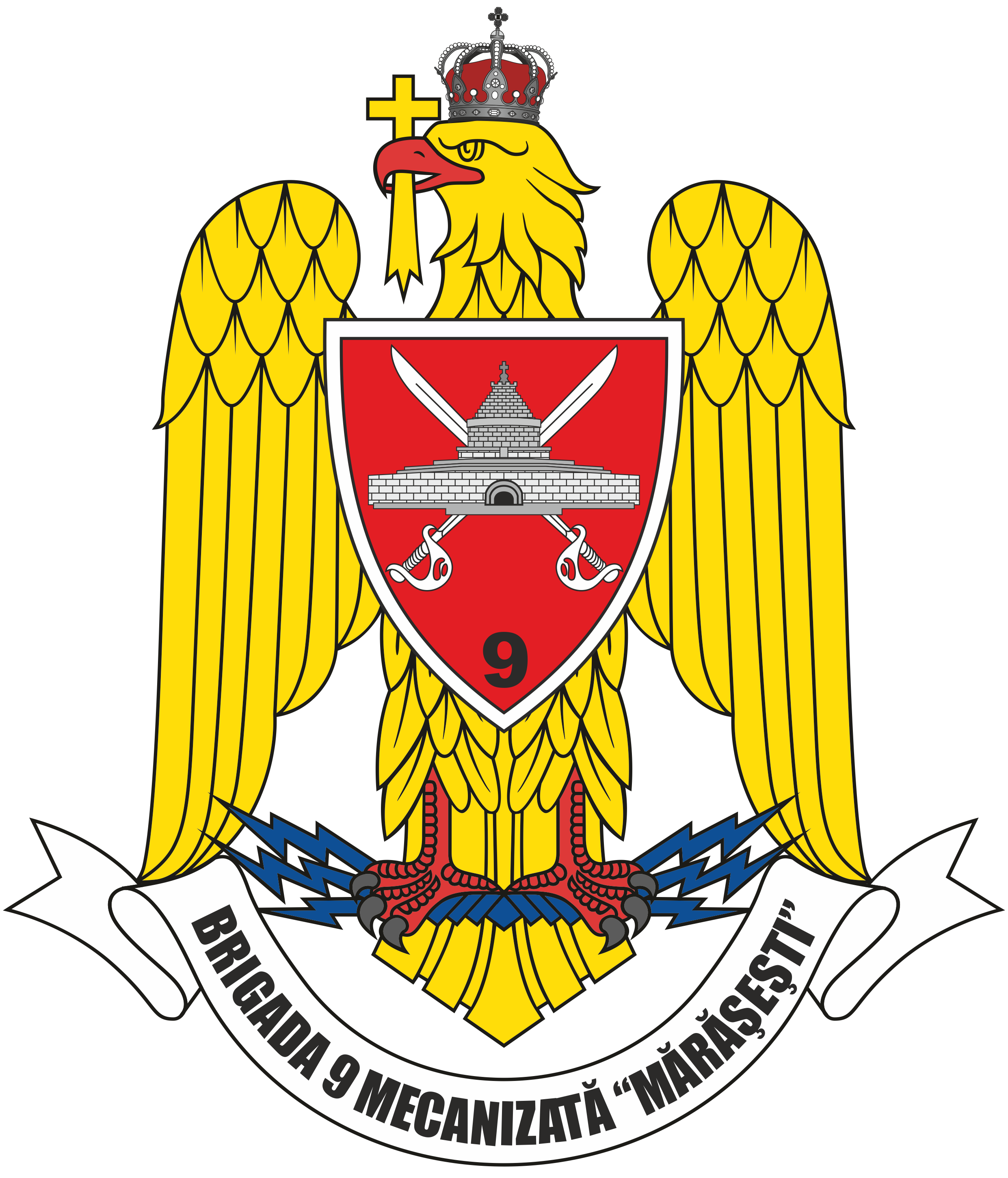
- Insignia of the 9th Mechanized Brigade "Mărășești"
- Active: 22 February 1879-present
- Country: Romania
- Branch: Romanian Land Forces
- Type: Mechanized Infantry
- Size: 7 battalions + other supporting companies
- Part of: 2nd Infantry Division "Getica"
- Garrison/HQ: Constanța
- Nickname: "Mărășești"
- Engagements: Battle of Mărășești; Battle of Stalingrad

Commanders
- Current commander: Colonel Constantin George Ileana Niță

The 9th Mechanized Brigade "Mărășești" (Brigada 9 Mecanizată "Mărășești") is a mechanized infantry brigade of the Romanian Land Forces.

== History ==
The unit was initially formed in 1879, after the Romanian War of Independence, as Divizia Activă de Dobrogea (Dobruja Active Division). In 1903 it was renamed to 9th Infantry Division, designation under which it participated in both world wars. In World War I it fought during the Battle of Mărășești where it defended the most difficult sector, being under constant attacks for two weeks. For its heroic actions in this battle, the 9th Infantry Division received the honorific name "Mărășești". In World War II, the division fought on both the Eastern Front, where it took part in the Battle of Stalingrad, and on the Western Front, participating in the liberation of Hungary and Czechoslovakia.

After World War II, the division went through some changes becoming the IXth Army Corps and eventually the 9th Mechanized Division before being deactivated. Vasile Milea commanded the division in 1957-58.

In 2004 the 34th Territorial Mechanized "Vasile Lupu" brigade was moved from the Mihail Kogălniceanu garrison, reorganizing into the 34th Light Infantry Brigade "Vasile Lupu" (Brigada 34 Infanterie Ușoară "Vasile Lupu") headquartered at Clinceni which later became the 1st Mechanized Brigade "Argedava". The land formerly occupied by the headquarters of the 34th Mechanized was given to the United States Army for a new base near the Mihail Kogălniceanu airport. In accordance with the transformation strategy of the Romanian Army, the Dobrujan unit was reactivated on 1 October 2009 as 9th Mechanized Brigade "Mărășești", taking over control of all units in Dobruja from the former 34th Mechanized Brigade; two new subunits were also created at this time: the 911th Infantry and 912th Tank Battalion, the latter equipped with T-55 tanks and Flakpanzer Gepard. The 9th Mechanized Brigade is part of SEEBRIG.

== Organization ==
- 9th Mechanized Brigade "Mărășești", in Constanța
  - 114th Tank Battalion "Petru Cercel", in Târgoviște, with TR-85 main battle tanks
  - 912th Tank Battalion "Scythia Minor", in Murfatlar, with TR-85 main battle tanks
  - 341st Infantry Battalion "Constanța", in Topraisar
  - 911th Infantry Battalion "Capidava", in Medgidia, with Otokar Cobra II
  - 345th Artillery Battalion "Tomis", in Medgidia
  - 348th Anti-aircraft Defence Battalion "Dobrogea", in Murfatlar, with Flakpanzer Gepard and KP-SAM Chiron
  - 168th Logistic Support Battalion "Pontus Euxinus", in Constanța
  - 349th Reconnaissance Company
  - 353rd Combat Engineer Company
  - 919th Communications and Information Technology Company
  - 921st Military Police Company
  - CBRN Defence Company
  - Support Company

=== 341st Infantry Battalion ===
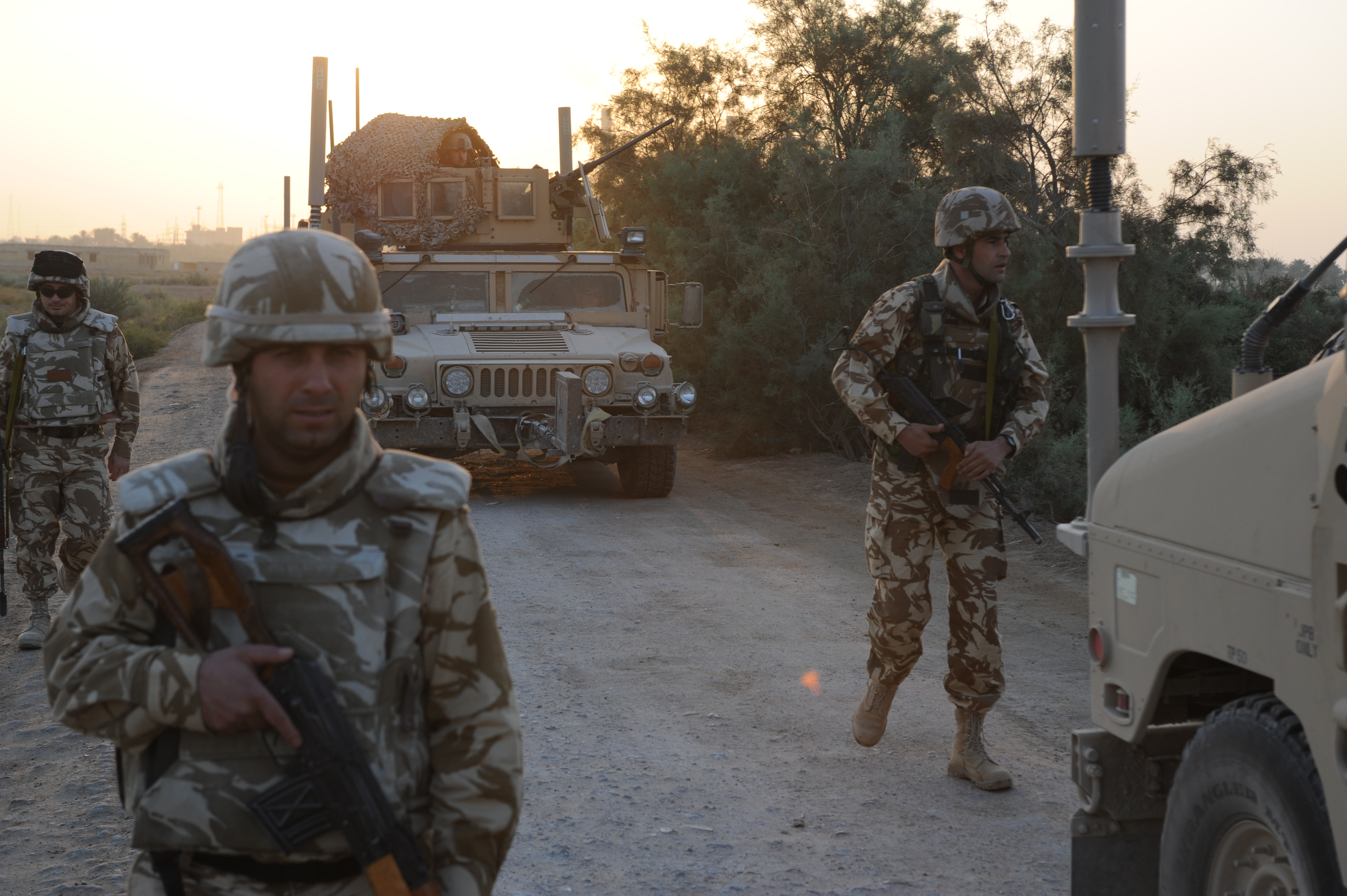
The White Sharks patrolling in Iraq.

The 341st Infantry Battalion, nicknamed "White Sharks", is the most experienced unit of the new brigade, with numerous international deployments, including Kosovo, Afghanistan, and Iraq. After the 34th Mechanized Brigade "Vasile Lupu" was reorganized in 2004 as the Light Infantry Brigade, the White Sharks were the component battalion that maintained the highest readiness, and the only large military unit based in Dobruja.

== Decorations ==
The 9th Mechanized Brigade has received the following decorations:

- Order of Military Virtue, Peacetime (Knight – 2017; Officer – 2024)
