= 61st Anti-aircraft Missiles Regiment (Romania) =

Unit of the Romanian Land Forces

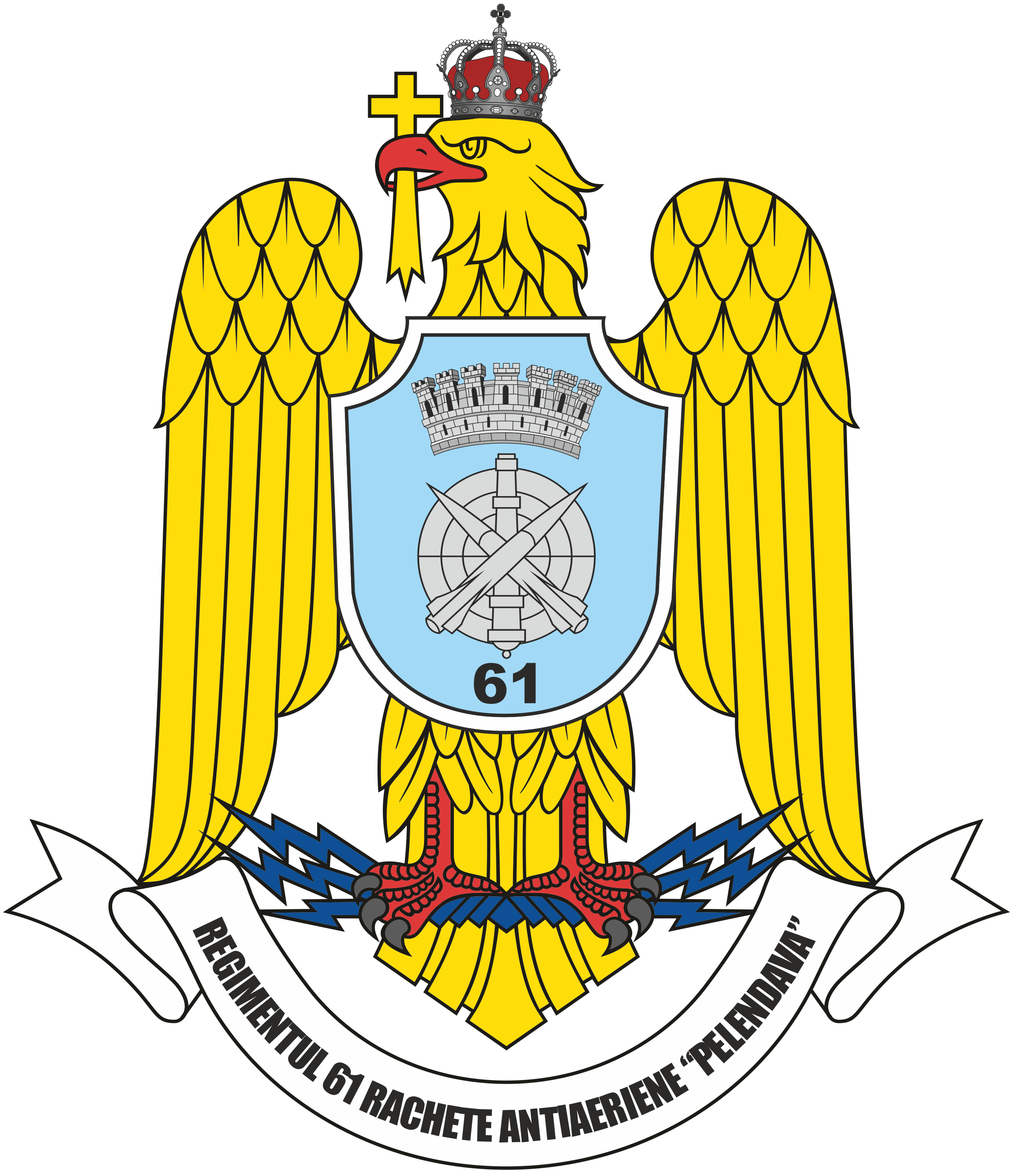
Insignia of the 61st Anti-aircraft Missiles Regiment

The 61st Anti-aircraft Missiles Regiment "Pelendava" (Regimentul 61 Rachete Antiaeriene) is an air defence regiment of the Romanian Land Forces. It was formed on 30 June 1982 and its headquarters are located in Craiova, Dolj County.

The regiment was part of the 6th Anti-aircraft Missile Brigade, which was disbanded in 2006, due to a reorganization process of the Romanian Land Forces. Later on, it was part of the 53rd Anti-Aircraft Missiles Regiment subordinated to the 1st Infantry Division. This unit operated the 2K12 Kub tracked surface-to-air systems and currently operates the MIM-23 HAWK, KP-SAM Chiron systems and will be equipped with two Oerlikon C-RAM systems.

The main units of the regiment were the 1st Anti-aircraft Missiles Battalion and the 2nd Anti-aircraft Missiles Battalion Pelendava. When Romania's divisions were reorganized and the 2nd Infantry Division was created from units previously belonging to the 1st and 2nd divisions, the Pelendava Battalion was raised to a regiment and kept with the 1st Division, while the 1st Anti-aircraft Missiles Battalion was transferred to the 2nd Division.

== Decorations ==
The 61st Anti-Aircraft Missile Regiment has received the following decorations:

- Order of Military Virtue, Peacetime (Knight – 2016)
