= 2nd Infantry Division (Romania) =

2nd Infantry Division "Getica"
- Divizia 2 Infanterie "Getica"
- Heraldic emblem of the 2nd Infantry Division
- Active: 2010 – present
- Country: Romania
- Branch: Romanian Land Forces
- Size: 3 brigades, 4 regiments, 1 logistics base, 1 EOD group and 5 auxiliary battalions
- Garrison/HQ: Buzău

Commanders
- Current commander: Major General Gabriel-Constantin Turculeț

Insignia
- Color SSI

- Subdued SSI

The 2nd Infantry Division Getica is one of the major units of the Romanian Land Forces. The 2nd Infantry Division is the heraldic successor of the Second Army. It was active during the Cold War with its headquarters first in Bucharest, and after 1980, in Buzău.

== Structure ==
2nd Infantry Division "Getica" organization as of October 2026 (click to enlarge)

- 2nd Infantry Division "Getica", in Buzău
  - 9th Mechanized Brigade "Mărășești", in Constanța
  - 15th Mechanized Brigade "Podu Înalt", in Iași
  - 282nd Armored Brigade "Unirea Principatelor", in Focșani
  - 3rd Logistics Base "Zargidava", in Roman
  - 47th Communication and Informatics Battalion (CIS) "General Nicolae Petrescu", in Buzău
  - 52nd Artillery Regiment "General Alexandru Tell", in Bârlad
  - 53rd Anti-aircraft Missile Regiment "Tropaeum Traiani", in Medgidia
  - 61st Anti-aircraft Missile Regiment "Pelendava", in Craiova
  - 113th Anti-Tank Artillery Battalion "Bărăganul", in Slobozia
  - 528th Intelligence, Surveillance and Reconnaissance (ISR) Regiment "Vlad Țepeș", in Brăila
  - 3rd Engineer Battalion "General Constantin Poenaru", in Mărăcineni
  - 4th Explosive Ordnance Disposal (EOD) Group, in Mărăcineni
  - 200th Support Battalion "Istrița", in Buzău
  - 202nd CBRN Battalion "General Gheorghe Teleman", in Huși

== Decorations ==
The 2nd Infantry Division has received the following decorations:

- National Order of Faithful Service, Peacetime (Knight – 2017; Officer – 2021)
- National Order of Merit, Peacetime (Officer – 2016; Commander – 2024)
