= Tifon 2a =

T-55 derived tank from Peru/Ukraine

Typhoon-2A
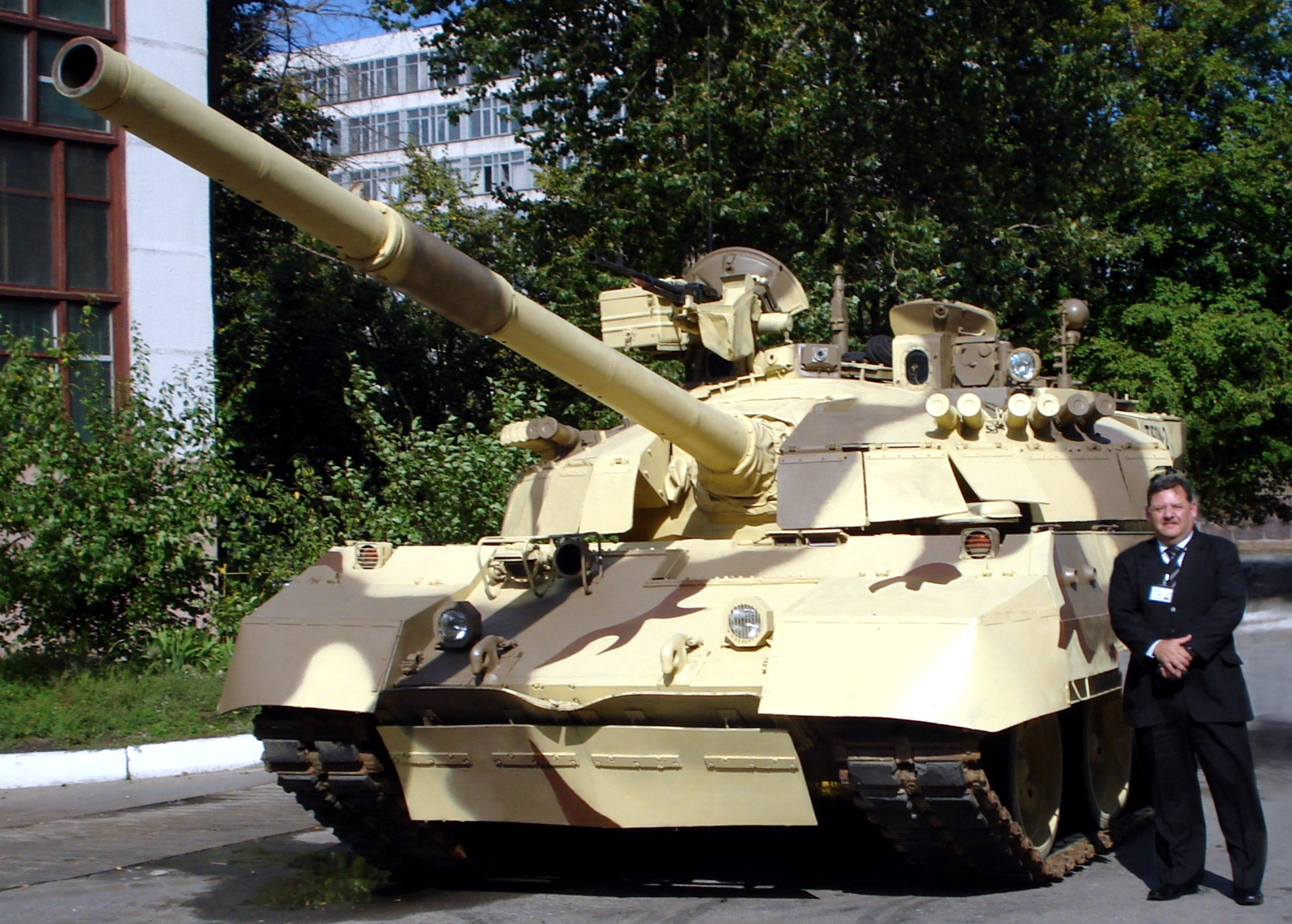
- Tank Tifon-2A (Typhoon-2A) with its creator, Sergio Casanave
- Type: Main battle tank
- Place of origin: Peru / Ukraine

Service history
- In service: 2010 - present
- Used by: Peru (Trials/Development only to date)

Production history
- Designer: Sergio Casanave
- Designed: 2009
- Manufacturer: Diseños Casanave Corporation; KMDB
- Unit cost: $2.0 M
- Produced: 2010-present
- No. built: 4
- Variants: 3

Specifications
- Mass: 46 tons
- Length: 6.45 m
- Width: 3.37 m
- Height: 2.40 m
- Crew: 3 (commander, gunner, driver)
- Armor: ERA "NOZH", "DEFLEKT"
- Main armament: Smooth-Bore 125 mm KBM-1M (48 Caliber); APFSDS, HEAT, HE-FRAG, Misil KOMBAT
- Secondary armament: 12.7×108mm remote-controlled anti-air KT-12.7 (3,000 rounds)
- Engine: 5TDMFA 1,000 cc 5-cylinder boxer flat Flex-fuel; 1,050 hp (895 kW)
- Power/weight: 26.7 hp/t
- Transmission: 5-speed automatic
- Suspension: torsion beam suspension
- Maximum speed: 75 km/h

The Typhoon-2A is a main battle tank developed and manufactured jointly by the Peruvian company DICSAC (Diseños Casanave Corporation S.A.C. of Peru) and the Kharkiv Morozov Machine Building Design Bureau of Ukraine. The Tifon (Typhoon)-2A is based on the Soviet T-54/55 tank. The tank is a 3-man machine with day and night technology and a thermal vision Buran device with 12 km range.

== Development ==
The Typhoon-2A project was designed by Sergio Casanave Quelopana, a Peruvian Engineer, to help the Peruvian Army keep up with modern tank designs. The design was built around the Peruvian T-55 using feedback from the Peruvian military, and available components in European tank designs. The engineers decided to use the experience of successful modern tank designs, such as the Russian T-90 and the French Leclerc. This was achieved by developing the Typhoon-2A through the Kharkiv Morozov Machine Building Design Bureau. The Typhoon-2A is the product of a series of modifications and modernisations of the T-55 AGM.

== Features ==
=== Armament ===
The Typhoon-2A is primarily armed with an auto-loaded 125 mm smooth-bore KBM-1M 48 caliber gun capable of 8 rpm. It can fire APFSDS-T rounds, tandem-charge HEAT rounds, and HE-FRAG rounds with an effective range of up to 3,000 m. It also carries Kombat anti-tank guided missiles with an effective range exceeding 5,000m and is capable of targeting ground targets and helicopters flying at low altitudes. The secondary armament is a remotely controlled 12.7×108mm KT-12.7 machine gun. The Typhoon-2A may also be fitted with a co-axial 7.62×54mmR KT-7.62 machine gun. Fire control on the Typhoon-2A 2 is a ballistics computer LIO-V operated by both the gunner and the commander. The Typhoon-2A can function at night using BURAN CATHERINE-E thermal vision with a range up to 12 km.

=== Shielding and defenses ===
The Typhoon-2A features the Ceramic Shield "Deflek T," a composite of steel compound and polymer plates. This unique feature can significantly reduce the initial velocity of armor-piercing, fin-stabilized, and discarding-sabot (APFSDS) rounds, while also neutralizing high-explosive anti-tank (HEAT) charges from tanks and anti-tank guns. Additionally, the Nozh Reactive Armor is made up of explosive charges and activates when hit by projectiles over 30mm to neutralize their penetrating effects. Bringing these two features together enhances the survivability against HEAT rocket anti-tank missiles or guns, and sub-caliber (APFSDS) 120mm attacks. During field tests, it was observed that 120mm NATO APFSDS type projectiles were ineffective at 2,000m, with 120mm NATO HEAT ineffective at 3,000m, increasing its protection by more than five times over the previously used armor package. Furthermore, the tank has twelve 81mm smoke grenade launchers located on either side of the turret, controlled by the Linkey-SPZ system, creating a smokescreen around the tank.

=== Mechanics ===
The Typhoon-2A tank is equipped with a 1,050 HP 5TDFMA model engine, which is a two-stroke, turbocharged, and flexible fuel engine that can utilize kerosene, oil, diesel, jet fuel, or a mixture. The engine is a five-cylinder boxer horizontal type with an ejection system for the ventilation motor and a shutter system that enables immersion in water. The 1.8m ventilation liquid type is closed and forced and uses the high motor's exhaust gas system. The purification system uses a cyclone-type air cassette, providing a 99.8% efficiency rate. It can operate for over 500 km without cleaning the transmission box filter. The planetary system comprises two plates with six forward and three reverse changes, utilizing a mechanical-electrical system that ensures maximum speeds of up to 75 km/h going forward and 32 km/h in reverse. The Typhoon-2A features a new power steering system that includes data displayed in a digital format, such as changes in indicator, ignition, and electric pressure. The newly designed suspension and bearing system uses three rollers per side, torsion bars, and high-strength springs, allowing for speeds up to 60 to 78 km/h on roads and over 45 km/h in reverse. Additionally, the "Neoprene Pads" improve the tank's grip on the road. The tank can also mount a Navigation System (GPS) "TIUS - NM" model that is based on GLONASS and NAVSTAR systems. Finally, it also includes a location system, situated in the housing of the chief of tank that provides accurate information on the position of the tank and other vehicles in the fleet.

== See also ==
- T-54/55
- T-55AGM

=== Tanks of comparable role and era ===
- (Egypt) T-55 Ramses
- (Bangladesh) Type 59 Durjoy
