= 53rd Anti-Aircraft Missile Regiment (Romania) =

Air defense regiment of the Romanian Land Forces

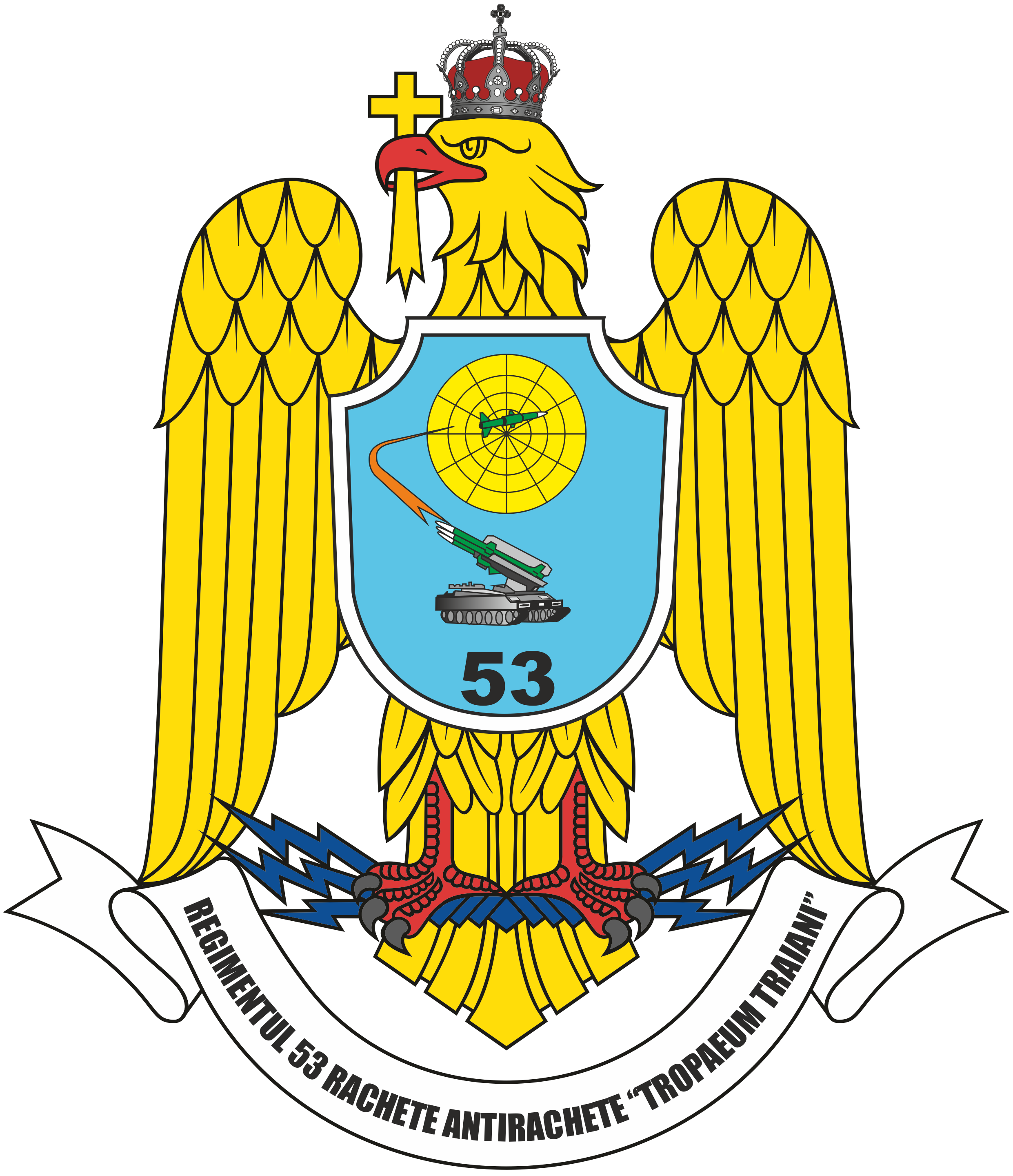
Insignia of the 53rd Anti-aircraft Missiles Regiment

The 53rd Anti-aircraft Missiles Regiment "Trophaeum Traiani" (Regimentul 53 Rachete Antiaeriene) is an air defence regiment of the Romanian Land Forces formed on 30 June 1984. It is currently subordinated to the 2nd Infantry Division and its headquarters are located in Medgidia (near Constanța). The regiment was part of the 6th Anti-aircraft Missiles Brigade, which was disbanded in 2006, due to a reorganization process of the Romanian Land Forces. The unit currently operates the MIM-23 Hawk surface-to-air missile and Merops C-UAS systems and will be equipped with Oerlikon C-RAM systems

== Decorations ==
The 50th Anti-Aircraft Missile Regiment has received the following decorations:

- Order of Military Virtue, Peacetime (Knight – 2016)
