= 6th Anti-aircraft Missiles Brigade =

6th Anti-aircraft Missiles Brigade "Râmnic" Brigada 6 Rachete Antiaeriene "Râmnic"
- Active: 1917–2005
- Country: Romania
- Branch: Romanian Land Forces
- Type: Anti-aircraft
- Size: 2 regiments + other supporting units (2005)
- Part of: 1st Territorial Army Corps
- Garrison/HQ: Râmnicu Sărat

The 6th Anti-aircraft Missiles Brigade "Râmnic" (Brigada 6 Rachete Antiaeriene) was an anti-aircraft brigade of the Romanian Land Forces. It was one of the oldest anti-aircraft military units of the Romanian Armed Forces, being formed during World War I. The brigade was subordinated in 2005 to the 1st Territorial Army Corps, and its headquarters were located in Râmnicu Sărat. The 6th Anti-aircraft Brigade was undergoing a major structural reorganization process and it was disbanded in 2006. The brigade's last commander was Brigade General Sandu Serea.

== Structure (2005) ==
- 6th Anti-aircraft Missile Operational Brigade – Râmnicu Sărat
  - 50th Mixed Anti-aircraft Missiles Regiment "Andrei Mureşianu" – Floreşti
  - 51st Anti-aircraft Missiles Regiment "Pelendava" – Craiova
  - 53rd Mixed Anti-aircraft Missiles Regiment "Trophaeum Traiani" – Medgidia
