= T-55AGM =

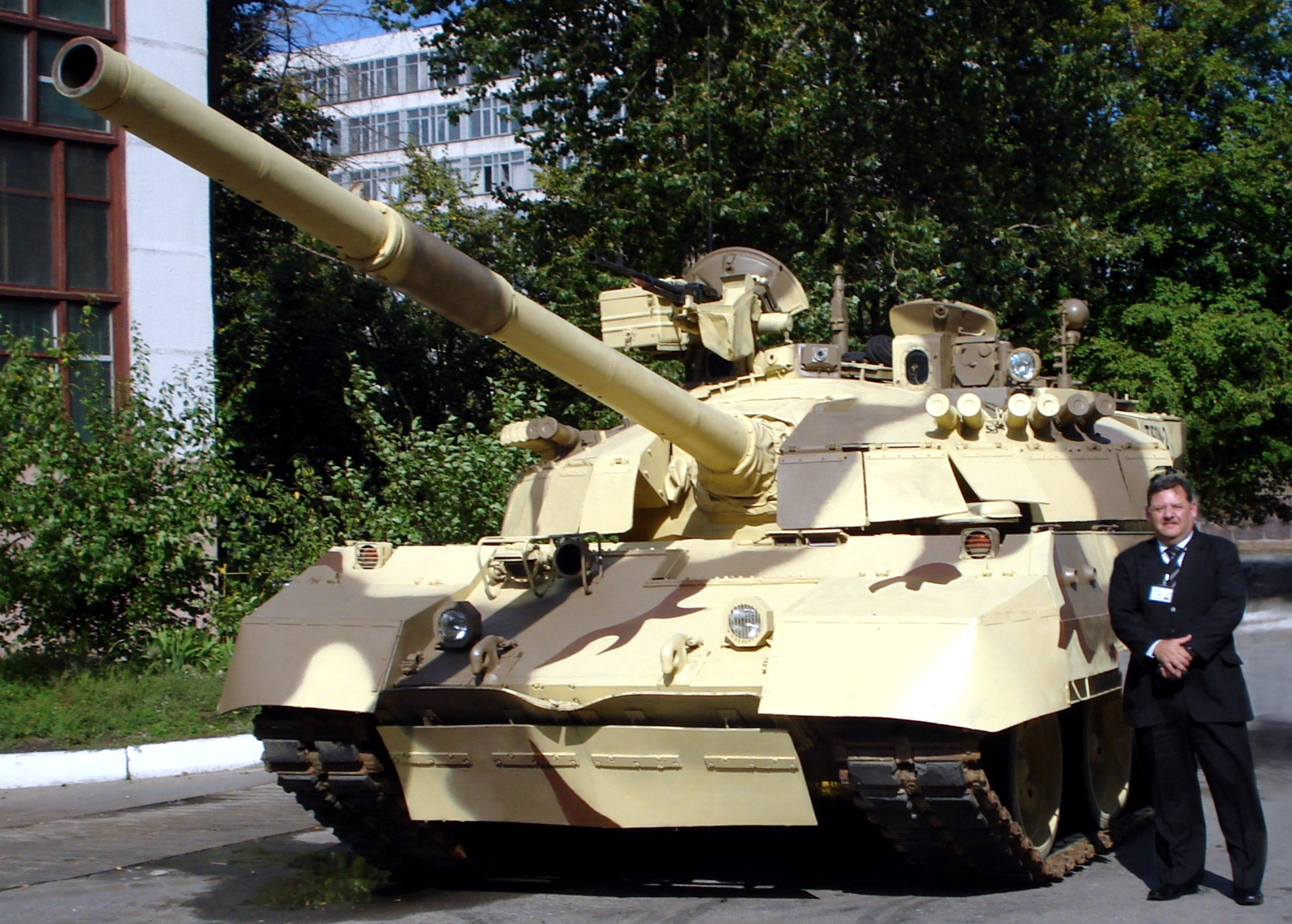
- T-55M8-A2 Tifon II, a variant of the T-55AGM
- Type: Main battle tank
- Place of origin: Ukraine

Production history
- Designer: KMDB
- Developed from: T-55

Specifications
- Mass: 46,000 kg (101,000 lb)
- Length: 9.857 m (32.34 ft)
- Width: 3.65 m (12.0 ft)
- Height: 3.004 m (9.86 ft)
- Crew: 3
- Armor: Nizh explosive reactive armour
- Main armament: 1× 125 mm (4.9 in) BKM1 or KBM2 smoothbore gun (30 rounds)
- Secondary armament: 1× coaxial PKT machine gun (3,000 rounds); 1× roof mounted NSV machine gun (450 rounds); 12× 81 mm (3.2 in) turret mounted smoke grenade launchers
- Engine: 5TDFMA V5 engine, diesel 1,000 horsepower (750 kW) at 2,600 rpm
- Power/weight: 21.7 hp/t (16.2 kW/t)
- Transmission: 7 gears (6 forward, 1 reverse)
- Suspension: Torsion bars and hydraulic shock absorbers
- Ground clearance: 0.45 m (1 ft 6 in)
- Maximum speed: 69.3 km/h (43.1 mph)

The T-55AGM is a Ukrainian modernization of the T-54/T-55 medium tank developed by the Kharkiv Morozov Machine Building Design Bureau (KMDB). Although the T-54/T-55 series are over 70 years old, a significant number of vehicles still remain in service worldwide, and after successfully working on the development of the T-80UD and T-84 tanks, KMDB turned its attention to the export market in the 2000s, and built a prototype called the T-55AGM featuring significant improvements in protection, mobility, and firepower. As of early 2011, the T-55AGM remained at the prototype stage although it has been shown outside of Ukraine.

== Description ==
The tank is fitted with a 5TDFM, two-stroke liquid-cooled multi-fuel supercharged diesel engine with opposed pistons which develops 850 horsepower (hp) (634 kW), improved running gear. The driver has an automated movement control system with a steering handlebar control.

The T-55AGM has built-in explosive reactive armour, countermeasures system, new fire suppression system with over-ride facilities at the commander's station, automatic loader which holds 18 rounds and anti-aircraft machine gun that can be aimed and fired from within the turret under a complete armour protection. The anti-aircraft machine gun is installed on the commander's cupola and can be fired at air or ground targets.

Prospective buyers can choose between two main smoothbore gun armament options: 125 mm KBM1 or 120 mm KBM2. Both of them, with use of enhanced performance conventional ammunition, or a barrel-launched anti-tank guided missile (ATGM), can defeat modern tanks from a distance of 2–3 kilometres (1.2–1.9 mi) and up to 5 kilometres (3.1 mi) using an ATGM. The tank can carry at least 30 rounds. The 125 mm KBM1 smoothbore gun weighs 2.5 tonnes, has a barrel length of 6 m (48 calibers) and can fire armour-piercing fin-stabilized discarding sabot (APFSDS), high-explosive anti-tank (HEAT), and high explosive (HE) fragmentation (HE-FRAG) rounds, while the 120 mm KBM2 smoothbore gun weighs 2.63 tonnes, has a barrel length of 6 m (50 calibers) and can fire all types of ammunition that meet the requirements of NATO standards and Ukrainian-made ATGMs. Both guns have normal recoil length of 26–30 centimetres (10–12 in) and maximum recoil length of 31 cm. The tank can be armed with either a KT-7.62 or the PKT-7.62 coaxial machine gun and can carry 3,000 rounds for it, and either a KT-12.7 or NSVT-12.7 heavy machine gun for AA protection and can carry 450 rounds for it. The approximate successful range is 2 kilometres (1.2 mi) during day and 0.8 kilometres (0.50 mi) during night. The AA HMG can be elevated between -5 and +70 degrees. The remote control for anti-aircraft machine gun is stabilized in the vertical axis during automatic mode (by using the TKN-5 sight) and is using the PZU-7 sight for semi-automatic mode.

== See also ==
- T-54/T-55 operators and variants
- T-54/T-55 – (Soviet Union)
- Tifon 2a – (Peru, Ukraine)

== Bibliography ==
- Foss, Christopher F, ed. (2011). Jane's Armour and Artillery 2011-2012 (32nd ed.). Jane's Information Group. ISBN 978-0-7106-2960-9.
