= Type 72Z =

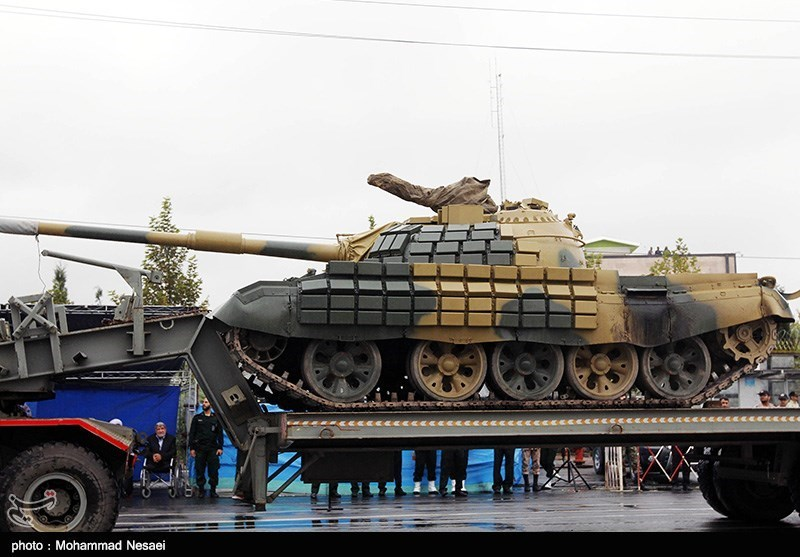
- Safir-74 with a DShK mounted on top (covered) during a military parade.
- Type: Main battle tank
- Place of origin: Iran

Service history
- Used by: See Operators
- Wars: Sudanese civil war (2023–present)

Production history
- Manufacturer: Defense Industries Organization (Iran); Military Industry Corporation
- Produced: 1996–present
- No. built: about 400
- Variants: See Variants

Specifications
- Mass: 36 tonnes
- Length: 6.45m
- Width: 3.37m
- Height: 2.40m
- Crew: 3-4
- Armor: 203 mm front of the turret 150 mm sides of the turret 64 mm rear of the turret 39 mm top of the turret 97 mm upper front of the hull 99 mm lower front of the hull 79 mm upper sides of the hull 20 mm lower sides of the hull 46 mm rear of the hull 20 mm floor of the hull fitted with ERA
- Main armament: 105mm M68 rifled tank gun
- Secondary armament: 7.62mm coaxial PKT and roof-mounted 12.7mm DShKM machine guns
- Engine: V-46-6 V-12 diesel 780 hp (630 kW)
- Power/weight: 21.66hp/tonne
- Suspension: Torsion bar
- Operational range: 440 km
- Maximum speed: 65 km/h

The Type 72Z (also known as the T-72Z and the Safir-74, and the Al-Zubair I in Sudan) is a highly modernized version of the Type 59 and T-54/T-55 tanks with upgrades carried out by the Iranian Defense Industries Organization.

The tank is not to be confused with an Iraqi modernization also known as T-72Z, said to carry a 125 mm gun.

== History ==
The Type 72Z was first announced in 1996; the tank was first produced in the same year. The upgrades to the Type 59 and T-54/T-55 tanks were carried out by the Vehicle Industries Group of the Defence Industries Organization, in order to extend the service life of tanks already in use with the Iranian army.

Around 400 are in service.

== Upgrades ==
The 100mm gun of the T-55/Type 59 was replaced with an Iranian-produced derivative of the 105mm M68 gun, capable of firing 9M117 Bastion anti-tank guided missiles as well as NATO standard ammunition. Its co-axial and anti-aircraft machine guns are retained. The Slovenian Fotona Electronic Fire Control System (EFCS-3-55) was added, with automatic and manual gun stabilizers, a laser rangefinder, second-generation night sights, a ballistic computer, and an independent viewer and target designation system for the commander.

Electric smoke grenade dischargers were also added to provide concealment on top of the existing ability to create a smoke screen by injecting diesel fuel into the left exhaust outlet. Explosive reactive armor (ERA) developed by the Shahid Kolah Dooz Industrial Complex can be fitted to the Type 72Z, providing protection against projectiles and napalm-type weapons. Side track skirts similar to those on the Type 59 were added to T-54/T-55 tanks upgraded with ERA.

The engine was replaced with a Ukrainian 780 hp V46-6 diesel engine, together with the SPAT-1200 transmission system. Air conditioning, power steering and a fire suppression system are also believed to have been installed.

The upgrades installed on the T-55s/Type 59s would increase their survivability in the battlefield.

== Variants ==
- Safir-74 - Iranian T-54/T-55 tanks which have gone through similar upgrades. Safir means "messenger" in Persian. A mine-clearing variant was reported to be in use in Sudan.
- Al-Zubair I - Sudanese variant of the Type 72Z manufactured by the Military Industry Corporation, with the engine upgraded with a supercharger.

== Operators ==
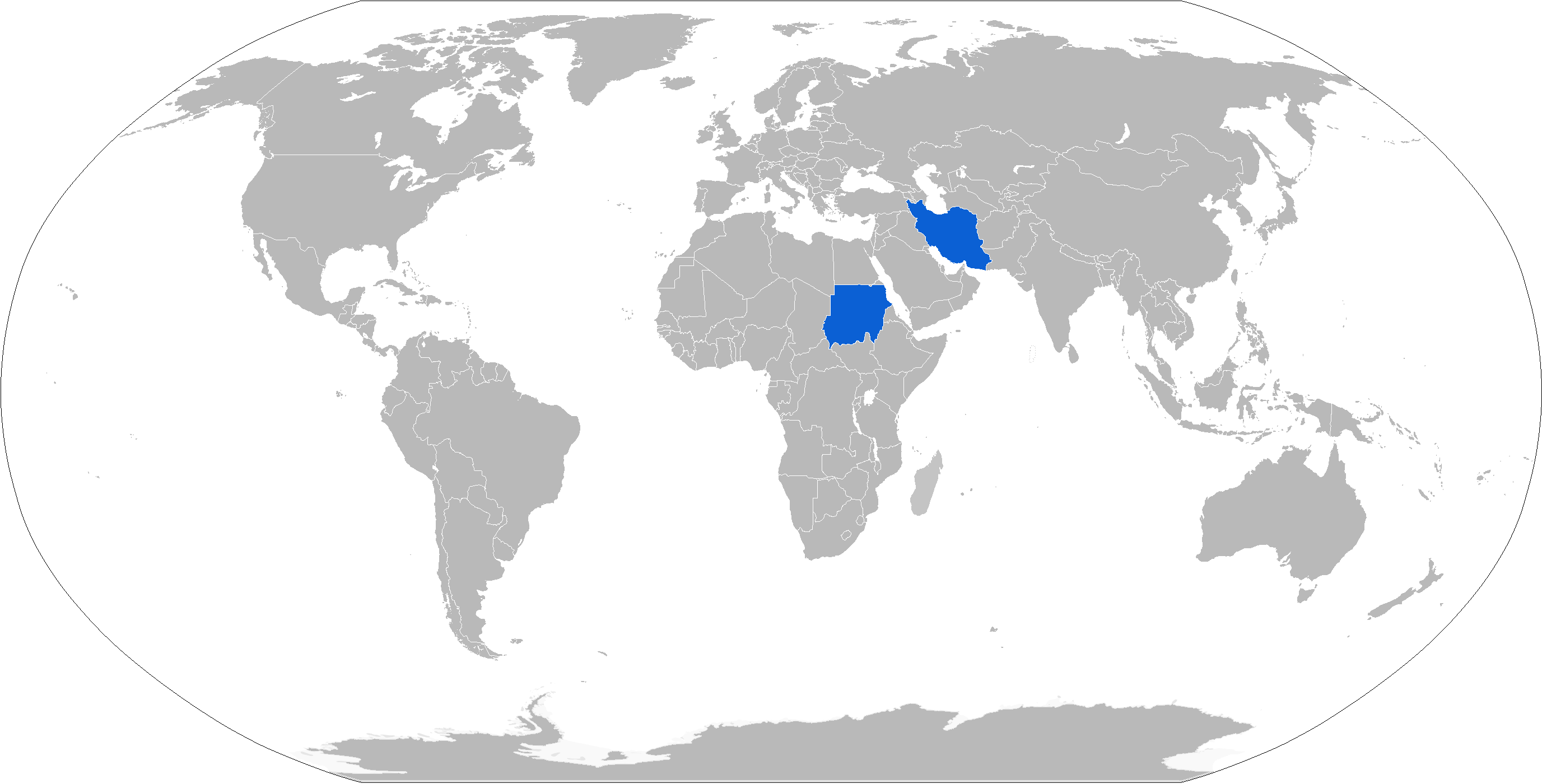
Map of Type 72Z operators in blue

- Iran
  - Ground Forces of the Islamic Revolutionary Guard Corps
  - Islamic Republic of Iran Army Ground Forces
- Sudan: First purchased in 2006.
