= Operation Bøllebank =

1994 Bosnian War confrontation

Coordinates: 44°28′22″N 18°50′49″E

- Part of the Bosnian War
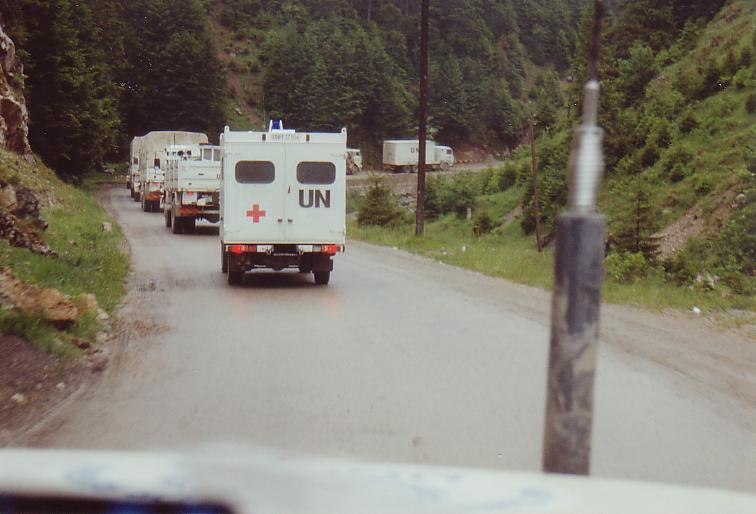
- UN convoy near Tuzla during the Bosnian War in 1994
Date	29 April 1994
Location	Near Tuzla, Bosnia and Herzegovina
Result	UNPROFOR victory; UN forces repulses Bosnian Serb ambush

Belligerents
UNPROFOR; Denmark; Sweden; Norway	Republika Srpska

Commanders and leaders
Colonel Christer Svensson NORDBAT2-CO; Lt. Colonel Lars R. Møller NORDBAT2-CoS; Major Carsten Rasmussen Sqn-CO	Unknown

Units involved
Jutland Dragoon Regiment; Swedish regiment NORDBAT 2	(Republika Srpska (1992–1995)) East Bosnia Corps

Strength
7 Leopard 1 A5 tanks (1st & 2nd platoon plus squ leader); 1 APC PBV302 (Btn HQ post); 3 Leopard 1 A5 in reserve (3rd platoon)	3 T-55 tanks Anti-tank missiles Several artillery pieces

Casualties and losses
1 tank damaged	Between 9 (Serb sources) and 150 (other sources) soldiers killed, with a similar amount of injured Ammunition store destroyed Three T-55 tanks disabled

Operation Bøllebank (English: Operation Bully Bashing) was a military confrontation between Bosnian Serb military forces and Danish, Norwegian, and Swedish combat units composing the United Nations Protection Force's (UNPROFOR) Nordic Battalion (NORDBAT 2), outside of the city of Tuzla on 29 April 1994.

When trying to relieve Swedish forces at the Tango 2 observation post past the village of Kalesija, Danish forces of the Jydske Dragonregiment were ambushed by the Bosnian Serb Šekovići brigade. The ambush was dispersed by backup UN forces retaliating with heavy fire from Danish Leopard 1 A5 tanks in two separate firefights. While no Danish or Swedish soldiers were killed in the operation, estimates place the number of Serb deaths as high as 150.

The incident is the first time the Danish Armed Forces had carried out combat operations since the Second World War nearly fifty years prior, and is the source of ongoing debate and controversy as to the rights of UN peacekeeping forces to exert force and engage in direct combat.

== UNPROFOR in Bosnia and Herzegovina ==
Violence and civil war throughout the Balkans began in 1991 with the collapse of the federation of Yugoslav republics. From 1992, fighting spilled over into Bosnia and Herzegovina as the nation attempted to achieve independence and recognition. Hoping to lay the foundation for peace agreements and to minimise the humanitarian consequences of fighting, the UN deployed peacekeeping forces to Bosnia shortly after the onset of conflict. In 1992, shortly after the spread of war to Bosnia and Herzegovina, the United Nations Protection Force (UNPROFOR) was established and sent to the region to, amongst other tasks, forward humanitarian efforts throughout Bosnia and Herzegovina, eventually growing into a force of nearly 38,599 military personnel as of March 1995. Six UN Safe Areas were established by the Security Council throughout the country in Sarajevo, Tuzla, Srebrenica, Bihać, Goražde and Žepa in 1993 to protect civilians from the advancing Bosnian-Serb army and their violence against civilian populations during the advance.

The creation of the UN Safe Areas did, however, contribute to mounting criticism of UN peacekeeping due to engrained conceptual contradictions in their establishment. Although parties were required to treat the established areas as "safe" as per Security Council resolution, UNPROFOR troops managing and protecting the areas were given little in terms of practical means to carry out their mandates. While in principle UNPROFOR was authorised to use force in self-defence and to coordinate air support for its missions with NATO, UN leadership strategically avoided situations which allowed the peacekeepers to legitimately use force, rather expecting their mere presence to deter potential attacks and ensure the security of Safe Area inhabitants. Additionally, UNPROFOR was faced with the fundamentally contradictory task of carrying out traditional peacekeeping activities in an area with no peace to upkeep, but rather plagued by ongoing violence.

== Tuzla Safe Area ==
The advancing Bosnian-Serb army threatening to conquer the town of Srebrenica and other parts of Eastern Bosnia, as well as the number of atrocities carried out by Bosnian-Serb forces against civilian populations despite UN efforts led the Security council to establish six so-called UN Safe Areas throughout Bosnia in Sarajevo, Tuzla, Srebrenica, Bihać, Goražde and Žepa. One such Safe Area was established in Tuzla, a salt mining city 120 km from Sarajevo in the north-eastern region of Bosnia. Tuzla became a critical location due firstly to its status as a population centre in the country, with the population more than doubling in size from its pre-war population 170,000 inhabitants to over 370,000. Secondly, the strategic importance of the Tuzla Safe Area also stemmed from its proximity to the newly-established border between the Serb-controlled Republika Srpska and the Bosniak-controlled areas. Tuzla was also a strategic location in the war due to its possession of one of few large airfields in the country.

Responsibility for the protection and management of the Tuzla Safe Area was placed on NORDBAT 2, a combined force of 1,246 Danish, Norwegian and Swedish troops. As the fall of the Soviet Union had essentially left Denmark for the first time in its history without a potential military adversary, the worsening situation in the Balkans and the establishment of UNPROFOR operations in the region provided a new peacekeeping application for Danish defences.

Under this mandate, a main assignment of NORDBAT 2 was to ensure the continuing ability of the international community to provide military equipment and humanitarian aid for distribution throughout the country by protecting the large airfield just outside of Tuzla. In 1994, Lars Møller of the Danish defence forces was appointed as the second in command for the entirety of NORDBAT 2, an operation composed of units from three national militaries, as well as the commander for the Danish units. As the Danish military had already deployed a large number of troops to assist UN troops in Croatia and Bosnia, supporting UNPROFOR operations in Tuzla stood as a relatively routine and uncontroversial decision. The additional decision of the Danish Parliament on the 17 August 1993 to send 10 mid-weight Leopard 1 tanks along with troops to Tuzla was, however, highly controversial as the deployment of heavy armoured vehicles, such as the tanks, had never been done before in support of a humanitarian operation as in Tuzla.

== The incident ==
The helmet and bulletproof military vest worn by Lars R. Møller during Operation Bøllebank

The situation in Bosnia deteriorated in the beginning of 1994 as Bosnian Serb forces began launching a number of offensives against the UN Safe Area in Goražde, ultimately ended by a NATO airstrike. Conditions in the Safe Area of Tuzla reflected the general trend, and the weeks leading up to Operation Bøllebank became characterised by a notable intensification of shelling, especially directed toward the airport in Tuzla. In response to the increased shelling, the Danish squadron developed an emergency plan—Plan Bøllebank—in order to be able to quickly mobilise troops in defence of the airfield at Tuzla. Although the alarm was sounded and the plan executed several times under heavy shelling, mobilisation of troops and tanks at the Tuzla airfield never led directly to a direct firefight or confrontation.

On the night of 29 April 1994, however, alarms sounded in the Danish camp and seven out of the ten Leopard 1 A5 tanks were called into action. Accounts from several of the tank commanders tell of the tanks being mobilised and sent out without clear orders or assignment, but informed that the lives of UN personnel were at risk. It was soon relayed to the tank commanders, however, that they were to rescue the observation post TANGO 2, defended by Norwegian and Swedish troops, which had come under heavy fire by the Bosnian Serb forces they were surveilling on a nearby mountaintop.

As the column of tanks neared the village of Sarači 8 kilometres east of Tuzla, they came under heavy shelling by Bosnian Serb forces using mortars and anti-tank rockets, among other forms of artillery. While parts of the column sought shelter in Sarači, a pair of tanks was sent on in an attempt to save the TANGO 2 post. The two tanks again came under heavy artillery fire as they reached the outskirts of the village of Kalesija, the closest settlement to the observation post. Although Danish commanders requested NATO support in the form of an airstrike, these requests were ultimately denied.

The exact sequence of events which followed has been heavily disputed as official accounts of the operation have been challenged by details and alternate accounts brought forth by tank commanders and other Danish troops who took part in the operation. The disputes have primarily revolved around two crucial aspects: whether explicit orders were ever issued for the forces stationed in Sarači to assume a defensive position and to return Bosnian Serb fire, and if so, who issued those orders. According to several sources, losses on the Bosnian Serb side reached up to 150 men and an ammo depot. These numbers remain unofficial, however, as Bosnian Serb commanders officially stated that they suffered only nine losses during the incident. What is known with certainty, however, is that the Danish forces did return fire on their attackers, firing in total 72 rounds at the Bosnian Serb troops: 44 high explosive (brisance) rounds, 19 phosphorus rounds, and 19 armour-piercing rounds. Rounds struck an ammunition depot and several bunkers as well as three T-55 Bosnian Serb tanks, according to other source, causing a great deal of destruction and thwarting the ambush in an instance of what Møller describes as "the mouse who ate the cat".

== Aftermath ==
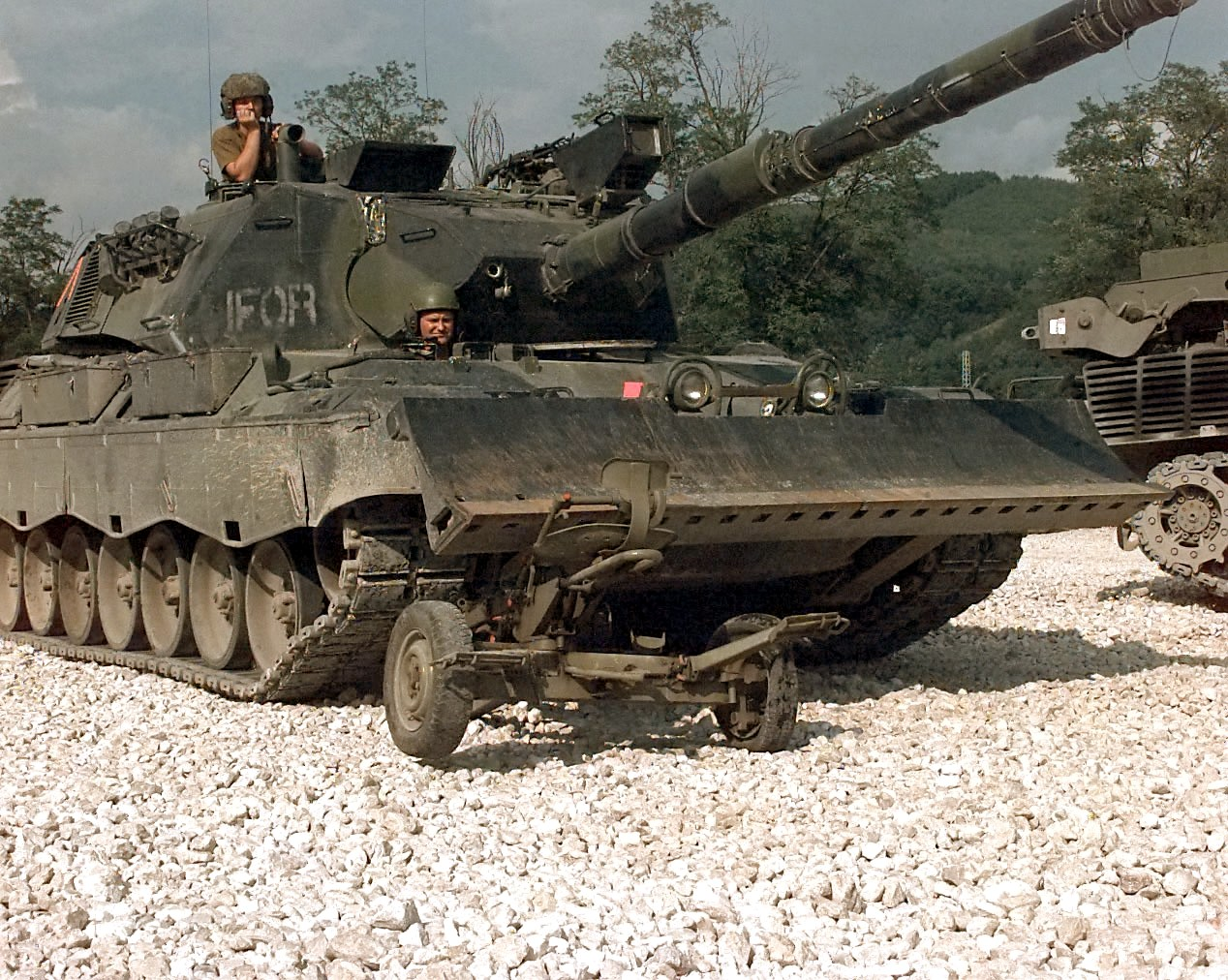
A Danish IFOR Leopard 1A5 tank crushing a Bosnian Serb 20 mm cannon in 1996

The events of Operation Bøllebank were by no means without consequences for either the Danish forces or the larger UN peacekeeping operations that they supported as a part of UNPROFOR. Criticism of the operation and its leadership, particularly the Danish leaders Lars Møller and Carsten Rasmussen, came from both UN administrators and the successive leadership of NORDBAT 2. Those in the UN who had always been skeptical of the deployment of tanks by the Danish government claimed that the mere presence of the armoured vehicles in Tuzla was a provocation and caused an increase in aggression on the Serbian side. Internally, the last commander of NORDBAT 2, Brigadier General Per Hvidberg, stationed in Tuzla from 1995 to 1996, described Møller’s use of force to be unnecessary, "provocatory" and "wrong" as it breached the strict rules of engagement set in place by the UN.

The incident elicited mixed internal responses, as resistance and scepticism toward the use of heavy artillery and tanks as components of peacekeeping missions had always been raised by parts of the UN, whilst other parts had proven willing to approve the use of such force. In the aftermath of Operation Bøllebank, UN headquarters in Zagreb, Croatia, began investigating whether the Danes had broken the rules of engagement in place through excessive use of force. A debriefing showed that Danish forces had opened fire only after they had been fired upon and then only after a significant delay. According to Møller, UN headquarters took some measures to limit the freedom of movement of the Danish tanks after the incident. Hearings or investigation of the events of Operation Bøllebank were never undertaken by the Danish government. Another incident took place later that year between Danish peacekeepers and Serb forces near Gradačac in the course of Operation Amanda.

On a larger scale, the operation also resulted in serious consequences for the UNPROFOR and the reputation and legitimacy of UN peacekeeping. The Security Council’s decision to allow the use of force by UNPROFOR forces in self-defence and to collaborate with NATO to order air support resulted in great discrepancies between the military reality of conditions on the ground in Bosnia and traditionally-held understandings of the nature and role of UN peacekeeping. As was illustrated in the case of Operation Bøllebank, what resulted as a consequence of such discrepancies was a largely-disjointed system in which UNPROFOR forces, who were in principle authorised to use force and air support in self-defence, but they often had their requests denied by a UN leadership that was wary of allowing UNPROFOR forces to exercise such authorisations for fear of being perceived as a warring party itself. While not a direct consequence of Operation Bøllebank, the contradictory structures and mandate at the basis of UNPROFOR and the controversial role played by its operations in Bosnia and Herzegovina ultimately led the Security Council to disband UNPROFOR as a separate department in March 1995 and to restructure the programme into the separate-but-interlinked peacekeeping operations.

== Ongoing debate in Denmark ==
Operation Bøllebank has been referred to in the Danish media as a famous and historic event in Danish military history. In recent years, the incident has again received media attention after a nearly 600-page book by Lars Møller entitled “Operation Bøllebank” recounting the events was published in 2016. The description forwarded by Møller in his book has been a central driver in re-awakening debate about the series of events which occurred under the operation more than twenty years prior and bringing Operation Bøllebank back into Danish headlines.

Strong criticism since 2016 has mainly been raised by a group of soldiers who took part in Operation Bøllebank, and has targeted the leadership of Carsten Rasmussen, leader of the tank squadron at the time of the operation, and Møller himself, declaring official accounts of the operation to be false. Criticism of the operation’s leadership was first voiced in an interview with Erik Kirk, platoon leader of the second platoon. Although the interview with Kirk occurred nearly a decade before the publishing of Møller’s book, it was not until 2016, two years after Kirk’s death, that other members of the operation added their criticisms and brought the case into the media spotlight. Declaring the official accounts to be a standing joke, opposition to Møller’s and the official record of events was raised and corroborated by over 20 sources who had taken part in the operation.

The most hotly contested details of the accounts are those describing the commands given to put the second platoon into formation and the orders authorising the first platoon to return fire upon Serb military forces. Contrary to what stands in the official accounts, the alternate description of events described by a number of soldiers insist that Rasmussen and Møller remained silent over the radio and never gave direct orders for platoons to either assemble into formation or to fire upon the Serbs, requiring the tank commanders in the field to take matters into their own hands in order to avoid casualties during Operation Bøllebank. As one of the tank commanders recalls, there were no orders to put the second platoon into formation to provide protective fire as the first unit of tanks began to move forward, a failure to follow even the most basic military procedures which could have resulted in serious consequences for the Danish troops.

The allegations raised in 2016 became so significant that Danmarks Radio, Denmark’s state-owned broadcasting company, produced a special radio documentary on the operation in January 2017 under the title The Lie about Operation Bøllebank (Danish: Løgnen om Operation Bøllebank). Rasmussen and Møller both answered to the allegations raised against them with differing accounts of the events. In the radio documentary, Rasmussen maintains that as the first shots were fired by the Serb forces, he raced to his tanks to order the second platoon into position. Møller, on the other hand, claims that due to lack of time under the attack, explicit orders to put the second platoon’s tanks into formation were never given. Both Møller and Rasmussen, however, insist that the orders to return fire on the attacking Serbs were communicated by Møller himself over radio.

The broadcast was the source of considerable scandal as the accounts from the two leaders were met with further claims from tank commanders and other supporting troops that Rasmussen and Møller engaged media on such a high degree in order to claim credit for the mission’s success it and further their own careers. Rasmussen and Møller raised consequent allegations against DR’s journalistic integrity, resulting in the temporary removal of the broadcast before it was later re-broadcast under the new title Operation Bøllebank- The Fight for the Truth (Danish: Operation Bøllebank- Kampen om Sandheden). While the radio documentary and several other media investigations of the operation and the allegations against Møller and Rasmussen’s accounts succeeded in generating public debate and political pressure to have the official accounts reinvestigated, Defence Minister Claus Hjort Frederiksen claimed that the case had passed the statute of limitations, thus dismissing the possibility of further investigation.
