= Nordbat 2 =

Multinational peacekeeping battalion

NORDBAT 2
- Active: 1993 – 1995
- Countries: Denmark Norway Sweden
- Allegiance: UNPROFOR
- Role: Mechanized infantry
- Size: Battalion
- Garrison/HQ: Zivinice

Commanders
- First commander: Colonel Ulf Henricsson

NORDBAT 2 was a mechanized infantry battalion composed primarily of personnel from Denmark, Sweden, and Norway. The battalion took part in peacekeeping operations in Bosnia as part of UNPROFOR from 1993 to 1995, until the force was succeeded by IFOR following the Dayton Agreement. Following its engagements with the Bosnian Serb Army, NORDBAT 2 developed a reputation for responding to enemy attacks aggressively, in the face of restrictive UN rules of engagement.

== Organization ==
NORDBAT 2 consisted of a Danish tank squadron (DANSQN) and attached TACP, four Swedish mechanized infantry companies, a staff and supply company, and an engineer platoon. A Jordanian ground radar battery was attached to the unit. A separate Norwegian logistics battalion based in Tuzla provided logistical and medical support.

== Engagements ==
- Operation Bøllebank
- Operation Amanda
