= T-54/T-55 =

Main battle tank/medium tank family of Soviet origin, 1946

T-54/55
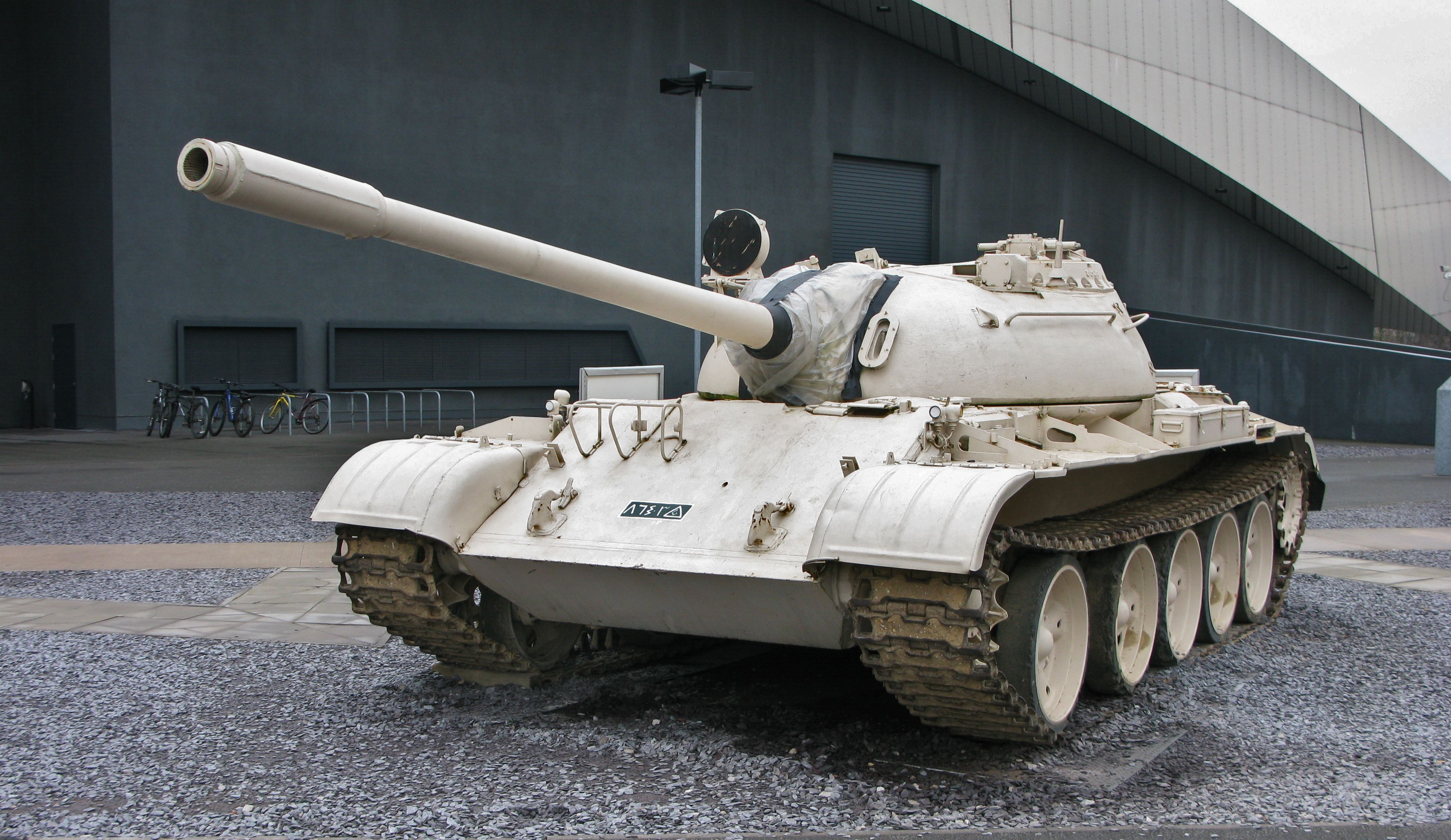
- A T-55 tank on display at the Imperial War Museum
- Type: Medium tank (Warsaw Pact designation); Main battle tank; (NATO designation)
- Place of origin: Soviet Union

Service history
- In service: 1948–present
- Used by: See Operators
- Wars: See Service History

Production history
- Designer: KMDB (T-54); OKB-520 (T-54A and later)
- Designed: 1945–1958
- Manufacturer: KhPZ, UVZ (Soviet Union); Bumar-Łabędy (Poland); ZTS Martin (Czechoslovakia)
- Unit cost: US$200,000 (export price to Egypt, 1956–1972)
- Produced: 1946–1981 (Soviet Union); 1956–1979 (Poland); 1957–1983 (Czechoslovakia); 1958–1985 (China)
- No. built: 96,500–100,000+ est., including: More than 35,000 T-54 and More than 27,500 T-55 (by Soviet Union); 13,000 Type-59/69/79 (by China); 11,000 T-54/55 (by Czechoslovakia); 10,000 T-54/55 (by Poland)
- Variants: See Operators and variants section below

Specifications (T-55)
- Mass: 36 metric tons (35.4 long tons; 39.7 short tons)
- Length: 9.00 m (29 ft 6 in) with gun forward
- Width: 3.37 m (11 ft 1 in)
- Height: 2.40 m (7 ft 10 in)
- Crew: 4
- Armour: 205 mm turret front; 130 mm turret sides; 60 mm turret rear; 30 mm turret roof; 120 mm hull front at 60° (100 mm after 1949); 79 mm hull upper sides; 20 mm hull lower sides; 60 mm at 0° hull rear; 20 mm hull bottom; 33–16 mm hull roof
- Main armament: D-10T 100 mm rifled gun (43 rounds)
- Secondary armament: 7.62 mm SGMT coaxial machine gun, (12.7 mm DShK heavy machine gun)
- Engine: Model V-55(V-54) V-12 water-cooled. 38.88-litre diesel 500 horsepower (373 kW) up to 800 horsepower (600 kW) (late versions)
- Power/weight: 14.6 horsepower per metric ton (10.9 kW/t)
- Transmission: Mechanical (synchromesh), 5 forward, 1 reverse gears
- Suspension: Torsion bar
- Ground clearance: 0.425 m (16.7 in)
- Fuel capacity: 580 L internal, 320 L external (less on early T54), 400 L jettisonable rear drums
- Operational range: 325 kilometres (202 mi), 610 kilometres (380 mi) with extra tanks (on unpaved roads)
- Maximum speed: 51 kilometres per hour (32 mph)

The T-54 and T-55 tanks are a series of Soviet medium tanks introduced in the years following the Second World War. The first T-54 prototype was completed at Nizhny Tagil by the end of 1945. From the late 1950s, the T-54 eventually became the main tank for armoured units of the Soviet Army, armies of the Warsaw Pact countries, and many others. T-54s and T-55s have been involved in many of the world's armed conflicts since their introduction in the second half of the 20th century. The T-54/55 series is the most-produced tank in history. Estimated production numbers for the series range from 96,500 to 100,000.

The T-54/55 was designed for ease of manufacture and simplicity of operation by a largely conscript army. As the T-54/55 was removed from front line to reserve service in most armies, its chassis was used as a basis for a wide variety of self-propelled guns, engineering and bridging vehicles, and armoured recovery vehicles - many still in use today.

The T-54/55 were replaced by the T-62, T-64, T-72, T-80 and T-90 tanks in Soviet and Russian armies, but are still used by up to 50 other armies worldwide, some having received sophisticated retrofitting. The Chinese version of the T-54A is the Type 59.

During the Cold War, Soviet tanks never directly faced their NATO adversaries in European combat. However, the T-54/55's first appearance in the West around the period of the 1950s (then the beginning of the Cold War) spurred the United Kingdom to develop a new tank gun, the Royal Ordnance L7, and the United States to create the M60 tank.

== Development history ==
=== Predecessors: T-34 and T-44 ===
The Soviet T-34 medium tank of the 1940s was well regarded, and development never stopped throughout the Second World War. It continued to perform well; however, the designers could not incorporate the latest technologies or major developments, as vital tank production could not be interrupted during wartime. In 1943, the Kharkiv Morozov Machine Building Design Bureau revived the prewar T-34M development project and produced the T-44. Thanks to a space-efficient torsion bar suspension, a novel transverse engine mount, and the removal of the hull machine-gunner's crew position, the T-44 had a cross-country performance at least as good as the T-34, but with substantially superior armour and a much more powerful 85 mm gun. However, the T-44 had severe teething problems, and mounted the same 85mm gun of the T-34/85. Small numbers of the T-44 were produced while designers sought to mount a D-10T 100mm gun in a larger turret.

=== Prototypes ===
Engineers accommodated the D-10T gun by enlarging the hull and turret, resulting in the prototype Object 137. The prototype was completed in late 1945 and accepted into service as the T-43 in April 1946. Testing revealed several drawbacks that needed correcting and many alterations that had to be made to the vehicle's design. Ammunition storage was reworked to accommodate the larger 100mm rounds, and the turret was reworked to eliminate the rear shot trap. The resulting T-54 model 1949 was put into full production by 1953 at Nizhny Tagil and Kharkiv.

=== T-54 ===
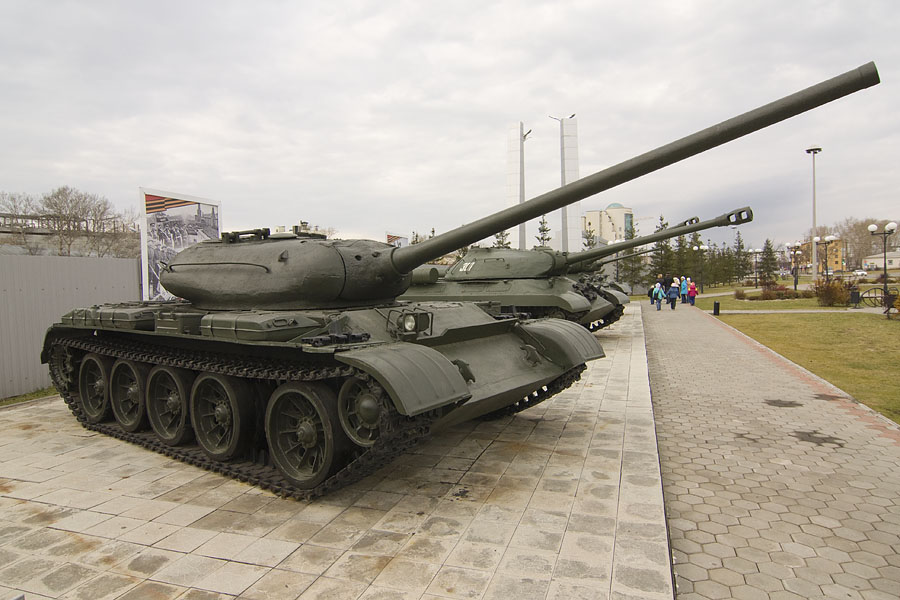
The original T-54-1. It has a turret reminiscent of the T-34-85s, with prominent, undercut shot traps. This example has the fender machine gun boxes replaced with fuel tanks.

The T-54 was an all-welded steel tank with the hull divided in three: driver's compartment at the front, fighting compartment in the middle, and the engine and transmission at the rear. The driver sat in the left front, with ammunition and fuel storage to his right. The driver had two day telescopes for driving while under fire. The remainder of the crew sat in the egg-shaped cast-and-welded-steel turret. The commander's position on the left side had a traversable cupola with periscopes for vision while buttoned up. The cupola also had a TPK-1 sight the commander could use to slew the main gun on a target. The gunner sat in front of the commander and used a TSh 2-22 sight for precision sighting and engagement of the designated target. The loader sat on the right side of the turret, and was responsible for reloading the main gun and manning a 12.7mm DShKM anti-aircraft gun. The D-10T 100mm main gun was not stabilized, and turret traversing and gun elevation were done manually. The transversely mounted diesel engine used an primary electrical starter, with a compressed air backup system. The T-54 rode on all-steel track and a torsion-bar suspension with five rubber-covered road wheels and no return rollers. The tank was equipped with two types of snorkels, one training and one combat, for deep fording, but lacked other specialized equipment like an NBC filtration system, and night vision devices. Lastly, the T-54 had four flat external tanks, one for engine oil, three for diesel fuel, and fittings for two fuel drums on the rear of the vehicle. Beside the previously mentioned DShKM, the T-54 mounted a 7.62mm SGMT machine gun coaxially with the main gun, and a second fixed machine gun firing from a hole in the glacis plate.

==== T-54A and T-54B ====
At the beginning of the 1950s, the personnel of the OKB-520 design bureau of the Stalin Ural Tank Factory No. 183 (Uralvagonzavod) had been changed considerably. Morozov was replaced by Kolesnikow, who in turn was replaced by Leonid N. Kartsev in March 1953. The first decision of the new designer was to fit the 100 mm D-10T tank gun with the STP-1 "Gorizont" vertical stabilizer, which resulted in the D-10TG main gun variant. A small muzzle counter-weight was installed but was later replaced with a fume extractor. Further modifications included an OPVT wading snorkel, an electrical oil pump, a bilge pump, modified air cleaner, an automatic fire extinguisher and extra fuel tanks.

This vehicle was designated T-54A (Ob'yekt 137G) and entered service in 1955. It served as a basis for the T-54AK command tank, with an additional R-112 radio set (front line tanks were equipped with an R-113 radio set), TNA-2 navigational device, ammunition load for the main gun decreased by 5 rounds and the AB-1-P/30 charging unit, which was produced in small numbers. In October 1954 a T-54A tank, designated as Ob'yekt 139 served as a testbed for new D-54T and D-54TS 100 mm smoothbore guns and "Raduga" and "Molniya" stabilization systems, and an upgraded engine. The tests were not successful but influenced the later T-62 series.

A new version, based on T-54A, designated T-54B (Ob'yekt 137G2), was designed in 1955. It was fitted with a new 100 mm D-10T2S tank gun with STP-2 "Tsyklon" 2-plane stabilizer. It entered production in 1957. The T-54B was later fitted with an L-2 "Luna" infrared searchlight, a TPN-1-22-11 IR gunner's sight, and an OU-3 IR commander's searchlight. Modern APFSDS ammunition was developed, dramatically enhancing the penetrative performance of the gun to keep it competitive with NATO armour developments. T-54B served as the basis for the T-54BK command tank, which had the same additional equipment as the T-54AK command tank.Some upgrades added to the T-54B, the night vision equipment and sites, were retrofitted to T-54 and T-54A vehicles. In the early 1980s, remaining T-54 A/B models were upgraded to the T-55 standards (see below) with upgraded suspension and armour, an uprated V-55U engine, and R-173 radio.

=== T-55 ===
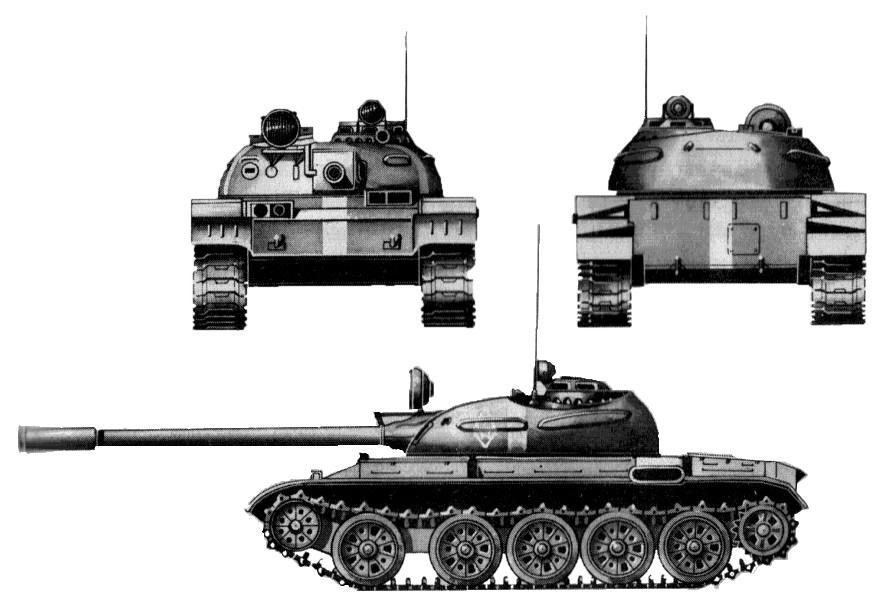
The T-55 front, rear and side elevations

Meanwhile, a design team at Nizhnyi Tagil developed the T-55 of 1958. This armored fighting vehicle featured a T-54 hull and chassis, mounting a new turret lacking the prominent mushroom ventilator dome, and a turret floor for increased crew efficiency. The tank was fitted with the new V-55 12-cylinder four-stroke one-chamber, 38.88-litre water-cooled diesel engine developing 581 hp (433 kW). Engine power was increased by raising the pressure of the fuel delivery and charging degree. The designers planned to introduce a heating system for the engine compartment and MC-1 diesel fuel filter. The engine was to be started pneumatically using an AK-150S charger and an electric starter. This eliminated the need for the tank to carry a tank filled with air. To allow easier access during maintenance and repairs, it was decided to change hatches over the engine compartment. To increase the operational range, 300 litres (66 imp gal; 79 US gal) fuel tanks were added to the front of the hull, increasing the overall fuel capacity to 680 litres (150 imp gal; 180 US gal). The ammunition load for the main gun was increased from 34 to 45, with 18 shells stored in so-called "wet containers" located in hull fuel tanks (the concept for which came from Kartsev's cancelled Ob'yekt 140). The ammunition load included high explosive-fragmentation and anti-tank rounds and designers also planned to introduce the BK5M high-explosive anti-tank (HEAT) rounds which penetrated 390 millimetres (15 in) thick armour. The TPKU commander's vision device was replaced by either the TPKUB or TPKU-2B. The gunner received a TNP-165 vision device. The loader's hatch-mounted 12.7 mm DShK anti-aircraft heavy machine gun was dropped, because it was deemed worthless against high-performance jets. The tank was supposed to have the "Rosa" fire protection system. The tank had a thicker turret casting, an improved two-plane gun stabilization system from the T-54B and night vision fighting equipment. To balance the weight of the new equipment, the armour on the back of the hull was thinned slightly. TThe T-55 served as a basis for the T-55K command tank equipped with an additional R-112 radio set, an AB-1-P/30 fuel-powered accumulator charging unit and a TPN-1-22-11 night vision sight. All this extra equipment made it necessary to decrease the ammunition load for the main gun to 37 rounds and eliminate the bow machine gun.

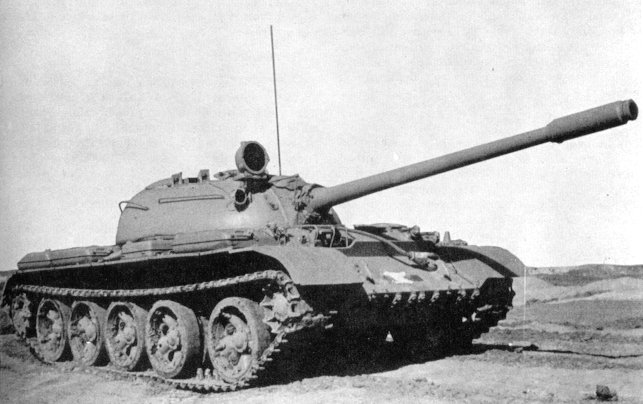
The original T-55 lacked an anti-aircraft machine gun mount.

At the beginning of the 1960s, a T-55K was experimentally fitted with a Uran TV relay apparatus for battlefield surveillance. The tank was equipped with an external camera, the picture from which was relayed to a receiver in a BTR-50PU command vehicle. There was an observation camera mounted on a folding mast which was in turn mounted on a UAZ 69 car. In 1961, a T-55 tank was used to test the "Almaz" TV complex, which was supposed to replace the standard observation devices right after a nuclear explosion or while fording a body of water. There was a camera mounted on the hull for the driver and two cameras mounted on the turret, one for aiming and one for observation, and the picture from the cameras was relayed to two control screens. The tank had the front hull fuel tanks and bow machine gun removed. The commander was seated in the driver's usual position while the driver sat beside him. The cameras allowed battlefield observation and firing during daytime at ranges between 1.5 and 2 kilometres (0.93 and 1.24 mi). Because of the low quality of the equipment, the trials gave negative results. At the beginning of the 1960s, the OKB-29 design bureau in Omsk adapted the tank to use a GTD-3T gas turbine engine developing 700 hp (522 kW). One T-55 tank fitted with this gas turbine engine passed trials but was deemed unsatisfactory, and the design did not go into production.

The Omsk OKB-29 group tested three experimental T-55 tanks (designated Ob'yekt 612) between 1962 and 1965 that were fitted with an automatic gearbox controlled by electro-hydraulic systems. The trials found that such gearboxes were prone to frequent breakdowns in tanks. At the same time, the Ob'yekt 155ML, a T-55 fitted with a launcher for three 9M14 "Malyutka" (NATO code: AT-3 Sagger) ATGMs mounted on the rear of the turret, was tested. Along with standard tanks, a flamethrower-armed version was designed (designated TO-55 (Ob'yekt 482)) and produced until 1962. It was fitted with 460-litre tanks filled with flammable liquid instead of the frontal wet ammunition rack. The flamethrower replaced the coaxial machine gun. This was a much better way to mount a flamethrower than in the experimental Ob'yekt 483, based on the T-54 tank, where the flamethrower replaced the main gun. TO-55 flamethrower tanks were withdrawn from service in 1993.

==== T-55A ====
The T-55A was introduced in 1961, and was the first main battle tank with an integral Nuclear, Biological, Chemical (NBC) system in the world. A plasticized lead antiradiation lining provided the needed protection against radiation resulting from a nuclear explosion. Protection against chemical agents was provided by a full PAZ/FVU chemical filtration system. A 7.62 mm PKT was installed to modernize the coaxial gun, while the fixed hull machine gun was removed and replaced by additional main gun storage. Other upgrades: smoke generator system; compressed air starter; redesigned fuel and ammunition storage; improved night vision, fording and fire suppression equipment. The T-55A served as the basis for the T-55AK command tank.

=== T-54/T-55 upgrades ===
In its long service life, the T-55 has been upgraded many times. Early T-55s were fitted with a new TSh-2B-32P sight. In 1959, some tanks received mountings for the PT-55 mine clearing system or the BTU/BTU-55 plough. In 1967, the improved 3BM-8 APDS round, which could penetrate 275 mm thick armour at a range of 2 km, was introduced. In 1970, new and old T-55 tanks had the loader's hatch modified to mount the 12.7 mm DShK machine gun, to deal with the threat of attack helicopters. Starting in 1974, T-55 tanks received the KTD-1 or KTD-2 laser rangefinder in an armoured box over the mantlet of the main gun, and the R-123 or R-123M radio set. Simultaneously, efforts were made to modernize and increase the lifespan of the drive train.

During production, the T-55A was frequently modernised. In 1965, a new track was introduced that could be used for between 2,000 km and 3,000 km, which was twice the range of the old track. It needed a new drive sprocket, with 14 teeth instead of 13. Since 1974, T-55A tanks were equipped with a KTD-1 "Newa" rangefinder and a TSzS-32PM sight. All T-55A tanks were equipped with the TPN-1-22-11 night sight. The R-113 radio set was replaced by a R-123 radio set. Late production models had rubber side skirts and a driver's windshield for use during longer stints.

T-54 and T-55 tanks continued to be upgraded, refitted, and modernised into the 1990s. Advances in armour-piercing and high-explosive anti-tank (HEAT) shaped charge ammunition would improve the gun's antitank abilities in the 1960s and 1980s.

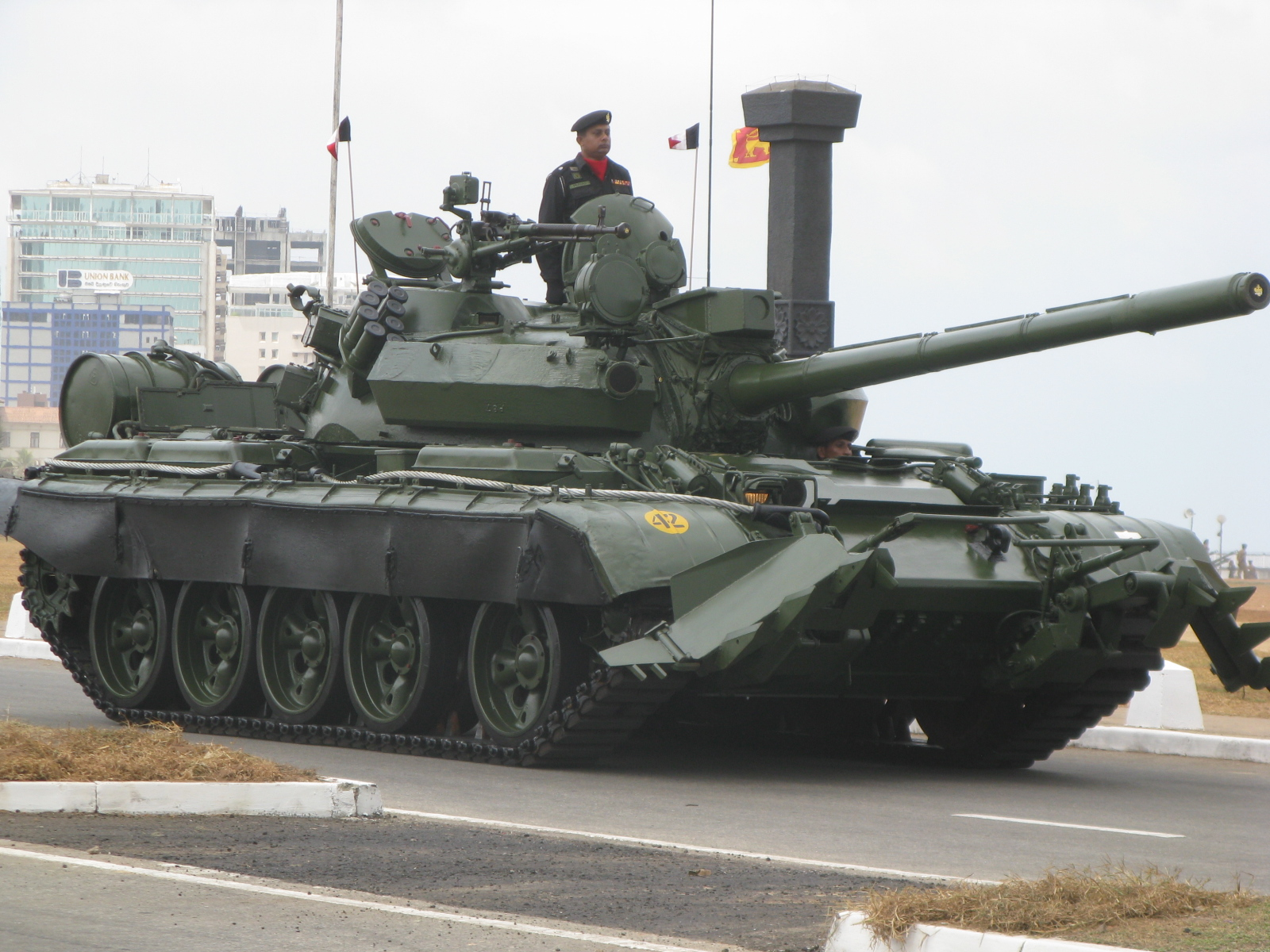
Sri Lanka Army T-55AM2

A wide array of upgrades in different price ranges are provided by many manufacturers in different countries, intended to bring the T-54/55 up to the abilities of newer MBTs, at a lower cost. Upgrades include new engines, explosive reactive armour, new main armament such as 120 mm or 125 mm guns, active protection systems, and fire control systems with range-finders or thermal sights. These improvements make it a potent main battle tank (MBT) for the low-end budget, even to this day.

One of these upgrade packages was a joint United States-China prototype designed and built by Cadillac Gage, now known as Textron. Two prototypes based on the Chinese Type 59 tank, a clone of the Soviet Union era T-54A, named Jaguar were produced in Detroit, Michigan. Modifications included a new turret design and an improved hull. The engine compartment and fuel tanks on the shelves over the tracks were armour-protected. The Soviet-made 100 mm gun was replaced with the American M68 105 mm rifled gun fitted with a thermal sleeve. A Marconi fire control system which was originally developed for the American light tank Stingray was fitted. The vehicle incorporated a Cadillac Gage weapon stabilizer and a gunner's sight equipped with an integral laser rangefinder. The powertrain was replaced with a Detroit Diesel 8V-92TA engine and XTG-411 automatic transmission. In 1989, two prototypes were completed. The chassis were provided by PRC, while the hull tops, turrets and powerplants were manufactured by Cadillac Gage Textron. Field testing of the prototypes began in October 1989, four months after the 1989 Tiananmen Square protests and massacre, which ended cooperation between China and Cadillac Gage.

Another prototype upgrade package was produced by Teledyne Continental Motors (now General Dynamics Land Systems) for the Egyptian Army and was known as the T-54E. After further modifications and trials it was sent into mass production and received the designation Ramses II.

As late as 2013, Ukrainian companies were reportedly developing T-55 main battle tank upgrades targeting the export market. The Type 59 is still in production, in several variants.

== Description ==
The T-54 and T-55 have a cabin layout shared with many post-World War II tanks, with the fighting compartment in the front, the engine compartment in the rear, and a dome-shaped turret in the hull's centre. The driver's hatch is on the front left of the hull roof. In the turret, the commander is seated on the left, with the gunner to his front and the loader on the right. The tank has a flat track, meaning no support rollers, the suspension has the drive sprocket at the rear and dead track. The engine exhaust is on the left fender. There is a prominent gap between the first and second road wheel pairs, a distinguishing feature from the T-62, which has progressively larger spaces between road wheels towards the rear.

The T-54 and T-55 tanks are outwardly similar and difficult to distinguish visually. The older T-54 can be distinguished from the T-55 by a dome-shaped ventilator on the front right of the turret and a driver-operated SGMT 7.62 mm machine gun mounted to fire through a tiny hole in the centre of the hull's front. Early T-54s lacked a gun fume extractor, had an undercut at the turret's rear, and a distinctive "pig-snout" gun mantlet. Soviet tanks were factory-overhauled every 7,000 km and usually given minor technology updates. Many states have added or modified the tank's equipment; India, for example, affixed fake fume extractors to its T-54s and T-55s so that its gunners would not confuse them with Pakistani Type 59s.

=== Advantages and drawbacks ===
By 1950s standards, the T-54 was excellent, packing considerable firepower and armour protection in a reliable design whilst also being smaller and lighter than contemporary NATO designs. The T-55's turret top was 2.39 meters, 70 centimeters less than the American M-48, and 55 centimeters less than the British Centurion. The shape of the turret and glacis plate and small size of the entire vehicle made the T-55 a difficult target to hit. However, at the time, the T-54 lacked effective sub-calibre ammunition and was reliant on HEAT rounds for anti-tank ammunition until the 1960s. This and the fact that the T-54 had a simple fire-control system meant that the T-54 was inaccurate at longer ranges. The T-55 was superior to the IS-2, IS-3 and T-10 heavy tanks in many respects, including the gun's rate of fire (at least four compared to fewer than three rounds per minute). Despite somewhat thinner frontal turret armour (200 millimetres (7.9 in) instead of 250 millimetres (9.8 in)), it compared favourably with the IS-3, due to its improved antitank gun and better mobility. As a consequence, the Red Army mothballed their heavy tanks and relied on the T-55 and its main battle tank descendants. The T-55 introduced the world's first first-generation protective suite for NBC protection. This was done due to Soviet researchers finding that the survivability of tanks and their crews against tactical nuclear weapons was poor. The low turret profile of the T-54/44 prevents them from depressing their main guns by more than 5° since the breech would strike the ceiling when fired, which limits the ability to cover terrain by fire from a hull-down position on a reverse slope. As with most tanks of that generation, the internal ammunition supply is not shielded, increasing the risk that any enemy penetration of the fighting compartment could cause a catastrophic secondary explosion. The T-54 lacked NBC protection and a turret basket, which meant that crewmen had to physically rotate and keep up with a rotating turret as the hull they stood in didn't move with the turret. Additionally, early models also lacked gun stabilisation. Most of these problems were corrected in the otherwise largely identical T-55 tank. The latter retained the cramped interior which reduced the crew's ability to engage targets rapidly and for a sustained period of time. Client states of the Soviet Union found the manufacturing finish of the T-54/55 were below Western standards, and with a correspondingly shorter operating life.

== Production history ==
=== Soviet Union ===
T-54-1 production was slow at first, as only 3 vehicles were built in 1946 and 22 in 1947. 285 T-54-1 tanks were built in 1948 by Stalin Ural Tank Factory No. 183 (Uralvagonzavod); by then it had completely replaced T-44 production at Uralvagonzavod, and Kharkiv Diesel Factory No. 75 (KhPZ). Production was stopped because of a low level of production quality and frequent breakdowns. The T-54-2 entered production in 1949 at Uralvagonzavod, which produced 423 tanks by the end of 1950. It replaced the T-34 in production at the Omsk Factory No. 183 in 1950. In 1951, over 800 T-54-2 tanks were produced. The T-54-2 remained in production until 1952. The T-54A was produced between 1955 and 1957. The T-54B was produced between 1957 and April 1959. The T-55 was produced by Uralvagonzavod between 1958 and 1962. The T-55K command tank was produced in 1959. The TO-55 (Ob'yekt 482) flamethrower tank was produced until 1962.

Overall, 35,000 T-54-1, T-54-2, T-54 (T-54-3), T-54A, T-54B, T-54AK1, T-54AK2, T-54BK1 and T-54BK2 tanks were produced between 1946 and 1958 and 27,500 T-55, T-55A, T-55K1, T-55K2, T-55K3, T-55AK1, T-55AK2 and T-55AK3 tanks were produced between 1955 and 1981.

Together, the T-54/55 tanks have been manufactured by the tens of thousands, and many remain in reserve or even in front-line use among lower-technology fighting forces. .

=== Polish People's Republic ===
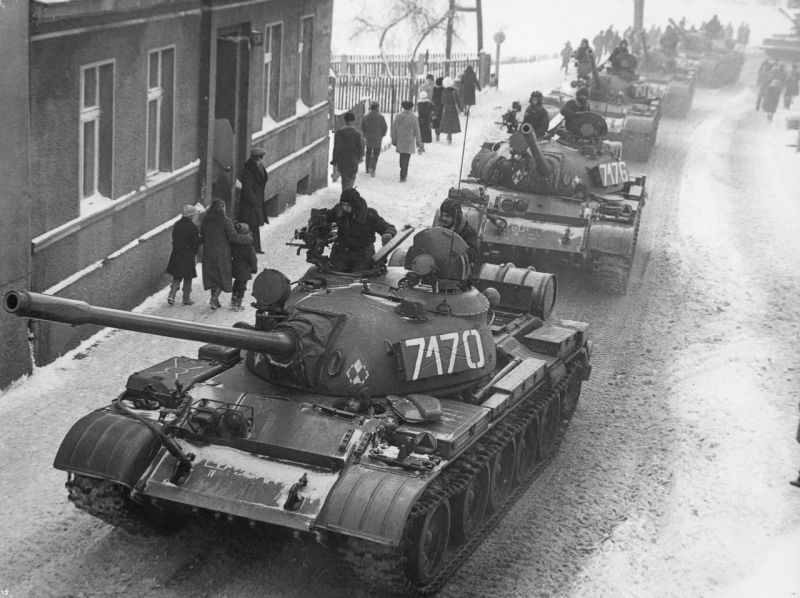
Polish T-55A tanks on the streets during Martial Law in Poland.

Polish People's Republic produced 3,000 T-54, T-54A, T-54AD and T-54AM tanks between 1956 and 1964 and 7,000 T-55 (between 1964 and 1968), T-55L, T-55AD-1 and T-55AD-2 tanks (between 1968 and 1979).

=== Czechoslovakia ===
Czechoslovakia produced 2,700 T-54A, T-54AM, T-54AK, T-54AMK tanks (between 1957 and 1966) and 8,300 T-55 and T-55A tanks (between 1964 and 1983; T-55A was probably produced since 1968). Most of them were for export.

=== China ===
T-54, locally known as Type 59, were the first model of tank mass-produced in the China. They were produced since 1958 in the Factory 617 in Baotou. PRC's military officials acquired the blueprints from Soviets after negotiations and made Type 59 tanks in many variations, making it the backbone of their military. Until 1985, 10,000 of those were produced. T-54 was also the basis for several other tanks, such as the light Type 62, the Type 69, and the Type 97.

Despite the popular claim, T-54s weren't the first tank ever to be produced in China—that was Type 97 ShinHōtō Chi-Ha medium tank, which was produced by captured Japanese engineers captured by PLA as a result of the Sino-Japanese war. However, all but one of those tanks were destroyed by said engineers before the production process was finished; only one of them survived.

== Service history ==
=== Soviet Union and successors ===
The Soviet Union produced around 95,000 T-54/T-55 until stopping production in 1981. As noted elsewhere, Red China, Romania, Poland and Czechoslovakia produced variants under license. Consequently, at the end of the Cold War, about 38% of the Red Army tank strength was in T-55s, and formed the majority of the tank strength for the Warsaw Pact nations.

Soviet T-54 tanks first saw combat in the Hungarian Revolution in 1956 and a few were successfully knocked out by the defending anti-Soviet Hungarian resistance fighters and rebels using Molotov cocktails and several anti-tank guns. The local anti-Soviet revolutionaries delivered one captured T-54A to the British Embassy in Budapest, the analyses and studies of which helped and spurred the development of the Royal Ordnance L7 105 mm tank gun.

At the initial stage of the war in Afghanistan in 1979–1980, about 800 Soviet tanks were used, consisting of 39 battalions, mainly armed with T-54s and T-55s. In 1979, only one T-55 tank was lost. Since the beginning of 1980, they began to be replaced by modern T-62 and T-64 tanks.

In Russia, most of the T-62s and the T-55s were auctioned off in 2012, with all Russian active-duty military units mainly operating the T-72, T-80, and the T-90. Remaining T-62s, T-55s and T-54s in storage have been reactivated to be used in combat in the Russian invasion of Ukraine.

In Ukraine, in 1997 The Military Balance reported that Ukraine had 154 T-55 tanks, but by 2014 the number was only 20, all in storage.

=== Middle East ===
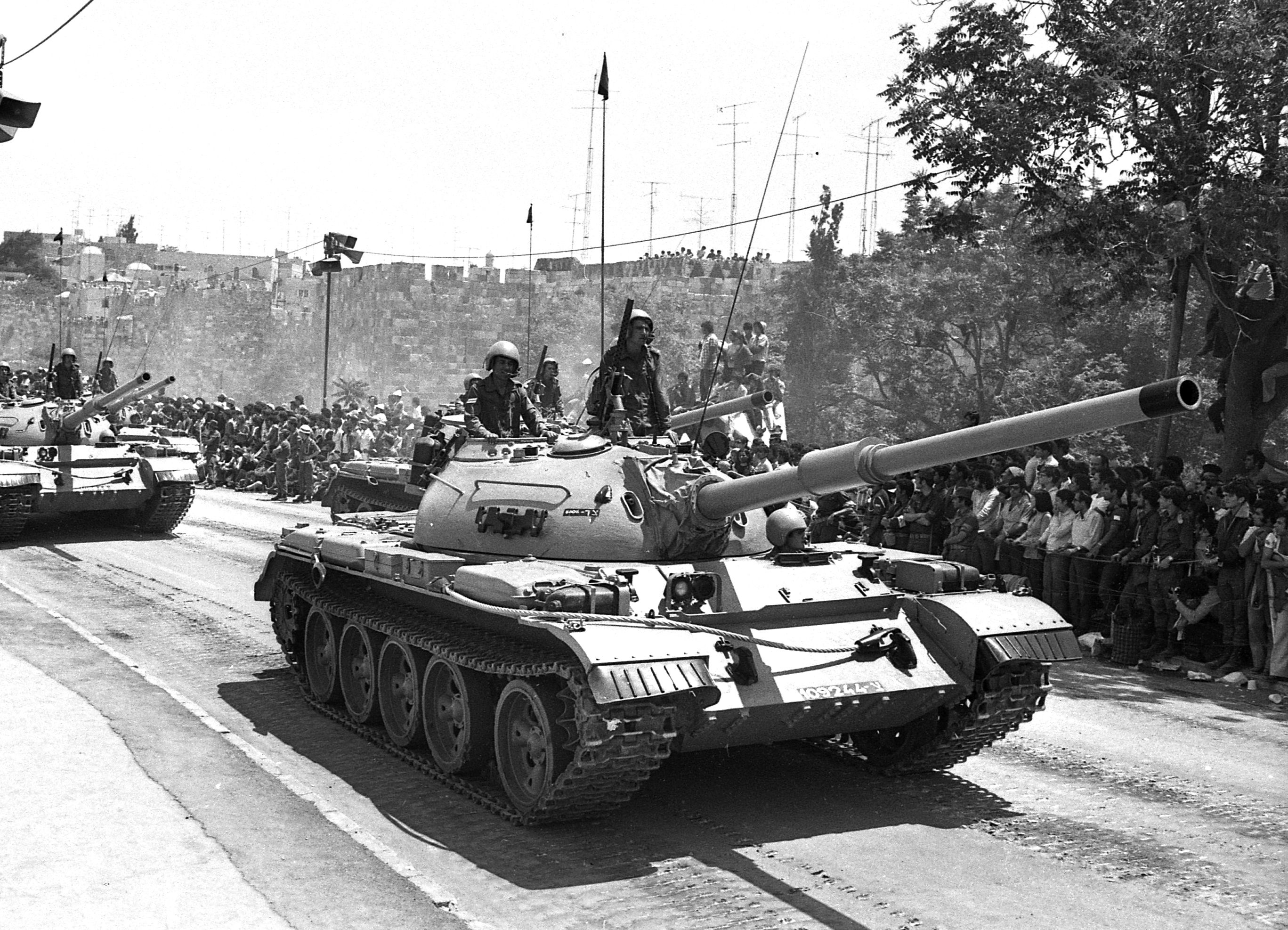
Israeli Tiran-4Sh tank, which was an upgraded T-54A up-gunned with a 105 mm M68 main gun.

During the 1967 Six-Day War, U.S.-supplied M48 Patton tanks, British Centurion tanks, and even upgraded World War II–era 75 mm M-50 and 105 mm armed M-51 Super Shermans faced T-55s. This mix of Israeli tanks, combined with superior planning of operations and superior airpower, proved to be more than capable of dealing with the T-54/T-55 series.

During the Jordanian Civil War, Syrian tanks inflicted heavy losses on Jordanian Centurions. In one case, a squadron of T-55s stopped the advance of a large Jordanian column, with 19 Centurions destroyed and up to 10 Syrian T-55s lost in the battle. According to Israeli intelligence, Jordan lost 75 to 90 tanks out of 200 involved, most to Syrian T-55 fire at ar-Ramtha. In turn total Syrian tank losses accounted to 62 T-55 mostly breakdowns left on enemy territory.

By the 1973 Yom Kippur War, the T-54A and T-55's guns were losing their competitive effectiveness relative to the 105 mm Royal Ordnance L7 gun mounted in Israeli Centurion Mk V and M60A1 tanks. Israeli tanks fitted with the L7 105mm gun suffered greatly from the new Soviet HEAT 3BК5 ammunition fired by the T-55s. During the entire war, 1,063 Israeli tanks were disabled (more than half of them Centurions), about 600 of which were destroyed or captured. Some 35 Israeli Centurions were captured by Egypt, dozens more were captured by Syria, Iraq and four by Jordan. On the other hand, 2,250 Arab tanks were disabled (including 33 Jordanian Centurions, 18 of them destroyed), 1,274 of them were completely destroyed or captured (643 tanks were lost in the north and 631 were lost in the south)

Israel captured many from Egypt in 1967, along with a few T-55s from Syria, and kept some of them in service. They were upgraded with a 105 mm NATO-standard L7 or M68, a US version of the L7, replacing the old Soviet 100 mm D-10, and a General Motors diesel replacing the original Soviet diesel engine. The Israelis designated these Tiran-5 medium tanks, and they were used by reserve units until the early 1990s. Most of these were then sold to assorted Third World countries, some of them in Latin America, and the rest were heavily modified, converted into the Achzarit heavy armoured personnel carrier.

In the Lebanese Civil War, on 10 June 1982, eight Israeli M48A3s, two M60A1s and at least three M113 APCs were lost in an ambush by Syrian T-55 tanks and BMP-1 APCs during the Battle of Sultan Yacoub.

The tank was heavily used during the Iran–Iraq War of 1980–88. T-54/55 participated in the biggest tank battle of the war in early 1981. Iran lost 214 Chieftain and M60A1 tanks in the battle. In return, Iraq lost 45 T-55 and T-62 tanks. Another known tank battle occurred on 11 October 1980, when a large Iranian convoy supported by a battalion of Chieftains (92nd Division) was ambushed by a battalion of Iraqi T-55s (26th Brigade). During the battle, the Iranians lost 20 Chieftains plus other armoured vehicles and withdrew.

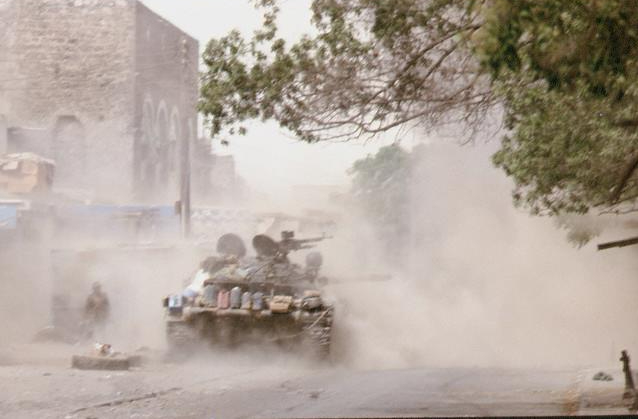
T-55 tank of the Government Yemeni forces fights in Aden city.

Many Iraqi T-55s saw action during Operation Desert Storm in Iraq and Kuwait in January/February 1991, and during the 2003 US/UK invasion of Iraq with poor results.

T-55 tanks also were used in the Yemeni civil war in 1994, both by the government army and by the South Yemeni separatists. They were the main tanks of both sides and were used most actively (along with the T-62).

=== Vietnam War ===
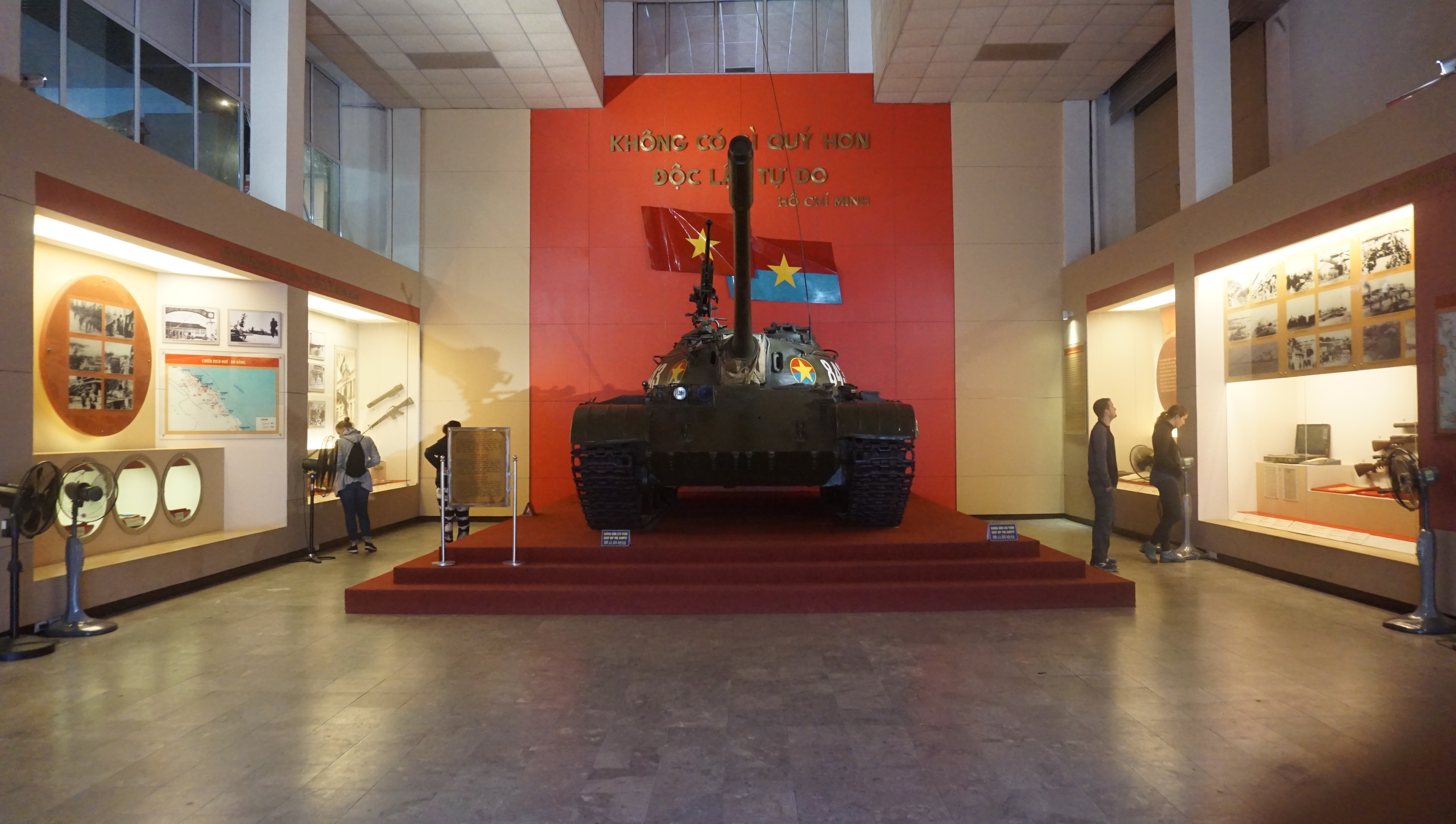
An LASV-colored T-54 tank on display in the Vietnam Military History Museum in Hanoi.

During the Vietnam War, the People's Army of Vietnam (PAVN) and its proxy military force, the Liberation Army of South Vietnam (LASV), used T-54s, along with its Chinese-built copy (the Type 59), extensively against the South Vietnamese Army of the Republic of Vietnam (ARVN) and their allied US forces.

The PAVN/LASV and the ARVN engaged each other with tanks for the first time during Operation Lam Son 719 in February 1971. During that battle, 17 M41 Walker Bulldog light tanks of the ARVN's 1st Armoured Brigade claimed to have destroyed 22 PAVN tanks, a total of 6 T-54s and 16 PT-76 light amphibious tanks, at no loss to themselves, but their friendly units lost 5 M41s and 25 armoured personnel carriers (APCs), mainly M113 APCs.

On Easter Sunday, 2 April 1972, the newly activated ARVN 20th Tank Regiment, comprising approximately 57 M48A3 Patton main battle tanks (note that ARVN regiments were equivalent to US battalions, and ARVN squadrons were comparable to US companies or troops) received reports from friendly intelligence units of a large PAVN armoured column moving towards Dong Ha, the largest South Vietnamese city near the Vietnamese DMZ located on the 17th Parallel. At about noontime, the tank crewmen of the ARVN's 1st Squadron observed enemy armour moving south along Highway 1 towards Dong Ha and promptly concealed their tanks on high ground with a good vantage point against their enemy. Waiting for the PAVN tank column to close to between 2500 and 3000 meters, the 90mm main guns of the Patton tanks opened fire and quickly destroyed nine PT-76s and two T-54s. The surviving PAVN armour, unable to locate their enemy's positions, hastily turned about and withdrew shortly afterwards.

On 9 April 1972, all three squadrons of the 20th Tank Regiment (57 M48 tanks) fought hard against enemy armour, firing upon PAVN tanks accompanied by large masses of infantry, again while occupying the strategically important high ground. This time, similarly, the Pattons opened fire at approximately 2800 meters. A few answering shots from the T-54s fell short and the PAVN tanks began to scatter after suffering considerable losses and heavy casualties. By the end of the day, the 20th claimed to destroy sixteen T-54s and captured one Type 59 at no loss to themselves. (The PAVN confirmed six tanks were destroyed or damaged) On 27 April, heralded by massive artillery attacks, a new PAVN offensive began against ARVN positions. The barrage was quickly followed by violent attacks by PAVN infantry and a T-54 tank. By 2 May, the 20th Tank Regiment had lost all of their tanks to enemy fire. During the first month of the First Battle of Quảng Trị, all ARVN M48 Pattons (100 tanks) were lost. (Note: 1st Armor Brigade lost 43 M48s and 66 M41s, 20th Tank Regiment lost 57 M48s)

PAVN armoured units equipped with the T-54 tank achieved one of their largest victories in April 1972 when the PAVN 203rd Armoured Regiment attacked the ARVN's 22nd Infantry Division based at Tân Cảnh Base Camp, which dominated a main route into the city of Kon Tum, located near the 17th Parallel. After a two-day-long intense artillery barrage, eighteen T-54 tanks attacked the camp at dawn from two different directions, thus breaking apart the ARVN unit into two and splitting up its forces, which quickly abandoned its positions and withdrew. T-54 tank No. 377 had managed to destroy seven ARVN M41s before it was finally destroyed by M72 LAW anti-tank rocket launchers fielded by the South Vietnamese infantry. The PAVN destroyed 18 M41 light tanks with 31 M113 APCs and captured 17 M41s intact while losing only two T-54 tanks and one PT-76 tank in the armoured skirmish.

At the very end of the war on 30 April 1975, a PAVN T-54 smashed through the main gate of the RVN Presidential Palace in the capital city of Saigon, accompanied by onrushing North Vietnamese troops after North Vietnam conquered the South. This widely seen image has come to be regarded by many as perhaps the defining moment of the end of the bloody 20-year-long conflict in Vietnam and the fall of the Republic of Vietnam. During the war, PAVN tank units were involved in 211 battles, claimed 20,000+ enemy killed, destroyed more than 2,000 enemy tanks/APCs, 870 other military vehicles, and 3,500 enemy bunkers, and shot down 35 aircraft or helicopters, overwhelmingly using T-54s. The PAVN lost an estimated 250 (1972 - 150, 1973-1975 - 100) T-54s during the war.

Following the Vietnam War, Vietnam's T-54/55s and Type 59s continued to see much combat activity against neighbouring Cambodia and China to their north between 1978 and 1979. Just like many developing countries around the world which continue to operate the T-54/55, at least 900 T-54s, along with a similar number of T-55s and Type 59s, are still in active military service with the Socialist Republic of Vietnam until the present day. Some of them are slated to be replaced by the more modern T-90S/SK.

=== Ogaden War ===
During the largest tank battle of the Ogaden War – the Battle of Jijiga (August–September 1977), 124 Somali tanks, mostly T-55s, defeated 108 Ethiopian tanks, mainly M47 Pattons and M41 Walker Bulldogs. The Ethiopians lost 43 tanks during the battle.

=== Angola ===
T-54/T-55s began appearing in Southern Africa in the late 1970s, when many emerging Marxist states, particularly Angola and Mozambique, were bolstered with modern Soviet military hardware. The T-55's dependability and ruggedness proved well-suited to the local combat environments. Survivability of opposing medium-armour vehicles deployed by UNITA and the South African Defence Force (SADF) against late model MBTs used in the Angolan Civil War remained a major concern throughout that conflict. Angolan Army T-54s were first blooded during Operation Askari, in 1981. At least five were subsequently destroyed in encounters with South African Eland or Ratel-90 armoured cars, and some were captured. Soviet sources confirm that many T-55s were penetrated by an Eland's 90 mm low-pressure gun. Nevertheless, multiple HEAT rounds were needed to guarantee sufficient damage against a T-55's frontal arc and SADF anti-tank teams forced to operate in platoons accordingly.

During the Battle of Cuito Cuanavale, another three T-55s of Angola's 21st Brigade were shot out by Ratel IFVs armed with ZT3 Ingwe ATGMs near the Lomba River. On 9 November 1987, an engagement between South African and Angolan tanks occurred when thirteen Olifant Mk1As eliminated two T-55s in a nine-minute skirmish. T-55s again participated in a critical engagement near Cuito Cuanavale on 14 February 1988, when Cuba's 3rd Tank Battalion counter-attacked to spare Angola's 16th Brigade virtual annihilation by 61 Mechanised Infantry Battalion Group and the 4th South African Infantry Battalion. Six T-55s were lost (three to RPGs, three to Olifants and one more was damaged), but the attack blunted the South African advance, safeguarding the cohesion of the Angolan line. Cuban and Soviet sources maintain that they destroyed ten Olifant tanks and twelve Ratels, while South African and Western sources maintain that only one Olifant and one Ratel were damaged, and one Ratel destroyed.

=== India and Pakistan ===
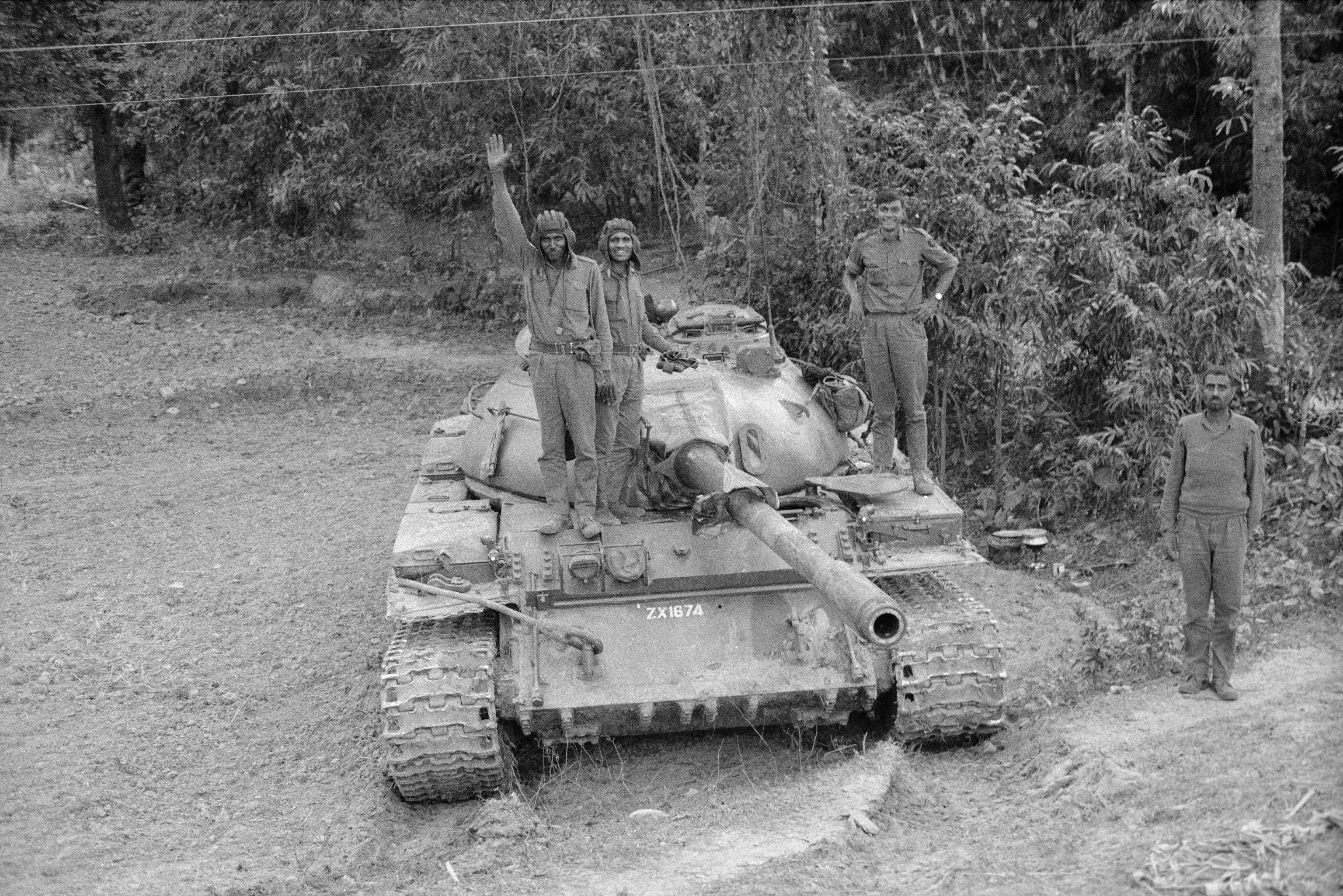
Indian Army T-55 during the incursion into Jessore, East Pakistan in 1971.

The Indian Army first bought the T-54 from the Soviet Union, Poland and Czechoslovakia in 1966 and have used their T-54s and T-55s extensively in its conflicts with Pakistan between the 1970s to the 1980s. Pakistan also used some T-54As and Chinese Type 59 copies.At one point prior to 1971, India added fake bore evacuators to its tanks, to enable them to be distinguished easily from Pakistan's tanks.

The first meeting of the Indian T-55 with enemy tanks occurred in the area of Garibpur on 22 November 1971. Indian T-55 tanks (63 Cavalry) destroyed 3 Pakistani M24 Chaffee tanks (29 Cavalry) in the area.On 10–11 December, during the Battle of Nainakot, Indian T-55s (14 Cavalry Scinde Horse) in two battles destroyed 9 Pakistani M47/48 tanks (33 Cavalry), without any loss.

During the Battle of Basantar, also known as the Battle of Barapind (4–16 December 1971), which was one of the most vital battles fought as part of the Indo-Pakistani War of 1971, India had destroyed close to 46 M48 tanks and lost 10 tanks in the process. At the end of the war, one of the last tank battles took place in the Naogaon area, a company of Pakistani Chaffee tanks attacked Indian T-55s but lost 5 Chaffee tanks and was forced to retreat to Bogra.

During the 1980's and 1990's India engaged in an upgrade programme for their T-55 fleet, with the aid of Poland under Project Gulmohur. 450 Indian tanks, out of an initial fleet of 715 were modified at the 512 Base Workshop with night vision equipment, digital computers and improved fire control systems from the Arjun MBT along with armour upgrades. The tanks were also upgunned with the British L7 gun that equipped India's Centurion and Vijayantha MBTs and were capable of firing more advanced K.E shells, HEAT and ARDE's newly developed FSAPDS ammunition. The tanks were progressively retired after 2000, and the last 67 were sent into reserve after the Arjun MBT entered full service in 2011.

=== Operation Desert Shield/Storm ===
The Iraqi force that invaded Kuwait in August 1990 consisted of Iraqi Army infantry, armored and mechanized divisions, each with one or more organic armored brigades equipped with T-55 and T-62 tanks. Eight Republican Guard divisions, equipped with T-72 tanks, also took part in the invasion. In the face of the Desert Storm Coalition buildup, the Iraqi forces in Kuwait assumed a strategic defense. Based on experiences from the Iran-Iraq War, the Iraqi armored units sought to fight from a reverse-slope position, with their tanks covered partially by earth revetments, and the Republican Guard divisions held as in operational reserve. In August 1990, the Iraqi had perhaps 3,475 to 4,300 tanks operation tanks in Kuwait. As noted above, the Iraqi Army divisions were equipped with a mix of T-62, Soviet T-55/T-55A, and T-55 variants produced in Czechoslovakia, Poland and Rumania. The Iraqis also obtained significant numbers of Type 69-II from the People's Republic of China. Some newer Type 69-II AFV were fitted with "boom shields" or supplemental applique armour to disrupt HEAT warheads from RPG-7 and Sagger antitank rockets, as well as uprated diesel engines, smoke grenades, and an improved skirt shield.

During the air-campaign shaping phase in early 1991, the Iraqi Army lost a number of tanks and AFVs and a severe degradation of morale due to constant Coalition attacks. On the eve of the Coalition ground operations, intelligence estimates showed almost 40% of the Iraqi Army armour had been knocked out. The Iraqi T-55 and T-62 tanks fared poorly against American M1A1 and M60A1 tanks equipped with modern thermal sights. The I Marine Expeditionary Force (I MEF) advance into Kuwait destroyed an estimated 460 Iraqi tanks and 218 AFVs, and seized 600 tanks and 390 AFVs. At the end of the campaign, the US Army figured total Iraqi tanks losses at 3,847 of 4,280 committed to battle. The Coalition tankers found the export T-72 decidedly inferior to even older tanks like the French AMX302B and US Marine Corps M60A1 RISE AFVs. The T-55 tanks fared even worse, even when covered by earth revetments. The Iraqi tanks lacked modern thermal imaging sites, which limited their effective engagement range to one kilometer or less - half the distance of the M1A1. The Iraqi tank gun ammunition used steel penetrators, instead of tungsten or uranium, and fared poorly against Coalition tanks. Lastly, the Soviet tanks were prone to a catastrophic detonation of its main gun ammunition in the event the tank hull was penetrated by an enemy sabot or shaped charge round.

=== Russo-Ukrainian War ===
On 7 July 2014, a T-54 from a museum in Donetsk was commissioned into the Russian people's militias.

Footage from the Battle of Mariupol (May 2022) indicates that Ukrainian soldiers used a single T-54 which had previously been converted to a historical memorial at the Azovstal plant. The tank was removed from the pedestal, probably towed to its combat position and used by Ukrainian soldiers as a static pillbox. According to the few existing pictures, the vehicle was heavily damaged in combat and abandoned.

Ukrainian soldiers trained with 28 M-55S tanks delivered in October 2022 by Slovenia. The Model M-55S is a heavily reinforced tank that has been updated with a NATO L7 105 mm gun, upgraded armour protection, a digital ballistic computer, an upgraded engine and new tracks. In December 2022 the volunteer 47th Assault Brigade was equipped with 28 M-55S. On 14 July 2023, an M-55S received a direct hit into the upper armour by a 152 mm guided Krasnopol Russian artillery shell. The tank and crew survived due to reactive armour upgrades. A few days later on 22 July, a second Ukrainian M-55S took a direct hit west of Kreminna and exploded.

On 21–22 March 2023, photos and videos of a Russian military train with T-54s and T-54Bs appeared on social media. Images of T-55 in Ukraine first emerged in April 2023 confirming their deployment by the Russian armed forces. On 19 June, footage of a Russian T-54/55 converted into a remote-controlled VBIED being destroyed by Ukrainian forces near Marinka, Donetsk Oblast was released.

As of October 2026, Russia is visually confirmed to have suffered 28 T-54/55 losses (2 T-54-3M, 4 T-54B, 11 T-55A, 2 T-55A Obr. 1981, and 9 unknown T-54/55).

An analysis of Russian armour tactics in Ukraine by the Royal United Services Institute claimed that Russian T-55s are not deployed as front-line armour assets but as assault guns attached to infantry formations. RUSI further claimed it is due to shortages of Russian infantry fighting vehicles (IFVs), which normally fulfil the role of providing organic fire support to infantry. The T-55s' main armament range and optics are superior to those of many Russian IFVs such as the BMP-2, prompting Russian commanders to favour using them in support of infantry engagements at longer standoff ranges, where they cannot be easily countered by Ukrainian man-portable anti-tank weapons.

=== Other conflicts ===
T-54 tanks were used during the Cambodian Civil War and the Cambodian–Vietnamese War between the 1970s to the 1980s. During the Uganda–Tanzania War of 1978 to 1979, Libya sent an expeditionary military force to aid Ugandan dictator Idi Amin in his conflict with Tanzania, which included the supply of a few dozen T-54/55 tanks. Some of these tanks saw action against Tanzanian forces., with at least limited success.

In Poland in 1983–83, T-55L tanks were deployed during the imposition of martial law to intimidate the population (seemingly growing ever-more anti-communist) and to suppress overt displays against their communist government.

The T-55 was the most numerous tank of the Yugoslav People's Army (JNA). It was the mainstay of armoured combat units during the Yugoslav Wars, where it proved vulnerable to infantry equipped with anti-tank rockets and weaponry and to misemployment in urban areas and unfriendly terrain. But there were too many of them in service for them to be replaced entirely. During the Battle of Vukovar, where the JNA grouped a large part of its tank force, several were destroyed, almost exclusively by infantry-carried anti-tank weapons. The T-55 tank remained the most common tank in the armies of the various Yugoslavian successor states until recently, and it was the most used tank by all armies during the decades-long wars. T-55s were also used by Yugoslavia in the Kosovo War and Macedonia (now North Macedonia) during the 2001 insurgency in Macedonia and by Russian peacekeepers after the withdrawal of Yugoslav forces from Kosovo. The Kosovo Liberation Army (National Liberation Army of Kosovo) captured a T-55 from the Macedonian Army during the battle of Raduša.

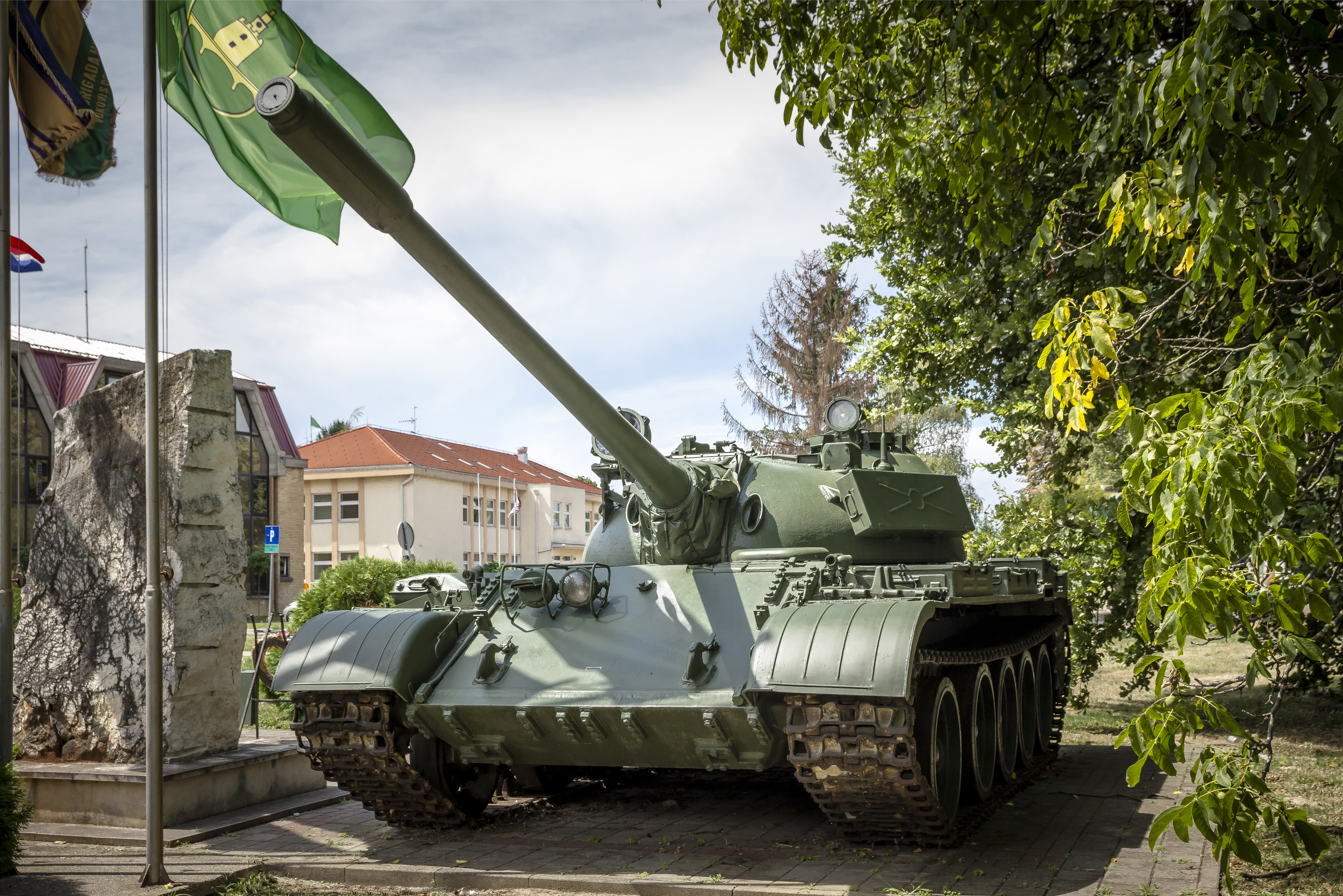
Yugoslav T-55 tank captured by the Croatian army during the Croatian War of Independence now displayed in the city of Valpovo, Croatia

The T-55 has been used by Ethiopia in the conflict with the Islamic Courts Union in Somalia and used by various warring factions in the Somali Civil War after the fall of the dictatorial Siad Barre regime in the 1990s.

China produced thousands of Type 59 tanks (based on the Soviet T-54A) for the People's Liberation Army, which were used during the Vietnam War and used en-masse against Vietnam in the Sino-Vietnamese War. China sold the similar (but upgraded) Type 69 tanks to both Iran and Iraq during the Iran–Iraq War between 1980 and 1988.

The Sri Lanka Army acquired 25 T-55As and 2 T-55 ARVs from Czechoslovakia in 1991, forming its first tank unit, the 4th Armoured Regiment of the Sri Lanka Armoured Corps. The T-55s were first used in Operation Balavegaya II in an offensive capacity. Due to the operation demands of the escalating Sri Lankan Civil War, T-55As of the regiment were deployed in pairs to forward bases to support infantry with limited training. This resulted in the capture of two T-55A tanks by the LTTE in the Battle of Pooneryn in November 1993. One of these was destroyed soon after by the Sri Lanka Air Force, while the other was operated by the LTTE until the last days of the war when it was re-captured. The T-55s spearheaded Operation Riviresa. In 2000, the army acquired Czech T-55AM2s deployed in offensive operations supporting infantry during the pitch battles of the last stages of the Sri Lankan Civil War including the Battle of Jaffna.

T-55 tanks have seen use on both sides of the 2011 Libyan civil war, with anti-Gaddafi forces either stealing them or having them contributed by defecting members of the Libyan Army.

T-55s have been used by the Sudanese Armed Forces during the conflict in South Kordofan and Blue Nile. At least 4 were captured and 1 destroyed by the Sudan People's Liberation Movement-North on 10 December 2012.

The T-55 has seen active combat service with the FARDC of the Democratic Republic of the Congo, supported by the United Nations Force Intervention Brigade (UN FIB), in 2013–14 during the campaign to suppress the March 23 Movement (M23) rebel group.

Russia announced that several T-55 tanks used by ISIL in Syria were destroyed in an air attack conducted by its forces on 5 October 2015.

=== List of conflicts ===
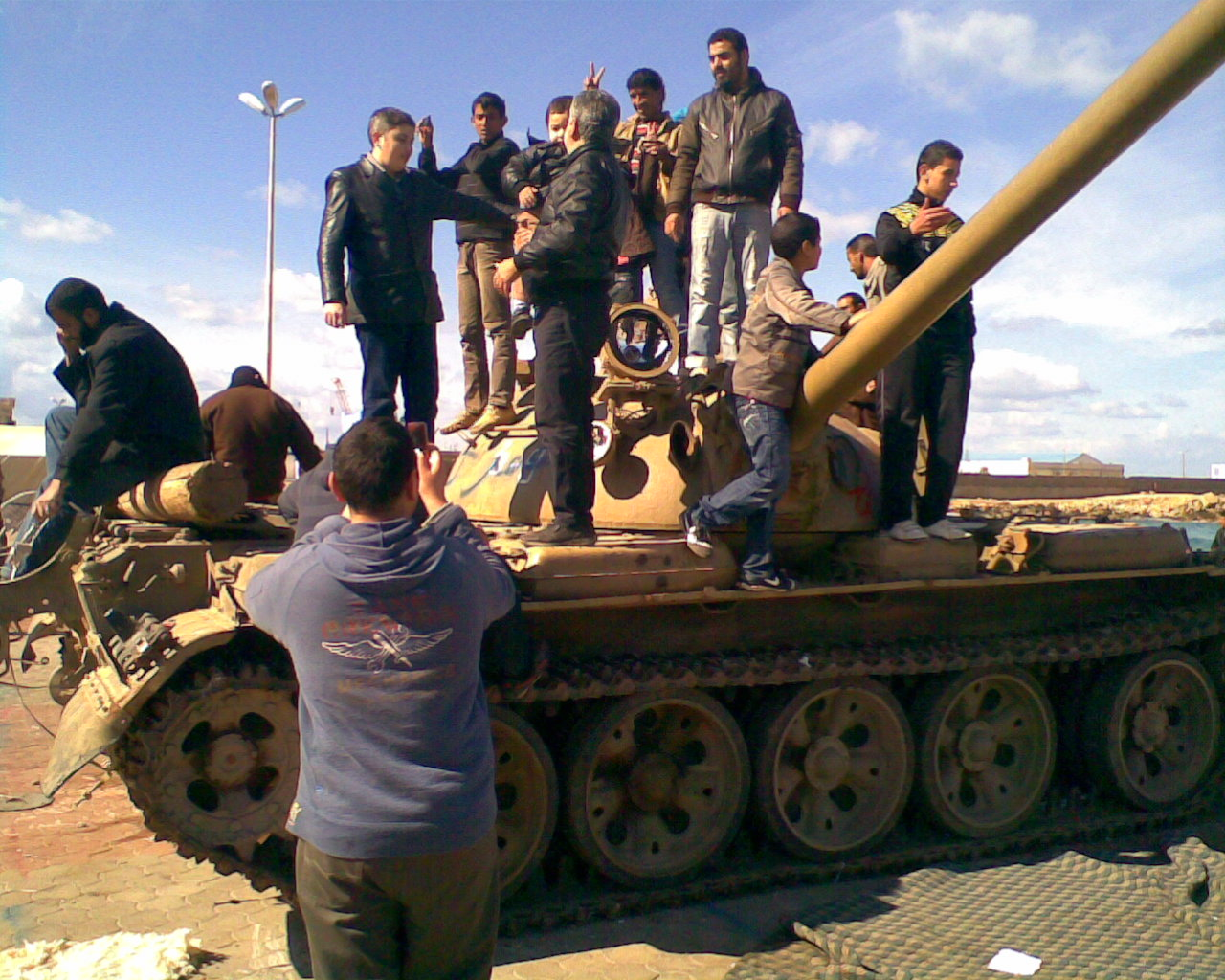
Civilians crowding atop a T-55 tank in Libya in 2011.

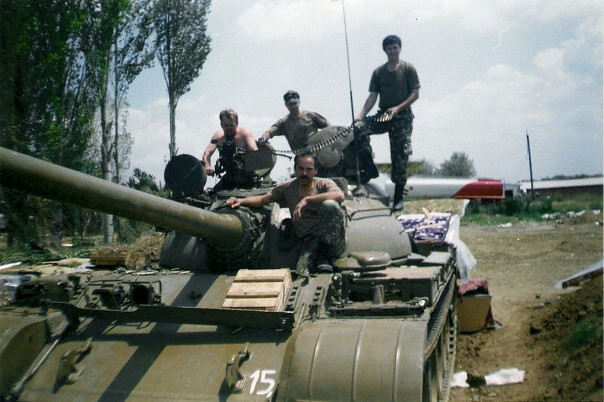
A Macedonian Army T-55A tank and its crew, shown here in 2001.

- 1955–1975: Vietnam War (North Vietnam)
- 1956: Hungarian Revolution of 1956 (Soviet Union)
- 1961–1991: Iraqi–Kurdish conflict (Iraq and Peshmerga)
- 1961–1991: Eritrean War of Independence (Ethiopia and EPLF)
- 1966–1990: South African Border War (Angola)
- 1967: Six-Day War (Egypt and Syria)
- 1968: Warsaw Pact invasion of Czechoslovakia (Soviet Union and Poland)
- 1970: Black September (Syria)
- 1971: Indo-Pakistani War of 1971 (India)
- 1973: Yom Kippur War (Egypt, Syria and Iraq)
- 1974-1975: Shatt al-Arab conflict (Iraq)
- 1974–1991: Ethiopian Civil War (Ethiopia, TPLF and EPLF)
- 1975–1990: Lebanese Civil War (Lebanese government forces and militias)
- 1975–1991: Western Sahara War (Morocco and Polisario)
- 1975–2002: Angolan Civil War (Angola and UNITA)
- 1977–1978: Ogaden War (Ethiopia, Somalia and Cuba)
- 1978–1987: Chadian–Libyan War (Libya)
  - 1986–1987: Toyota War
- 1978: Uganda–Tanzania War (Uganda and Libya)
- 1978–1989: Cambodian–Vietnamese War (Vietnam)
- 1979–1988: Soviet–Afghan War (Afghanistan and Soviet Union)
- 1979: Rhodesian Bush War (Rhodesia)
- 1980–1988: Iran–Iraq War (Iran and Iraq)
- 1981–1991: Somaliland War of Independence (Somalia and SNM)
- 1982–1983: 1982 Lebanon War (Syria and PLO)
- 1983–2009: Sri Lankan civil war (Sri Lankan government forces and LTTE)
- 1983–2005: Second Sudanese Civil War (Sudanese government forces and SPLA)
- 1989-1992: Afghan Civil War (1989–1992) (Hezb-e Islami Gulbuddin and Afghanistan)
- 1989: Romanian Revolution (Romania)
- 1988–1993: Georgian Civil War
  - 1991–1992: 1991–1992 South Ossetia War (Georgia)
  - 1992–1993: War in Abkhazia (1992–1993) (Georgia and Abkhazia)
- 1990–1991: Gulf War (Iraq)
- 1991–present: Somali Civil War
- 1991: 1991 Iraqi uprisings (Iraq, Peshmerga and Shiite rebels)
- 1991–1995: Yugoslav Wars (Yugoslavia)
  - 1991: Ten-Day War (Yugoslavia)
  - 1991–1995: Croatian War of Independence (Yugoslavia, Croatia and Republic of Serbian Krajina)
  - 1992–1995: Bosnian War (Bosnia and Herzegovina and Republika Srpska)
  - 1994: Operation Bøllebank (Republika Srpska and UNPROFOR forces)
  - 1994: Operation Amanda (Republika Srpska and UNPROFOR forces)
- 1994: Yemeni Civil War (1994) (Yemen and South Yemeni separatist forces)
- 1997: 1997 clashes in Cambodia (Cambodian government forces)
- 1998–1999: Kosovo War (Army of Yugoslavia)
- 1998–2000: Eritrean–Ethiopian War (Eritrea and Ethiopia)
- 1998: Guinea-Bissau Civil War
- 2001: 2001 insurgency in Macedonia (Macedonia)
- 2001–2021: War in Afghanistan (2001–2021) (Northern Alliance and Afghanistan.)
- 2003–2020: War in Darfur (Sudanese government forces)
- 2003–2011: Iraq War
  - 2003: Invasion of Iraq (Iraq)
- 2005–2010: Chadian Civil War (2005–2010) (Chadian government forces)
- 2006-2009: War in Somalia (2006–2009) (Ethiopia)
- 2008: Russo-Georgian War (Abkhazia and South Ossetia.)
- 2011: First Libyan Civil War (Gaddafi Government and anti-Gaddafi forces.)
- 2011–2024: Syrian Civil War (Syrian government forces, ISIS and Rebels)
- 2011–2020: Sudanese conflict in South Kordofan and Blue Nile (Sudanese Government forces)
- 2012–2013: M23 rebellion (Democratic Republic of Congo and March 23 Movement)
- 2014–2017: War in Iraq (2013–2017) (Iraq and ISIS)
- 2014–present: Russo-Ukrainian War
  - 2022–present: Russian Invasion of Ukraine (Ukraine and Russia)
- 2014–2020: Second Libyan Civil War (Libyan National Army and Government of National Accord)
- 2015–present: Yemeni Civil War (2014–present) (Hadi-government forces and Houthis)
- 2020: Second Nagorno-Karabakh War (Azerbaijani Land Forces)
- 2020–2022: Tigray War (Ethiopian government forces and Tigray Defense Forces.)
- 2023–present: Sudanese civil war (2023–present) (Sudanese-government forces and Rapid Support Forces.)
- 2025-present: 2025 Cambodia–Thailand conflict (Used by Royal Cambodian Army.)
- 2025: 2025 Afghanistan–Pakistan conflict (Taliban government)

== Operators and variants ==
The T-55 has been used worldwide by as many as 50 countries and quasi-armies. They have been subject to many improvements throughout their production history and afterwards, and many are still in service today.

Modifications to the T-54/55 series over the years have changed almost every aspect of the vehicle. Initially, Soviet modifications included a better turret shape, improved NBC protection and an improved powerplant. Later, enhanced fire-control equipment and night-vision equipment was added.

Foreign improvements, both in Warsaw Pact nations and elsewhere, have further improved protection, powerplant, and firepower. T-54/55s have been re-armed with improved tank guns, AA machine guns, advanced armour arrays, and technologies, such as laser range finders and computerized fire control systems, that did not exist when the tank was first being built in the early days of the Cold War.

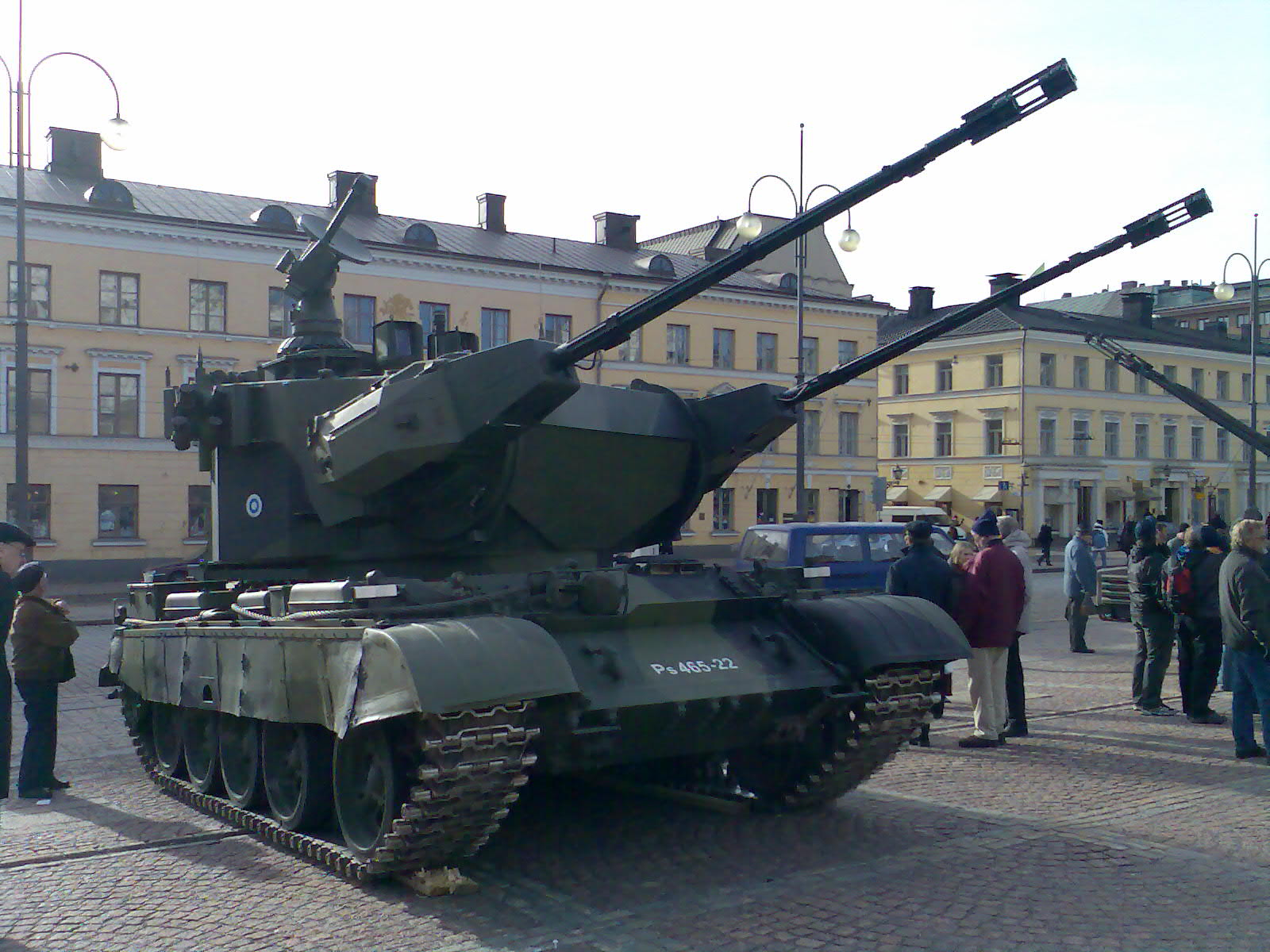
A Finnish T-55-based Marksman self-propelled anti-aircraft gun (SPAAG) vehicle, which is referred to locally as the ItPsv 90.

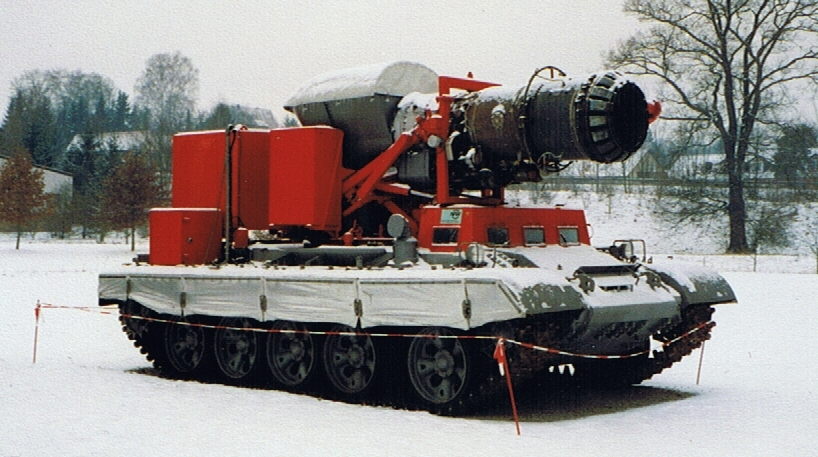
"Hurricane" firefighting vehicle, which uses the engine from a MiG-21 to blow water mist over a fire.

== Museums with T-54/T-55 on display ==
- There is a T-55 captured from Iraqi forces during Operation Desert Storm at USS Alabama Battleship Park, Mobile Alabama.
- There is a T-55 on outdoor display at the Fort Polk Museum, Fort Polk Louisiana, United States.
- The Ontario Regiment Museum has an operational T-54.
- There is a T-54 outside of K-W Surplus in Kitchener, Ontario, Canada
- The Museum of Military Technology "Gryf" in Gdynia, Poland offers rides in a T-55A.
- There is a T-54 at the Tank Museum in Thun, Switzerland.
- A T-55 of the 73 Armoured Regiment of the Indian Army that has seen combat in the Indo-Pak war of 1971 has been installed at Terrier Chowk, Red Fields in the city of Coimbatore.
- There is a T-54AM at the German Tank Museum in Munster, Germany.
- One Czechoslovak made T-55A gifted by Germany after reunification in 1991, as OPFOR familiarization aid is on display at the Etimesgut Tank Museum in Ankara.
- An Iraqi T-55 is on display at the American Heritage Museum in Stow, Massachusetts
- There are multiple T-54/55's at the Bovington Tank Museum, Dorset, UK
- There are T-54/55 and modified Tiran versions at the Yad lashiryon museum in Latrun

== See also ==
- AT-T – (Soviet Union) - tractor based on the T-54 chassis
- Al-Zarrar – (Pakistan)
- Ramses II tank – (Egypt)
- T-54/T-55 operators and variants – (Soviet Union)
- TR-85 – (Romania)
- Type 59 tank – (China)
- Type 59G(BD) Durjoy – (China, Bangladesh)
- Type-72Z Safir-74 – (Iran)

=== Tanks of comparable role, performance and era ===
- Centurion tank – approximate British equivalent
- M48 Patton – approximate American equivalent

== General bibliography ==
- Cockburn, Andrew (1983). The Threat: Inside the Soviet Military Machine. New York: Random House. 3 May 1983 ISBN 0-394-52402-0.
- Dunstan, Simon (1982). Vietnam Tracks: Armor in Battle 1945–75. Osprey Publications. ISBN 0-89141-171-2.
- Foss, Christopher F., ed (2005). Jane's Armour and Artillery 2005–2006, 26th edition. 15 August 2005 ISBN 0-7106-2686-X.
- Gelbart, Marsh (1996). Tanks: Main Battle and Light Tanks. London: Brassey's. ISBN 1-85753-168-X.
- Starry, Gen. Donn A. (1989). Mounted Combat in Vietnam . Washington, D.C.: Vietnam Studies, Department of the Army. First printed in 1978-CMH Pub 90–17.
- Hunnicutt, R. P. Patton: A History of the American Main Battle Tank. ISBN 0-89141-230-1.
- Hunnicutt, R. P. Abrams: A History of the American Main Battle Tank. Volume 2. Presidio Press 1990.
- Hunnicutt, R. P. Sheridan: A History of the American Light Tank Volume 2; 1995, Presidio Press. ISBN 0-89141-462-2.
- Zaloga, Steven J. Modern Soviet Armor: Combat Vehicles of the USSR and Warsaw Pact Today. Prentice Hall, 1979. ISBN 978-0-13-597856-6
- Zaloga, Steven J; Johnson, Hugh (2004). T-54 and T-55 Main Battle Tanks 1944–2004. Oxford: Osprey. ISBN 1-84176-792-1.
- Zaloga, Steven J; Katz, Samuel (1 September 1996). Tank Battles of the Mid-East Wars 1: The Wars of 1948–1973. Concord. ISBN 978-962-361-612-6.
- James Kinnear, Stephen Sewell and Andrey Aksenov, Soviet T-54 Main Battle Tank, General Military series, Osprey Publishing Ltd, Oxford 2018. ISBN 978 1 4728 3330 3
- James Kinnear, Stephen Sewell and Andrey Aksenov, Soviet T-55 Main Battle Tank, General Military series, Osprey Publishing Ltd, Oxford 2019. ISBN 978 1 4728 3855 1
- Anthony Tucker-Jones, Images of War: T–54/55, The Soviet Army's Cold War main battle tank – rare photographs from wartime archives, Pen & Sword Military, Barnsley 2017. ISBN 978 1 47389 109 8
- Krzysztof M. Gaj, Czołg T-55AM i pochodne (T-55AD-1M, T-55AD-2M, T-55AMS), Sowa Sp. z o.o., 2013, ISBN 978-83-936039-3-0
