= Operation Amanda =

UNPROFOR mission during the Bosnian War

Coordinates: 44.879°N 18.426°E

- Part of the Bosnian War
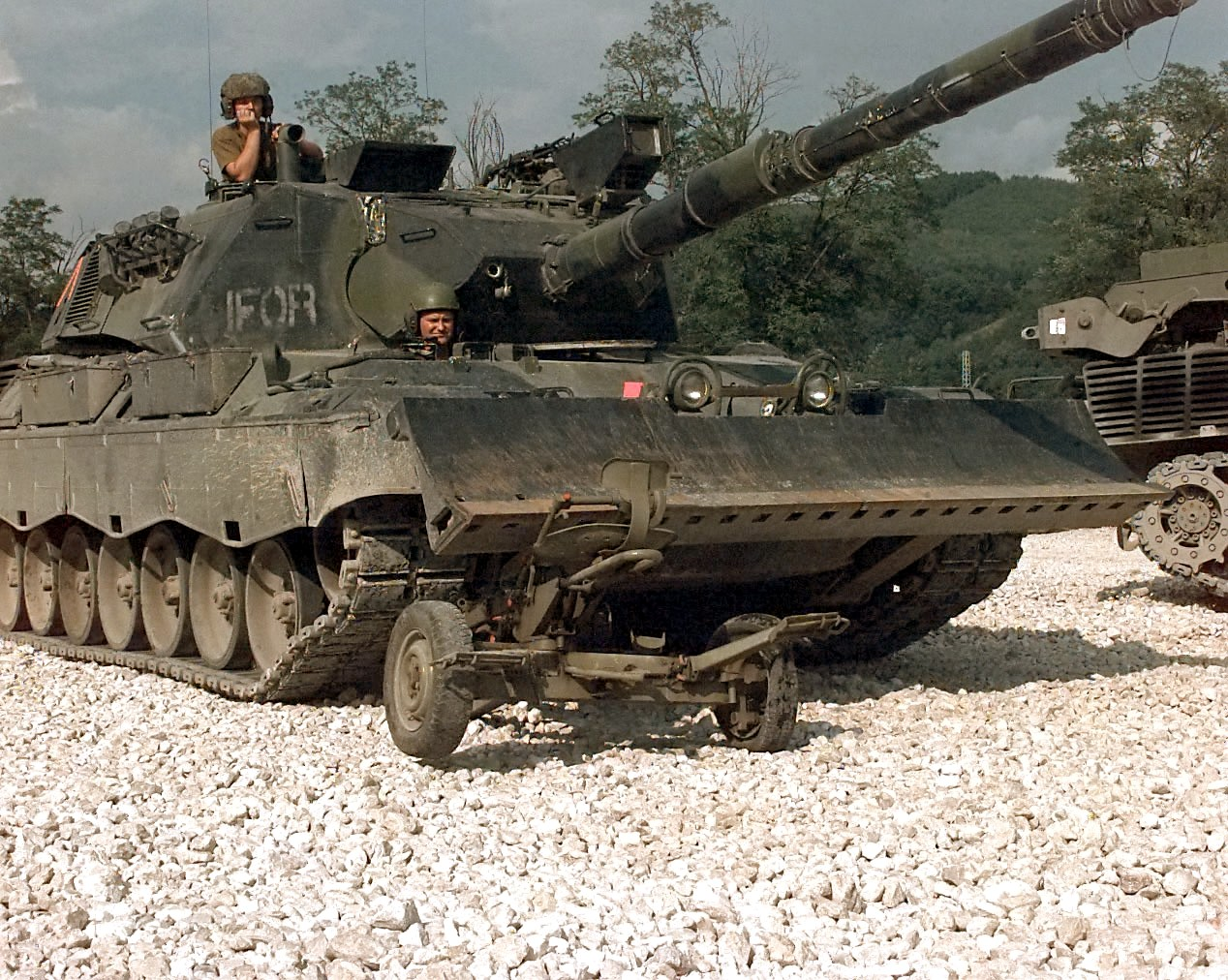
- A Danish IFOR Leopard 1 tank crushing a decommissioned Serbian recoilless gun in 1996
Date	October 25, 1994
Location	near Gradačac, Bosnia and Herzegovina
Result	UN victory

Belligerents
Army of Republika Srpska	UNPROFOR: Danish Defence

Commanders and leaders
Unknown	UNPROFOR: 1.Lt J. Christensen

Strength
1 T-55 tank Recoilless anti-tank guns	UNPROFOR: 3 Leopard 1A5 tanks

Casualties and losses
1 T-55 tank disabled 1 recoilless gun destroyed	UNPROFOR: 1 Leopard tank lightly damaged

Operation Amanda was a United Nations Protection Force (UNPROFOR) mission conducted by Danish peacekeeping troops, with the aim of recovering an observation post, S01, belonging to 9th mech inf coy Nordbat 2 near Gradačac, Bosnia and Herzegovina, on October 25, 1994.

== The engagement ==
The outpost had been used as a temporary observation post (OPT) but Nordbat wanted to turn it into a permanent observation post. Following a series of sniper attacks by Bosnian Serb forces, the staff of Nordbat 2 decided it was time to "show the flag". A task force was put together with one mechanised infantry platoon from the Swedish 9th Mechanised Infantry Company and one tank platoon from the Danish tank company. One Swedish mechanised infantry platoon put on high alert status in order to provide recovery and rescue services. There were also units from the Jordanian Army with artillery localisation radar and medics with armoured ambulances standing by.

While en route to reoccupying the position, the Danish force, composed of three Leopard 1 tanks, was fired on by a T-55 Bosnian Serb tank. After sustaining slight damage to one of the Leopards, the advancing peacekeeping tanks returned fire, destroying one recoilless rifle and putting the T-55 out of action. The Leopards fired a total of twenty-one 105mm rounds.

The outpost was eventually retaken by UNPROFOR. A statement was issued by the UN about the aftermath of the incident, confirming the fate of the Serb T-55:

The best tank-killing weapon is another tank. In the end, air [support] was not needed.

== See also ==
- Operation Bøllebank
