= Brazilian cavalry =

Brazilian Cavalry
- Cavalry branch badge
- Country: Brazil
- Branch: Brazilian Army
- Type: Cavalry
- Patron: Manuel Luís Osório
- Colors: White; Red

The Brazilian cavalry is one of the branches that make up the Brazilian Army. It operates in armored vehicles and, like the infantry, has the role of directly confronting the enemy, but with distinct missions such as reconnaissance and vanguard. It is organized into regiments and squadrons, which are equivalent to the infantry's battalions and companies. Its main types are tank (Leopard 1 and M60), mechanized (with wheeled vehicles — EE-9 Cascavel, EE-11 Urutu and VBTP-MR Guarani), armored (with tracked vehicles — tanks and the M-113) and guard (on horseback). Its troops serve in vehicle crews or as fusiliers on board, who can also fight on foot.

Brazil has had cavalry on horseback since the colonial period, standing out in the South. It had different forms and origins, such as the social elite in the Milícias and Ordenanças, the Regular Regiment of Cavalry of Minas, with a police character, the peon militias on Brazil's southern borders and the Guarani and German Lancers. Officers from Rio Grande do Sul preferred the cavalry branch during the Empire of Brazil era and in the Military School of Realengo (1912–1945), among them the patron of the cavalry Manuel Luís Osório (1808–1879), who distinguished himself during the Paraguayan War. Material difficulties hampered the maintenance of horses during campaigns.

Horses became obsolete in the 20th century world wars, being replaced in industrialized countries by motorized, mechanized and armored forces. In Brazil the process was lengthy, and traditionalists argued that the country's economy and infrastructure were insufficient to sustain full mechanization. In the 50's and 60's mechanized forces coexisted with horses. Only during the 1970s reforms the country's arms industry had developed enough to retire horses. As in some other countries, the change did not extinguish the cavalry branch: its armored vehicles have capabilities and roles similar to those of horses, while the traditions of the cavalrymen remain in part inherited from the horseback period. Since then, its technological level depends on the acquisition of new generations of vehicles. As in neighboring countries, they are not of the latest generation.

Most of the corps are grouped into five brigades, four in the South and one in the Central-West region. Infantry brigades also have some cavalry forces, including specialized squadrons — parachute, airmobile and jungle squadrons. A division-based organization lasted from the 1921 reform until the 1970s, when it gave way to the current brigades, each with, in addition to cavalry, artillery, engineering and logistics forces. Four cavalry brigades are mechanized, with mechanized and armored regiments, and one is armored, with tank regiments and armored infantry battalions.

== Basic concepts ==
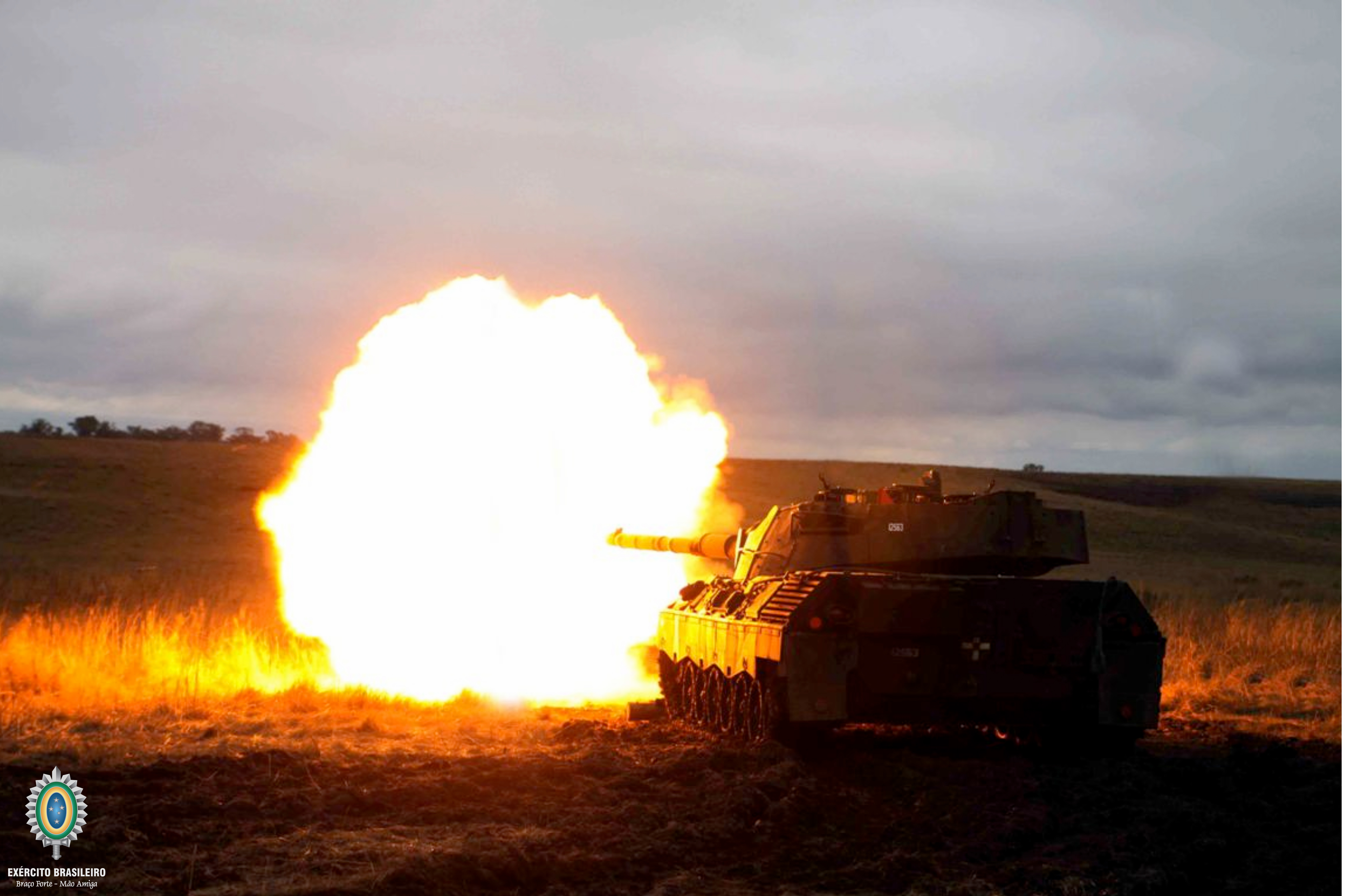
Brazilian Leopard 1 firing

Troops can be classified into infantry, cavalry, artillery, engineering and logistics. The first four are called armas (branches), and the last one is divided into "cadres", "services" and other names. Cavalry and infantry are "base" branches, that is, they directly face the enemy, unlike support branches: artillery and engineering; its units are then called "maneuver" units. The cavalry has its own terminology for its ranks: squadrons and regiments. The former are equivalent to infantry companies and artillery batteries, and the latter to infantry battalions and artillery groups. So-called "mechanized" forces use wheeled armored vehicles, while "armored" forces use tracked armored vehicles.

Cavalry traditionally goes to the front, flank or rear of the main force, with missions such as security (e.g. avoiding ambushes), reconnaissance, connection, penetration, command recovery, withdrawal etc. Many armies still give the designation of cavalry to units with these responsibilities. Despite the technological difference between horses and armor, they share attributes such as mobility. The "shock" power, characteristic of the heavy cavalry, exists today in the tanks and is produced by the combination of mobility, armor and firepower. Added to these characteristics is a communications system capable of coordinating forces dispersed over great distances. In the Brazilian Army, the cavalry is the branch that most represents fire and movement together, and it is the one that operates the heavy means ahead of the offensives.

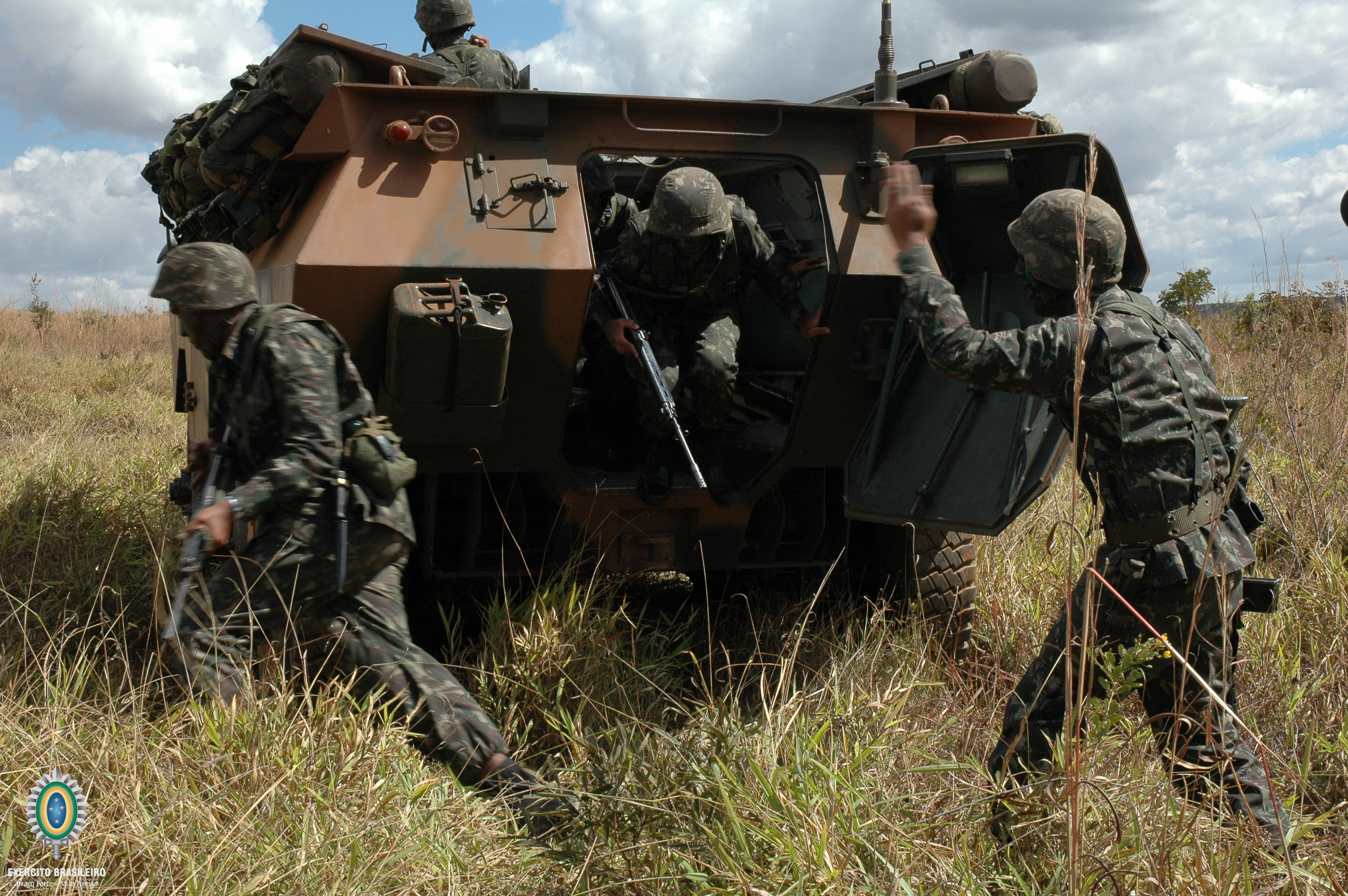
Soldiers disembarking from an EE-11 Urutu

These vehicles' characteristics are also attributed to armored transports such as the Urutu. They carry "mechanized" and "armored" fusiliers that can fight on board the vehicle or disembarked, accompanying it on foot. The fusiliers are a kind of embarked infantry, (Note: Pedrosa 2018 defines armored cavalry fusiliers as "essentially, embarked infantry troops". In mechanized cavalry, the Urutu's function is defined as transporting infantry by Forecast International report on the vehicle in 1998 (archived kink) A mention to the platoon "infantry" with Urutus is made in an American publication in Jacobson, Michael (May–June 1977). «Armor in Desert Shield». Fort Benning, Georgia: US Army Infantry School. Infantry Magazine: 25–27.) just like the ancient dragoons (mounted infantry), who fought on foot or on horseback (i.e., embarked). Analogies with horse-mobile cavalry are also made between tanks and cuirassiers and between lighter armored vehicles and lancers, uhlans and hussars.

The officers of each branch remain in it for the entire career. At the Academia Militar das Agulhas Negras (AMAN) the differentiation occurs when, still as cadets, they are called at the beginning of the 2nd year in order of school classification to choose which branch they will follow, then enrolling in their respective course, such as the Cavalry Course. Those lowest ranked are "compulsed" to fill the remaining positions.

== History ==
=== Horseback period ===
==== Colonial Brazil ====
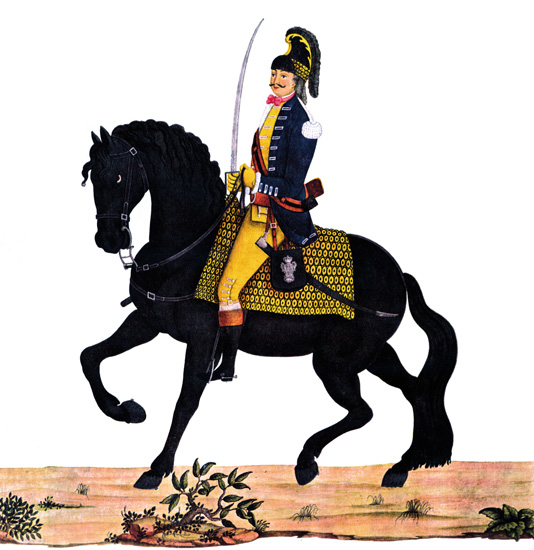
Dragoon in Minas Gerais

The governors-general of the State of Brazil used cavalry forces against amerindians in Bahia and Espírito Santo in the mid-16th century, with the first combat recorded in Porto Grande, near Pirajá, Bahia, on 26 May 1555. The first decisive use was in the war against the Tupiniquins in 1558–1559. However, horses were scarce, expensive and the privilege of a few settlers. In the first two centuries the maintenance of cavalry units was difficult. The existing network of fortifications was much more useful for the defense of the territory than the cavalry.

The post-Restoration Portuguese Empire (1640) had an army divided between Regular Corps, professional and paid, and two categories of territorial and unpaid character, the Auxiliary Corps/Milícias and the Irregular Corps/Ordenanças. Both spent most of their time in their civilian occupations and were divided into units of whites, pardos and freed slaves. Several militia cavalry companies fought the Dutch invasions of Brazil and a squadron participated in the first battle of Guararapes in 1648.

The Ordenanças of horsemen (only Regulars and Auxiliaries used the term "cavalry") had a social elite character in the 16th and 17th centuries. In 18th century Minas Gerais, among the Cavalry Auxiliaries and Ordenanças on horseback, there were no units of pardos or freed slaves. Both gave priority to the richest and noblest men. Regular cavalry emerged in the early 18th century, at first as mounted infantry of a police character. In the gold cycle, several companies of dragoons were formed from 1719 onwards. They were consolidated in 1775 into the Regular Regiment of Cavalry of Minas, funded by the local power — the Captaincy of Minas Gerais itself — and ancestor of the Minas Gerais Military Police.

Throughout the colonial period, cavalry was recruited from different social strata. In colonial Rio Grande do Sul, a militarized, frontier and pastoral society, the cavalry militia was constituted with peons. It was commanded by its ranchers "like the contingents of feudal barons"; they were charismatic leaders who organized the force from their own lands. Mobilized only for war or to fight indigenous peoples, the troops did not follow orthodox military discipline, increasing and decreasing with desertions and admissions. The peons were well adapted to the terrain and riding; they improvised spears and lived in a society where the horse was of great importance. The militias were almost all cavalry, but as in the rest of the country, there was little regular cavalry. In the 18th century, a Dragoon and an Auxiliary regiment appeared in the captaincy. Another southern phenomenon was the recruitment of indigenous people as lancers; these indigenous people were forming nomad societies based on horses. With the transfer of the Portuguese court to Brazil a regiment of Guarani lancers was created in the Missões region.

Then prince regent John of Portugal deemed cavalry necessary to ensure the country's military capabilities, and several regiments were created in the early 19th century. They were armed with 17mm and 19mm Tower or Brown Bess flintlock carbines, 19mm flintlock pistols, spears and sabres.

==== Empire of Brazil ====
Pedro I's personal guard

The Empire of Brazil abandoned the denomination of "dragoons", reorganizing the forces into seven numbered cavalry regiments. These were considered light, but sometimes southern units were considered spearmen for using this weapon, such as the German Lancers. The spear, adopted in 1826, was a novelty inspired by European spearmen and gaucho militiamen. Until then, dragoons only used sabers and carbines and did not take advantage of the shock power of mounted charges. The doctrine in use was Beresford's: offensive role and mounted combat, without dismounting. During the reign of Pedro II, the weapons in use were fulminant carbines, Minié, of various brands and weights; sabres, Colt and Lefaucheux revolvers; Minié pommel pistols and spears.

With their own opinions and experience, cavalrymen were held in low esteem by intellectuals in the capital. There was the saying: "as in the cavalry, fast and badly done". The current patron of the branch, marshal Manuel Luís Osório, served during this period. He was a gaucho (from Rio Grande do Sul) and a typical rancher-commander. Gauchos predominated in the ranks and location of the regiments; they were excellent cavalrymen. The gaucho lancers, nicknamed "centaurs of the pampas", are emblematic of the wars in the south of the country. Horses were trained "wildly" and treated insensitively. Along with the poor quality of Portuguese saddles and food, they weakened over time and each soldier had to take two or three horses to campaign. They could be abandoned on the way. Horse theft was practiced both by Brazilian gauchos and by neighboring Argentines and Uruguayans. In the southern wars from 1825 to 1870, horses were of a low breed standard and climatic, environmental, sanitary, and logistical conditions were appalling. Added to the conditions of the terrain, in many cases cavalrymen fought on foot during the Paraguayan War. Even so, in suitable terrain they still attacked mounted, as in the large cavalry charges performed at the battle of Avay.

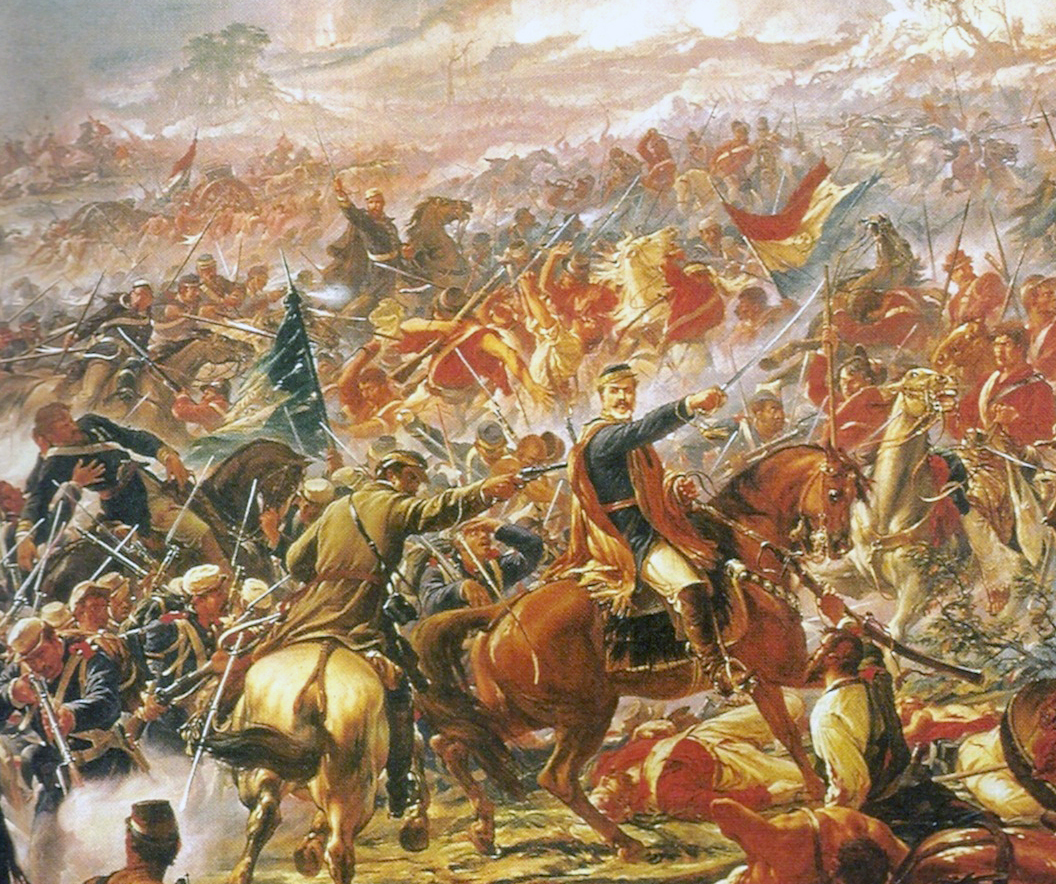
Osório in the Battle of Avay

It was in the Paraguayan campaign that the gaucho lancers reached their peak, and at the same time, the use of spears went into decline. The regiments, in the French manner, had a squadron of dragoons with carbines and the rest of lancers. Under the command of the Duke of Caxias the proportion of lancers dropped from 3/4 to 2/3, but failures with new firearms in general led to more primitive tactics: in the battle of Avay general Osório was one of the last to defeat infantry squares in a "cold iron" charge, with only sabres and spears. After 1869, when command of the Imperial Brazilian Army was given to the Count of Eu, firearms were once again valued. Carbine squadrons were separated from lancers and grouped into ad hoc units. They had great success with the modern Spencer carbine. After the war the infantry lost the distinction between caçadores and fusileiros. The cavalry, following the experience and observing what happened in Europe, could have given equal preparation to shock action and dismounted combat, but this did not consolidate, returning to the mixed configuration.

Cavalry Regiments of the Imperial Brazilian Army
1824		1889
Old unit	New name	1889
1st Cavalry Regiment of the Army	1st CR (Rio de Janeiro)	1st CR (Rio de Janeiro) 2nd CR (Jaguarão) 3rd CR (São Borja) 4th CR (Livramento) 5th CR (Bagé) 6th CR (Santa Vitória do Palmar) 7th CR (Nioaque) 8th CR (Curitiba) 9th CR (Ouro Preto) 10th CR (São Paulo)
Line Cavalry Regiment of Minas Gerais	2nd CR (Ouro Preto)	1st CR (Rio de Janeiro) 2nd CR (Jaguarão) 3rd CR (São Borja) 4th CR (Livramento) 5th CR (Bagé) 6th CR (Santa Vitória do Palmar) 7th CR (Nioaque) 8th CR (Curitiba) 9th CR (Ouro Preto) 10th CR (São Paulo)
São Paulo Legion Cavalry City of São Paulo Squadron	3rd CR (São Paulo)	1st CR (Rio de Janeiro) 2nd CR (Jaguarão) 3rd CR (São Borja) 4th CR (Livramento) 5th CR (Bagé) 6th CR (Santa Vitória do Palmar) 7th CR (Nioaque) 8th CR (Curitiba) 9th CR (Ouro Preto) 10th CR (São Paulo)
Volunteer Squadron of São Pedro	4th CR (Jaguarão)	1st CR (Rio de Janeiro) 2nd CR (Jaguarão) 3rd CR (São Borja) 4th CR (Livramento) 5th CR (Bagé) 6th CR (Santa Vitória do Palmar) 7th CR (Nioaque) 8th CR (Curitiba) 9th CR (Ouro Preto) 10th CR (São Paulo)
Dragoon Regiment of Rio Pardo	5th CR (Rio Pardo)	1st CR (Rio de Janeiro) 2nd CR (Jaguarão) 3rd CR (São Borja) 4th CR (Livramento) 5th CR (Bagé) 6th CR (Santa Vitória do Palmar) 7th CR (Nioaque) 8th CR (Curitiba) 9th CR (Ouro Preto) 10th CR (São Paulo)
Dragoon Regiment of Montevideo	6th CR (Montevideo)	1st CR (Rio de Janeiro) 2nd CR (Jaguarão) 3rd CR (São Borja) 4th CR (Livramento) 5th CR (Bagé) 6th CR (Santa Vitória do Palmar) 7th CR (Nioaque) 8th CR (Curitiba) 9th CR (Ouro Preto) 10th CR (São Paulo)
Dragoon Regiment of the Union	7th CR (Paysandú)	1st CR (Rio de Janeiro) 2nd CR (Jaguarão) 3rd CR (São Borja) 4th CR (Livramento) 5th CR (Bagé) 6th CR (Santa Vitória do Palmar) 7th CR (Nioaque) 8th CR (Curitiba) 9th CR (Ouro Preto) 10th CR (São Paulo)

==== Republican period ====
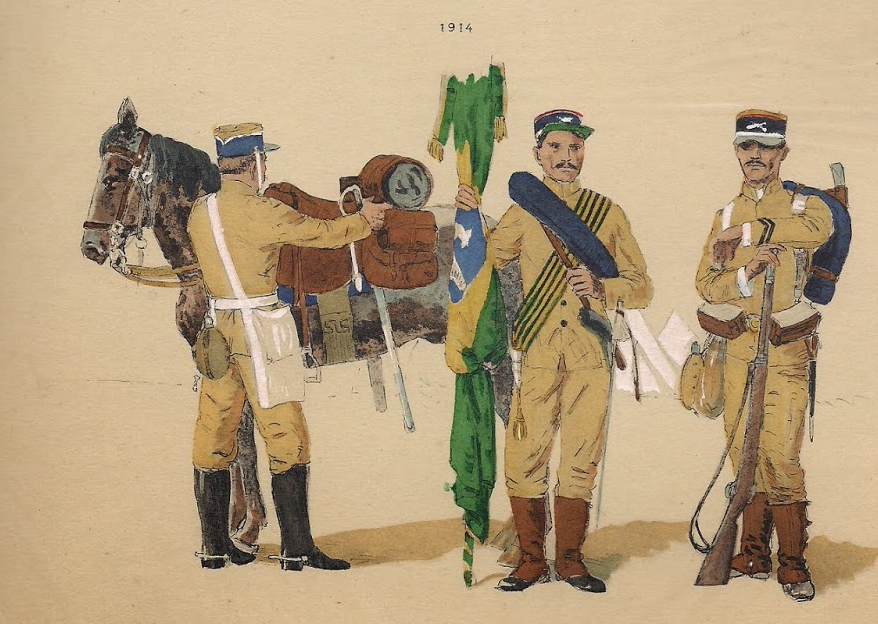
Cavalry in 1914

The Rio Grande do Sul preference for cavalry remained at the Military School of Realengo, the predecessor of AMAN, where officers were trained after 1913. Cadets with better grades chose their branch at the end of the 2nd year. Cavalry was the third most disputed, behind Artillery and Engineering (in ascending order). The Infantry typically took the lowest grade students. Many northeastern cadets joined the southerners under José Pessoa (1930–1934), a cavalryman from Paraíba.

Lancers were still important in the Federalist Revolution (1893–1895), but in that decade they could be easily hit at long range. The use of the spear was minimal in the following decades. The Army even acquired the Ehrardt spear in 1908, only adopting firearms for the entire troop in 1917. In 1910, a presidential decree provided for a Veterinary School and a Veterinary Staff in the Army Health Corps, thus responding to the unhealthy conditions observed in the campaigns over the previous century. At the time of Pandiá Calogeras' tenure at the Ministry of War (1919–1922), the Army's material shortcomings were also felt in the cavalry. Many soldiers were occupied with the creation, reproduction and treatment of horses to the detriment of instruction, making large exercises in the field extremely rare. With the high rate of loss of horses in a war, the minister speculated that in a fortnight the cavalry would be fighting on foot.

One of the iconic moments of the Revolution of 1930 was when the gaucho revolutionaries tied their horses to the obelisk on Rio Branco Avenue, in Rio de Janeiro, representing their triumph over the ruling power in the capital. The obelisk, an icon of central power, was reduced to "a mere platform to tie up horses", symbols of Rio Grande do Sul.

Animal traction was not exclusive to cavalry, being widely used by other branches. The artillery, for example, moved its guns in yoke of oxen, which was easily observable until the late 1930s. In 1939–1940, at the beginning of World War II, the Army had a predicted strength of 36,383 horses, with 22,810 actually existing, dispersed throughout the military regions. This required stud farms, remounts, breeding and veterinary supplies warehouses, a hospital, infirmaries, isolation rooms, pharmacies, blacksmiths, forage cultivation and animal purchases. The poor state of the barracks was noted by general José Pessoa when he was appointed inspector of the Cavalry in 1939. In his assessment, the Argentine cavalry would be superior to the Brazilian cavalry during a war. The problem was broader, in the country's equine farming, and thus also under the jurisdiction of the Ministry of Agriculture. In 1958 the individual armaments of a squadron of horseback cavalry riflemen were swords, carbines, saber-daggers, semi-automatic rifles, pistols, revolvers, submachine guns, and hand and rifle grenades. The collective weapons were the Madsen 1935-F submachine gun, the 60 mm mortar and rocket launchers.

=== Mechanization (1938–1986) ===
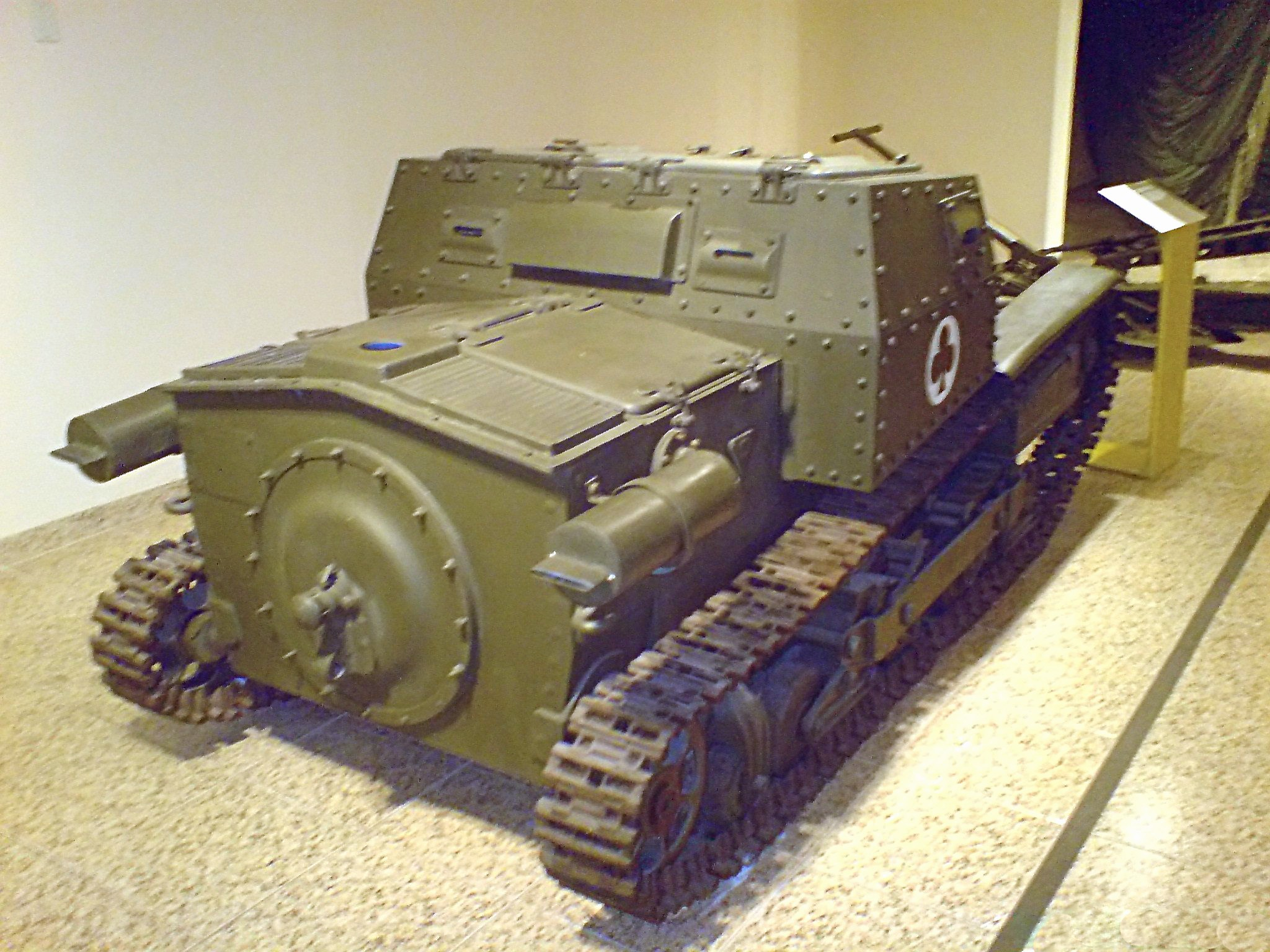
L3/35 tankette

The two world wars highlighted the obsolescence of the horse on the battlefield and its domination by mechanized vehicles. Two technological advances were in progress, motorization and mechanization, which can be respectively defined as the adoption of transport materials, such as trucks and tractors, and combat materials, such as the tank and armored vehicles. For the cavalry, mechanization was a radical change that retired its main instrument, the horse. After 1940, the branch faced extinction, but it had an alternative: to embrace mechanization, recognizing the tank as the horse's successor and continuing its former armor, shock and mobility capabilities. The world military powers replaced horse cavalry with mechanized forces, although some cavalry units retained their designations. The "cavalry" of the following decades was based on cutting-edge technology. However, horses continued to be used in peripheral countries.

Brazilian mechanization began with the adoption of the Renault FT-17 by the Companhia de Carros de Assalto (1921–1932). It was attached to the 1st Infantry Division and served to support the infantry, according to the French doctrine at the time. At the beginning of the interwar period, the tank's role was open, appearing with infantry and even artillery; some argued that it should form a branch of its own. Years later and until 1970, the same French concept appeared in the Light Tank Battalions, which belonged to the infantry.

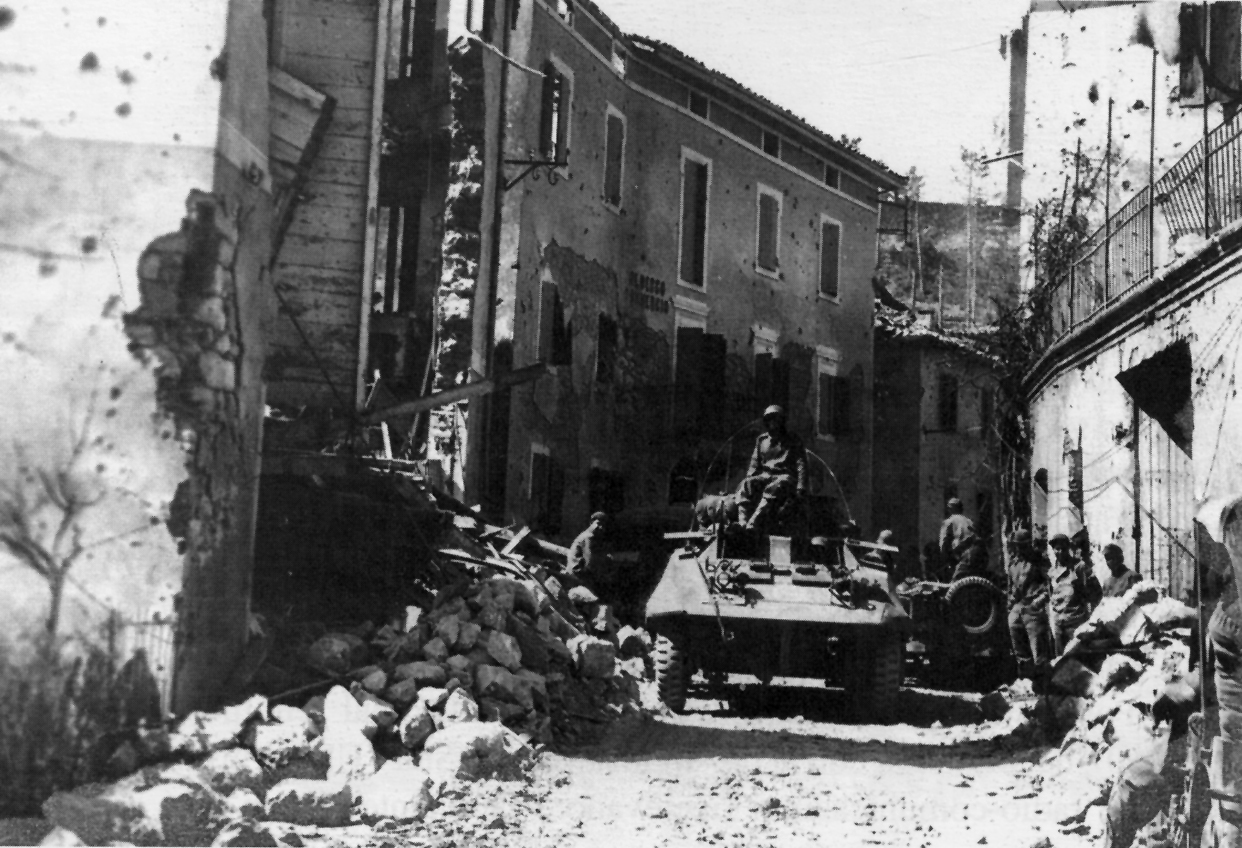
Brazilian M8 Greyhound in the Italian campaign (1945)

The next steps were the Moto-Mechanization Section of the General Staff of the Army and the creation of the Squadron of Auto-Machine Guns of Reconnaissance in 1938, equipped with the Italian Fiat Ansaldo L3/35 tankette and belonging to the cavalry. During World War II, from 1941 to 1942 Brazil received a lot of American mechanized material through Lend-Lease. The flow was resumed in 1952 with the signing of the Brazil-United States Military Agreement. The cavalry's participation in the Brazilian Expeditionary Force consisted of a squadron equipped with jeeps and M8 Greyhound armored vehicles. The entry of hundreds of WWII American tanks — M3 Stuarts, M3 Lees, M4 Shermans, M8 Greyhounds and M3 Scout Cars, supplemented in the 1960s with the M41 Walker Bulldog light tank from the 1950s, allowed the creation of a Motomechanized Division (1943), converted into an Armored Division nucleus (1946) and raised to a full division in 1957.

Armored vehicles coexisted with horse cavalry: in 1960, out of 27 cavalry regiments, 17 were on horseback. The 1946 Law on the Organization of Cadres and Effectives left only horse and motorized forces in the cavalry branch, classifying mechanized units as "armored troops", while the 1957 decree included them in the cavalry. There was the threat of the creation of an independent armored branch, as occurred in Germany and the United States.

Also at stake were the traditions of the branch, the careers of cavalrymen and veterinarians, and the future of the horses. A faction of officers who defended the tradition wanted its permanence, even if they partially admitted motomechanization. The debate had been raging since World War II. The blitzkrieg demonstrated the value of armor, while horse supporters used the feats of the Red Army's cavalry to their advantage. Until the 1960s, traditionalists argued on the basis of the inferior mobility and versatility of mechanized forces in difficult terrain and rainy weather, as well as the material infeasibility of sustaining them. The material argument was:

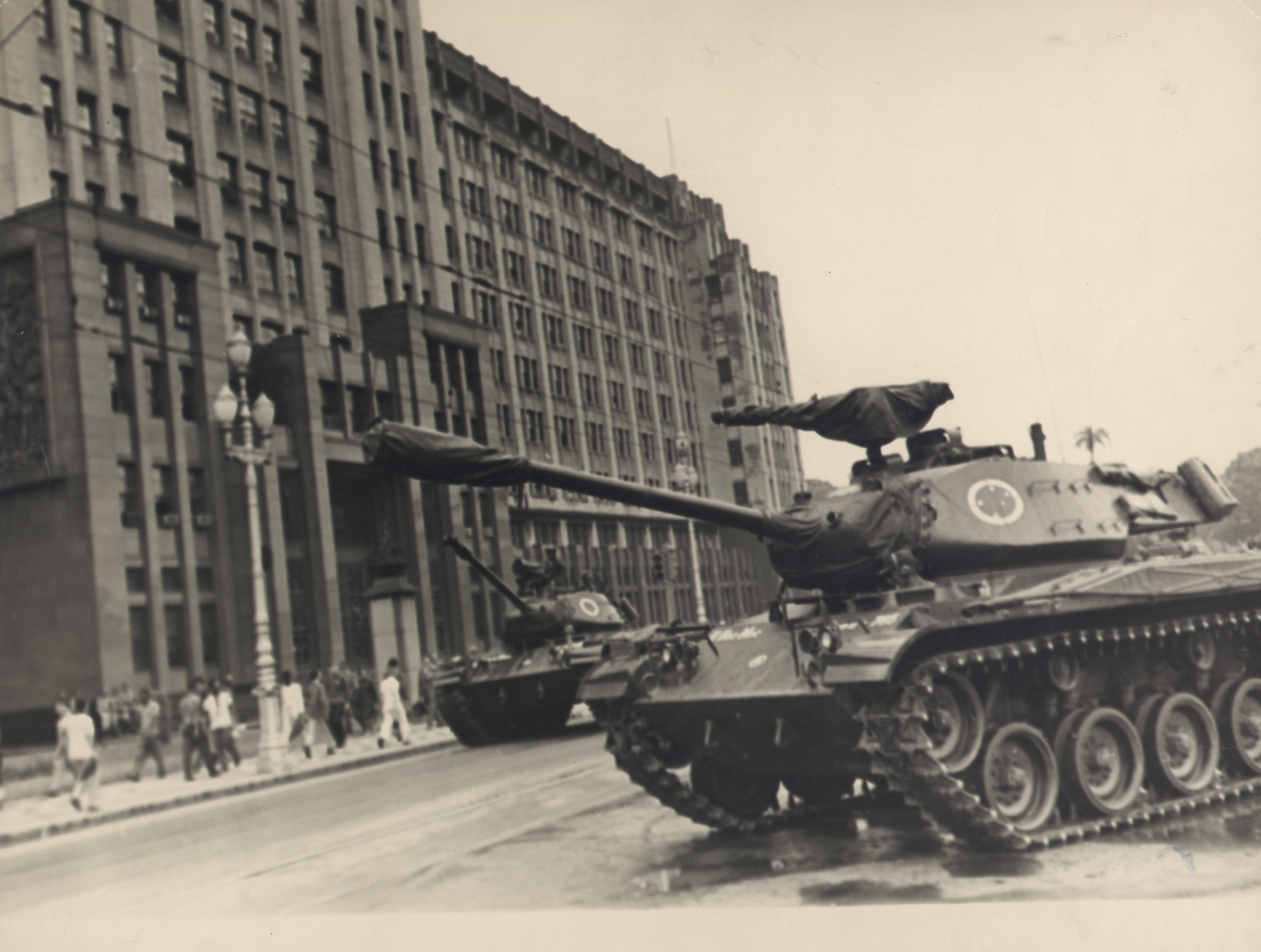
M41 light tanks in front of the Duque de Caxias Palace in the 1964 coup

One day, the vertiginous progress of our country will lead us to carry out, with mechanized vehicles, the traditional missions that Osório and Andrade Neves did on horseback. However, this will only be possible when the Brazilian panorama changes through the transformation of the physical environment by man, that is, when our engines, powered by our oil, travel along real roads to any point in the country. Only then can we think of suppressing the horse.

— General Almério de Castro Neves, A Cavalaria Hipomóvel Brasileira na Época Atual, (A Defesa Nacional, No. 599, 1965)

There is mention of a military movement on horseback from Quaraí, in southwestern Rio Grande do Sul, to the Harmonia region during the 1964 coup d'état, but what happened in the 1961 Legality Campaign, the 1964 coup, the 1965 Três Passos Guerrilla and combating contraband was motorized transport, even if in requisitioned civilian vehicles. Motorization and mechanization took place in the armies of neighboring countries and were widespread in the Korean and Vietnam wars. Over the years reluctant officers were gradually replaced by new generations open to mechanization.

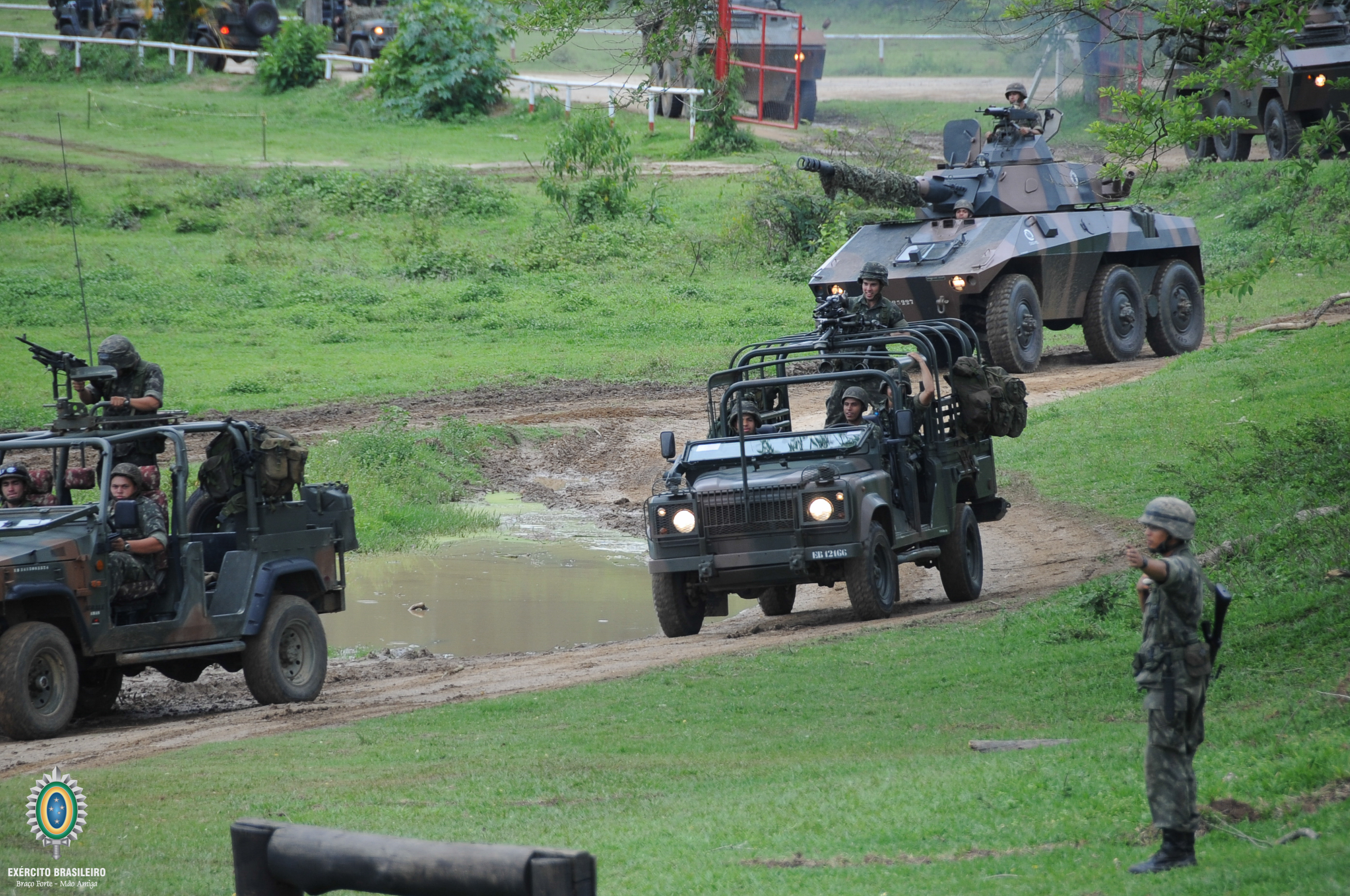
EE-9 Cascavel and jeeps

At the same time, the arguments against mechanization were deflated by the "vertiginous progress" of the Brazilian economy. In the 60s and 70s, local automobile and war industries and the Army's research projects made it possible to nationalize most of the unarmored vehicles, modernize the American armored vehicles in use and manufacture armored vehicles on wheels: the EE-9 Cascavel and EE-11 Urutu from Engesa, respectively for reconnaissance and transport. National vehicles finally equipped the cavalry. Likewise, infantry was also motorized and mechanized. By 1973, mechanization had transformed most regiments, reaching the last ones in Mato Grosso do Sul in 1985–1986. (Note: 10 and 11 on 8 December 1985 and 17 on 16 October 1986. See AHEx 2020, pp. 166-167 and 170.) Late mechanization was a Latin American trend; Mexico and Chile also had horse cavalry in the 1980s.

In the new cavalry platoons, Cascavel and Urutu served together, complementing each other. Their similarity of parts facilitated logistics and maintenance. The horses were kept in three guard regiments, of historical value, and in some schools. The designation of "cavalry" was merely added with adjectives such as "mechanized" and "armored". Training of cavalry officers continued, as did reconnaissance and vanguard duties. In this way the tradition survived in part, it was reconciled with modernization and the branch continued to exist.

=== Modernizations (1979–) ===
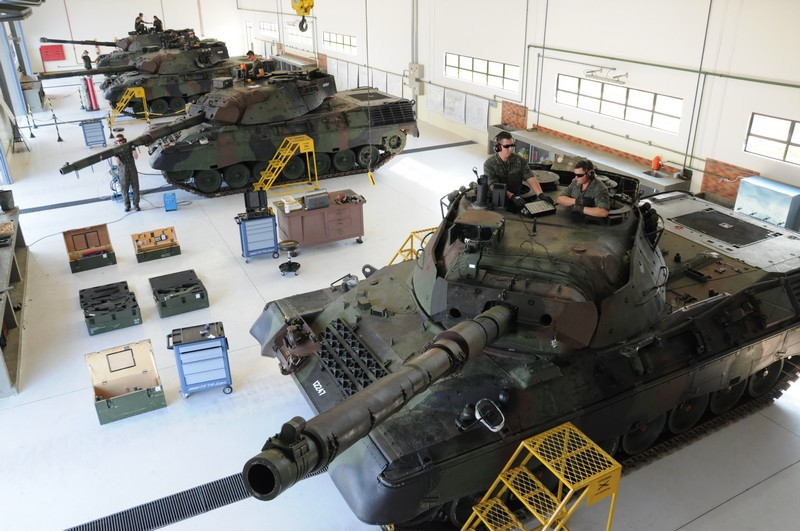
Leopard 1

After mechanization, a new and equally great opportunity arose with helicopters. Carrying soldiers and having great mobility and maneuverability, they were employed by the Americans in Vietnam as "air cavalry". Some Brazilian cavalrymen saw it as the next evolution after armored cavalry, but the helicopter units that the Army created from 1986 onwards did not belong to the cavalry. That role fell to Army Aviation and airmobile infantry.

The local industry accumulated experience modernizing American vehicles and in 1979 it began the development of a national tank, the Tamoyo, in response to the Tanque Argentino Mediano. Thouguh not a cutting-edge technology, it was suited to national limitations. To accompany it came the Charrua APC as a successor for the M-113. The Tamoyo had a more advanced alternative, aimed at the international market, the EE-T1 Osório. None of the three vehicles were purchased and the local war industry went into crisis in the 1990s.

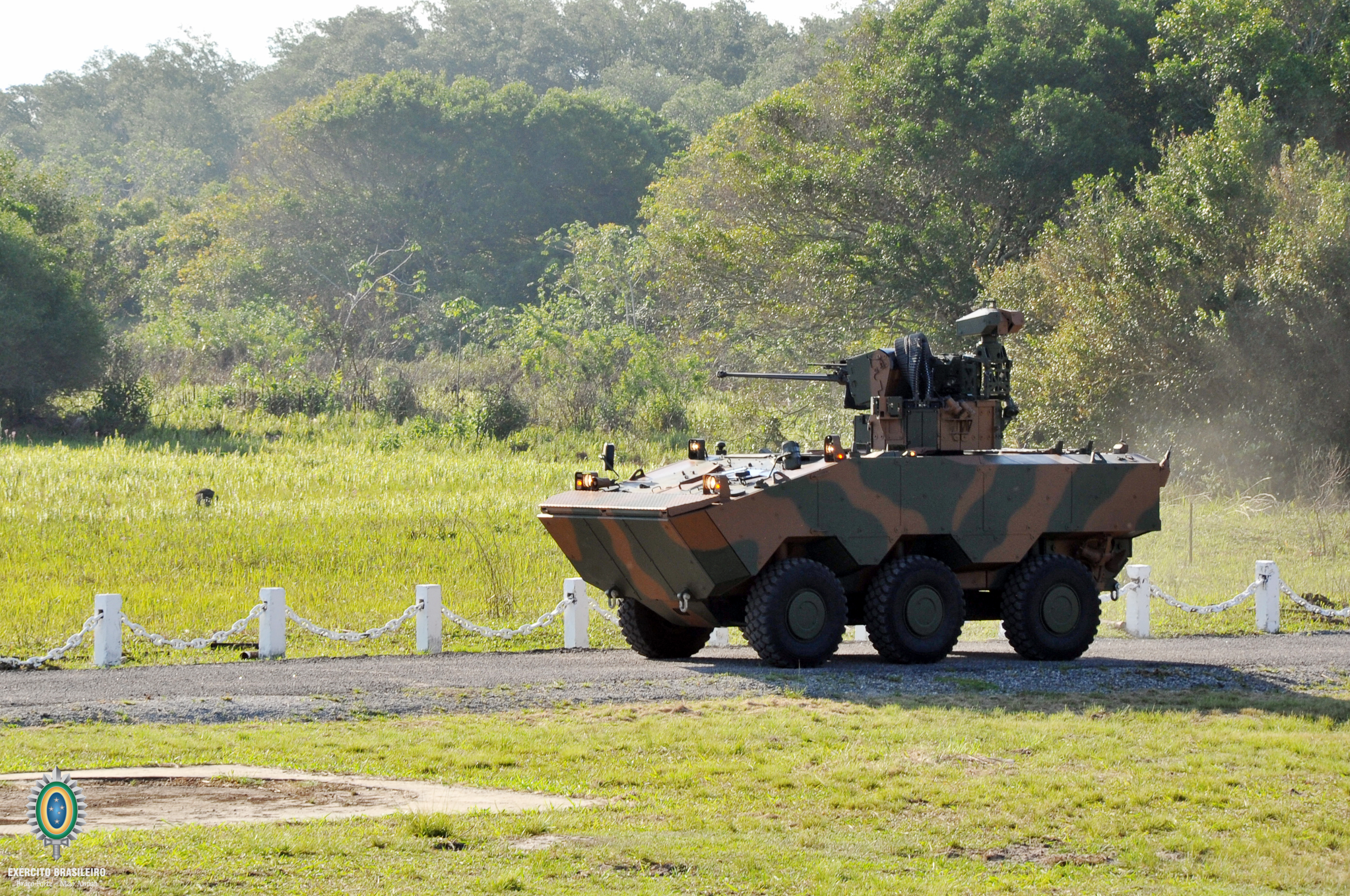
Guarani armored vehicle

The "Delta Doctrine" for a conventional war outside the Amazon, one of the hypotheses adopted by the Army in 1996, prioritized armored and mechanized forces. By then, these forces were outdated both infantry and cavalry. In the same year, the Armored Instruction Center was founded to prepare the human resources (sergeants and officers) of the armored troops. As the M41 was already old, the only option was to import new tanks. In the late 90's Brazil bought the M60 A3 TTS and the Leopard 1A1. Without a proper import of maintenance parts for the Leopard, in 2009–2010 the first batches of a better version arrived, the Leopard 1A5. They are much more advanced tanks than the M41 and have led to the expansion of logistical capabilities. However, maintenance, unlike acquisition, is expensive, there is no technology transfer and the models are outdated. The Tamoyo, M60 and Leopard 1 are 2nd generation, while the Osório and 80's and 90's contemporaries like the M1 Abrams and Leopard 2 are 3rd generation.

Scouts, lighter elements of mechanized cavalry, rely on jeeps, while more modern armies would use light armour. Its electro-optronic material was assessed as obsolete in 2020. Cascavel and Urutu served more than 25–40 years after production, becoming technologically outdated; thus, in 1998 the Army began its planning for a new family of wheeled tanks. The Urutu was replaced by the new domestically produced VBTP-MR Guarani in 2014–2022, leaving only five units in service. The Guarani also serves the new mechanized infantry. The Cascavel had its successor chosen in 2022: the Centauro II tank destroyer with a 120mm cannon, in a gradual replacement over 15 years. The purchase was challenged in court on budgetary grounds. The M-113 remains as the tracked transport of armored cavalry, while other armies would use an infantry fighting vehicle such as the Bradley in its place. The maintenance contract for the Leopard 1A5 BR expires in 2027, requiring a replacement in the future. In the conflicts of the 2020s, such as the Second Nagorno-Karabakh War and the Russian invasion of Ukraine, more modern tanks than the Brazilian Leopard 1, but used with tactical errors, suffered heavy casualties against anti-tank weapons and drones.

== Traditions ==
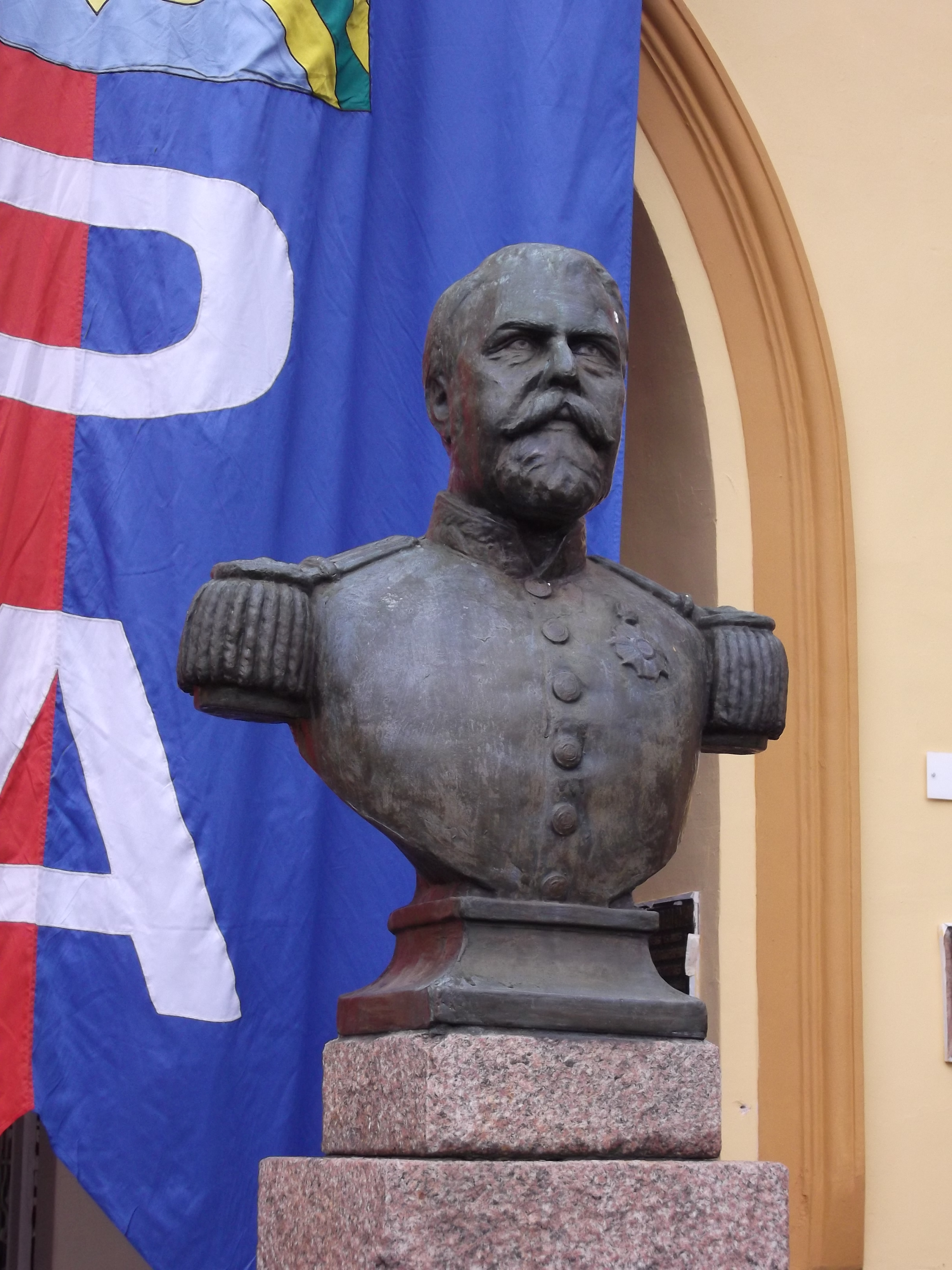
Bust of Osório

General José Pessoa considered cavalry "the branch par excellence of tradition". There is the belief in the "nobility" of the Brazilian Cavalry, which brings it closer to the medieval one, however, defined not by the feudal elite character of its predecessor but by certain behavioral traits ("elegance, loyalty and audacity"). An anthropological survey with AMAN cadets in the late 1980s identified as values attributed to cavalry "speed, combativeness, courage, flexibility, determination, detachment, willingness to overcome obstacles, 'no frills'". The soldiers of the other branches have negative stereotypes of the cavalrymen as "brutes and troublemakers" and the spirit of the branch as "fast and badly done".

Another link to the medieval past is the spur-issuing initiation ritual. Traditions were centered on the horse as an instrument of war and included riding, a close bond between cavalryman and his mount, and appropriate weaponry. Active duty officers had the right to keep a private horse on Army facilities. The centuries-old stories of the regiments and songs are also part of the tradition. A tradition that emerged with mechanization is the use of the black berets, traditional in armored forces around the world. It dates from the British Army in 1924 and is suitable for a tank crew, not obstructing the view in the narrow visors or exposing oil stains. In Brazil it was first adopted in Bagé in 1968.

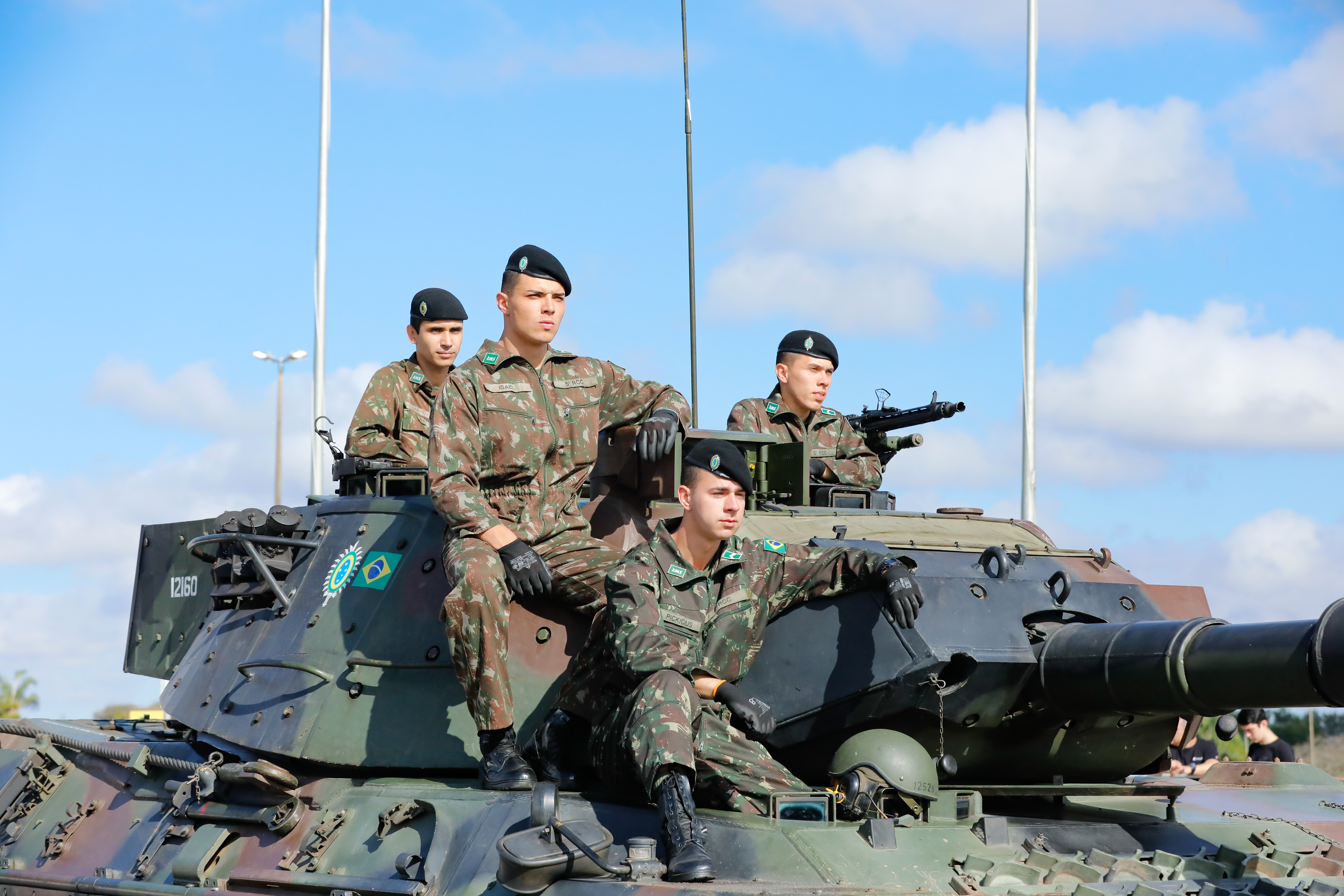
Leopard 1 crewmen with the black beret

The patron saint is Saint George, chosen in the mid-20th century. Sometimes represented "on horseback, with a flaming spear, attacking and defeating a dragon", he is associated with martial values since the Middle Ages and venerated by Brazilian military in general, as in the cavalry of the Rio de Janeiro Military Police. The branch's symbol was, during the Empire of Brazil, the number of the regiment between two dragons similar to those of the House of Braganza. In the 1880s, badges with two crossed swords appeared. With the abandonment of monarchical symbology after the proclamation of the republic in 1889, it became two crossed spears with pennants.

The patron, marshal Manuel Luís Osório, the Marquis of Herval (1808–1879), led the Allied forces to victory at the battle of Tuyutí on 24 May 1866 during the Paraguayan War. In the following decades he became a prestigious figure in the Army as a whole, receiving greater reverence than Luís Alves de Lima e Silva, the Duke of Caxias. The primacy of Caxias, today the Army's patron, was built in the 1920s and 1930s. Tenentism and the repeated insurrections of the troops led the military leaders of the end of the Old Republic and the Vargas Era to promote Caxias' figure, associated with the struggles for national unity. They sought to value a legalistic and apolitical profile that would restore the Army's unity. From the 1940s onwards, Osório took on the position of patron of the Cavalry. Before consolidating this position, it was attributed to Joaquim de Andrade Neves, a contemporary of Osório, in the book Grandes soldados do Brasil.

The word "cavalry" is attributed by Brazilian cavalrymen, including in official publications, to Sanskrit akva. This etymology was introduced in 1942 by lieutenant colonel Arthur Carnaúba based on a book by captain Serpa Soares, of the Portuguese Army. According to Soares, the word originally meant combat in advantage of position, in war chariots and later on the back of mounts. In Latin, it would have originated the terms aequa and aequus, for horses. Thus, cavalry did not come from the horse, justifying the continuity of the term for a mechanized weapon. However, the proposed etymology has no solid theoretical basis; it is not necessarily wrong, but it lacks in-depth studies. Spanish, Italian, and French dictionaries consider the word to be derived from the word for horse. (Note: An etymological discussion is in Fiske, John (1911). Excursions of an evolutionist (PDF). Boston and New York: Houghton Mifflington.. pp. 122-125. The author associates the word with horses from Sanskrit.)

== Organization ==
Cavalry regiments are classified into tank, armored with tanks and other armored vehicles on tracks, mechanized with wheeled armored vehicles or guard with horses. There are specialized squadrons in the parachute, airmobile and jungle brigades. Brigades are either armored or mechanized, the Armored Cavalry Brigade being identical to the Armored Infantry Brigade.

=== Regiments ===
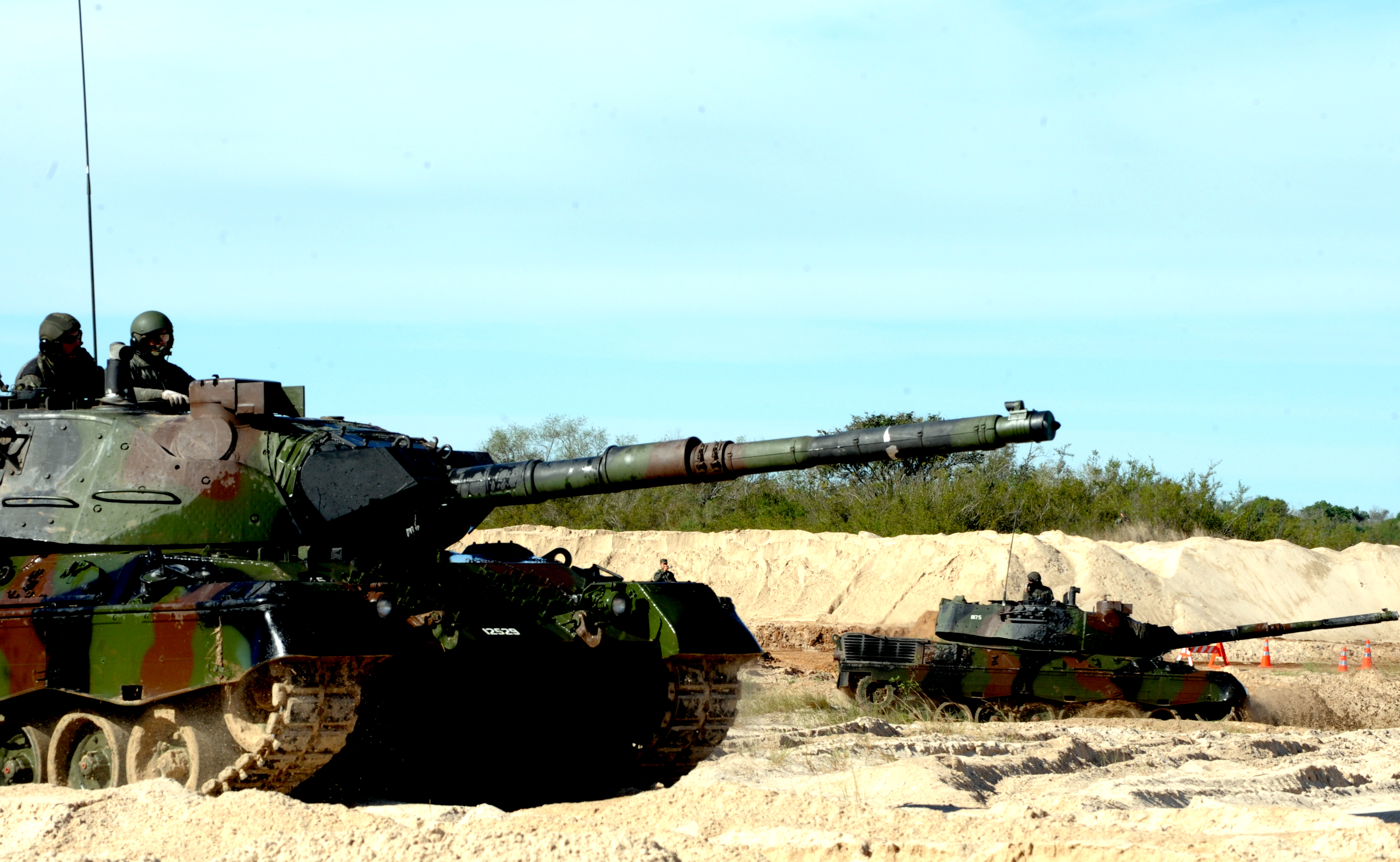
Leopard 1 tank

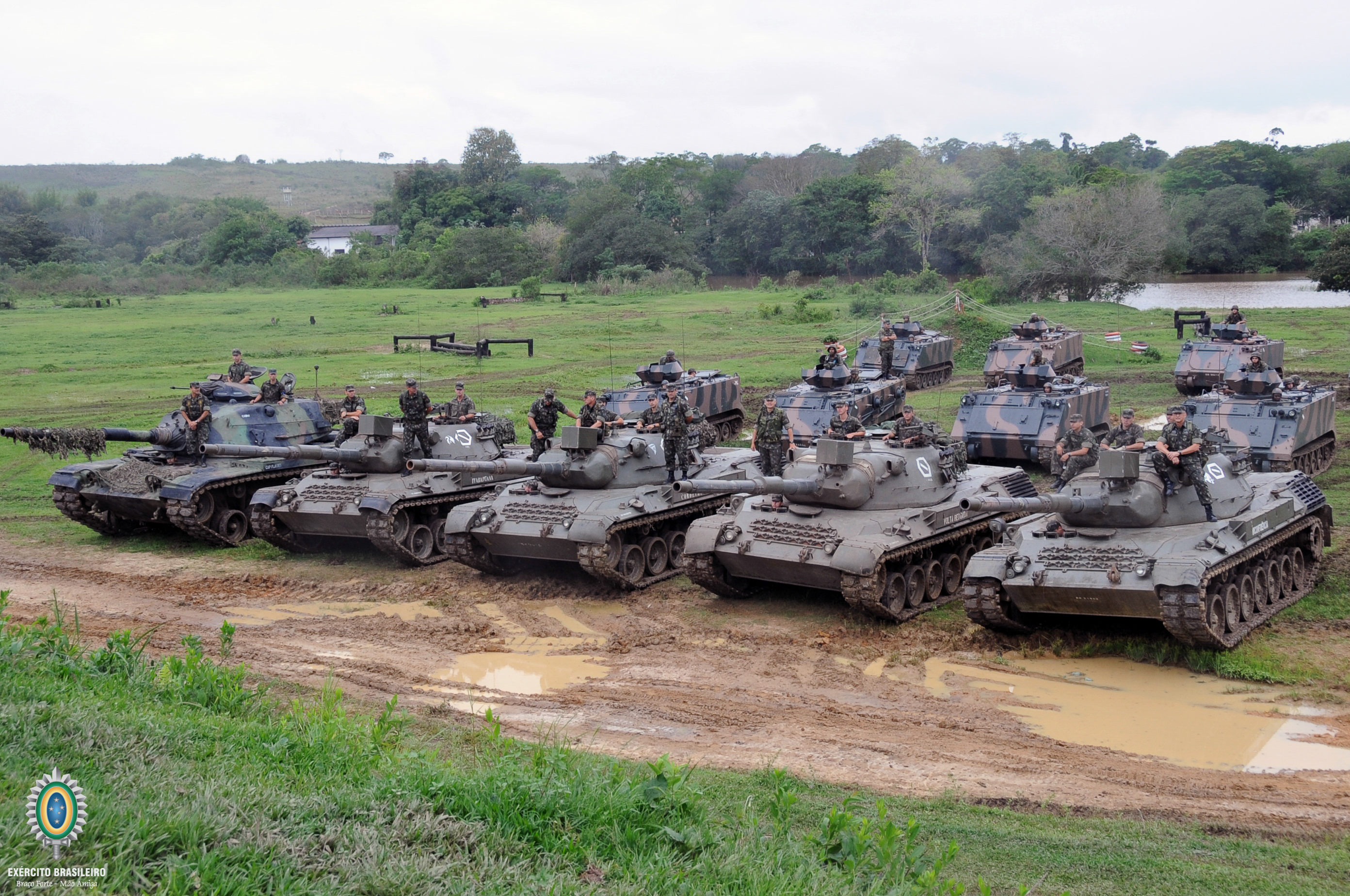
Armored cavalry: M60, Leopard 1's and M-113's

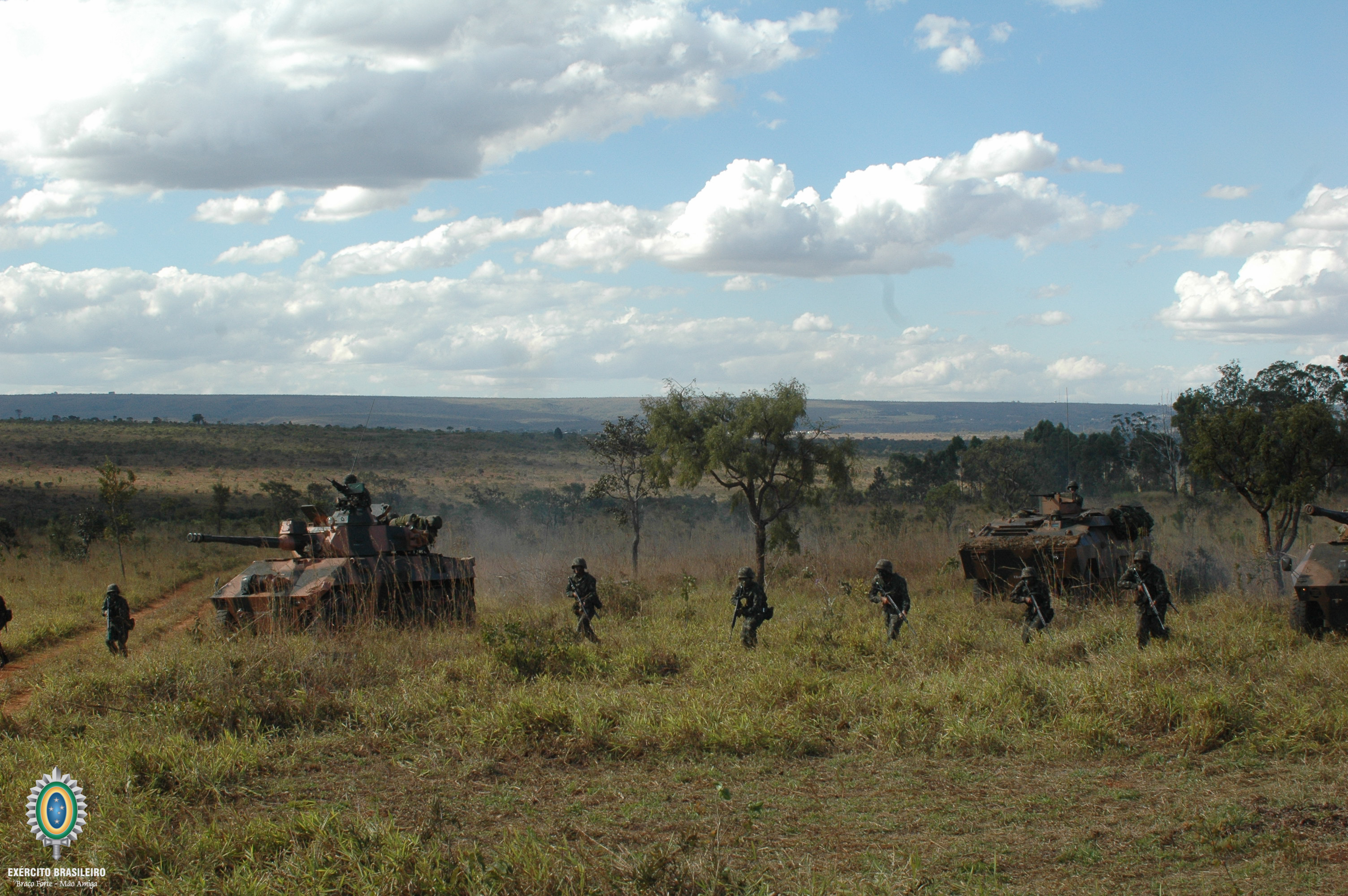
Mechanized cavalry: Cascavel's and disembarked soldiers from an Urutu

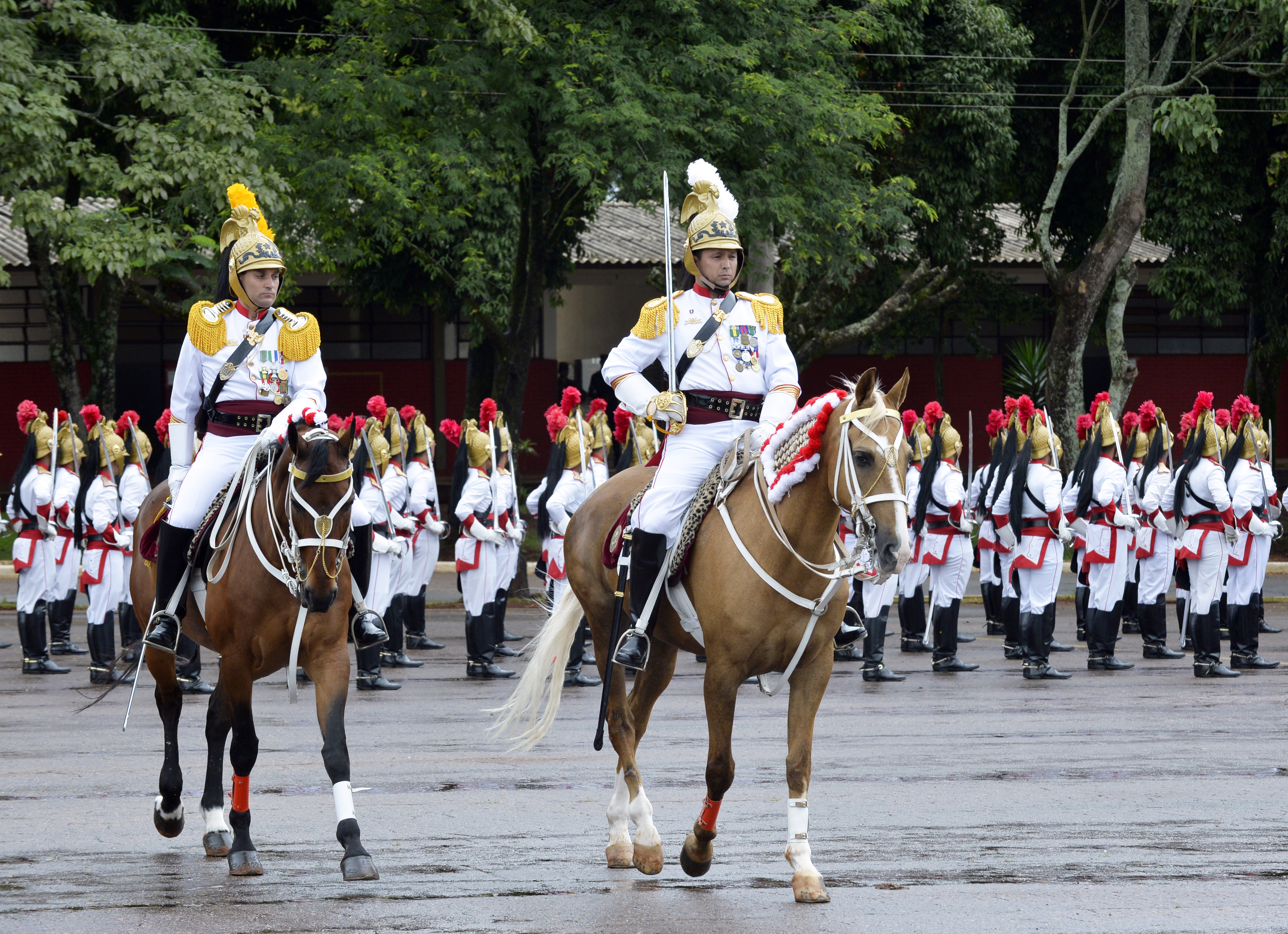
Guard cavalry

The 1915 Cavalry Regiment, battalion sized following Portuguese tradition, was organized into an HQ and four sabre squadrons, reduced to three in 1928 and renamed Mounted Rifle Squadrons ( "fuzileiros") in 1943. New types of squadrons appeared in 1932 (machine guns) and 1943 (mortars and antitank guns). (Note: EsAO, s/d (2). Each squadron originally had four platoons of two fireteams. In 1921 a platoon of light machine guns was added and the platoons reorganized based on a combat group (GC) and two squadrons of scouts.)

Mechanization generated new types of units in the 1940s. Mounted infantry became the Motorized Cavalry Regiments (RCM), and Tank Battalions (BCC) and Mechanized Reconnaissance Squadrons and Regiments (Esqd or R Rec Mec) were created. (Note: The Motorized Cavalry had as an intermediate stage the Transported Cavalry Regiment. Mechanized Reconnaissance had as brief predecessors the Motomechanized Wing, Auto-Machine Gun Cavalry Regiment and Motomechanized Regiment.Junqueira 1967, pp. 72-76.) The RCM was effectively motorized infantry. Mechanized Reconnaissance used lighter armored vehicles and, in addition to reconnaissance, also carried out offensive, defensive and security missions. The name was inappropriately influenced by American doctrine. The BCC had medium armor. Its name was also an impropriety, as what the Americans called a "battalion", the Brazilian cavalry traditionally called a "regiment". A heavy armored battalion was also planned, which, however, did not come into being.

The reforms of the 1970s completed the mechanization process. The former categories gave way to the following:

- Tank Regiment (RCC): Originally equipped with the M41, later the Leopard 1A1 and M60 and today the Leopard 1A5. It currently has four squadrons, each with three platoons with four tanks each. (Note: “The Basic Plan for Structuring the Army (PBEEx), of 2003, transformed the two armored brigades into quarters, that is, organized into 02 (two) RCC and 02 (two) BIB and, consequently, both the RCC and the BIB became quarteraries as well, at 04 (four) SU each.” Souza Junior, 2010, pp. 49-50) They are the Army's shock force, used in destroying the enemy.
- Armored Cavalry Regiment (RCB): Combined arms organization, with two squadrons of tanks identical to those of the RCC and two squadrons of mechanized infantry identical to those of the Armored Infantry Battalion (BIB) companies, that is, three platoons of four M-113s each. Both move in tracked vehicles, although the RCB has simpler models. (Note: Leopard 1A1 BE, M60 A3 TTS and M-113 B, in the RCB, while the RCC uses the Leopard 1A5 and the BIB uses the M-113 BR (Mesquita 2015).) To operate, the RCC and BIB need to separate their components to form Task Forces (FT), while the RCB is itself a FT.
- Mechanized Cavalry Regiment (RC Mec): Wheeled armored unit, lighter than armored cavalry, for reconnaissance and security. It is organized into three squadrons, each with a command section with three platoons. The command has two trucks, an Armored Reconnaissance Vehicle (VBR, i.e. the Cascavel) and an Urutu/Guarani. Each platoon has two Cascavels and two Urutus/Guaranis (Note: Ogorkiewicz 1977 describes two Cascavels and only one Urutu. Engesa supplied 409 Cascavels and 217 Urutus to the Army, according to Bastos, Expedito Carlos Stephani (2006). "Uma realidade brasileira – As exportações dos veículos militares Engesa". Revista DaCultura. 6 (10)..)—one carrying a combat group and the other with an 81mm mortar—and five jeeps. Four of these small, lightly armed, unarmored vehicles, such as the Marruá, are scout patrols, and one belongs to the commander. (Note: Sampaio, Sampaio & Salles 2019, pp. 20–21, and Schäffer 2020. These components form the Command Group, Explorers Group, Combat Group (in the Armored Personnel Transport Vehicle, that is, the Urutu or Guarani), Armored Reconnaissance Vehicle section (Cascavels) and Support Unit (mortar).) The squadron can use mixed platoons or provisionally form platoons of just VBRs, marines, scouts, and mortars.
- Guards Cavalry Regiment (RCG): These are the ones that still use horses, such as the Independence Dragoons. They preserve equestrian traditions, participate in ceremonies and serve military mounted police duties.

Tracked and wheeled armored vehicles have different capabilities. Compared to wheeled vehicles, tracked vehicles have better off-road and tactical mobility and can carry greater armor and firepower. On the other hand, they have higher maintenance cost and lower strategic mobility. Wheeled vehicles can be air-transportable, make good use of the road network and quickly reach the conflict zone. They are best suited for low-intensity conflicts, while tracked vehicles are recommended for higher intensity.

=== Specialized squadrons ===
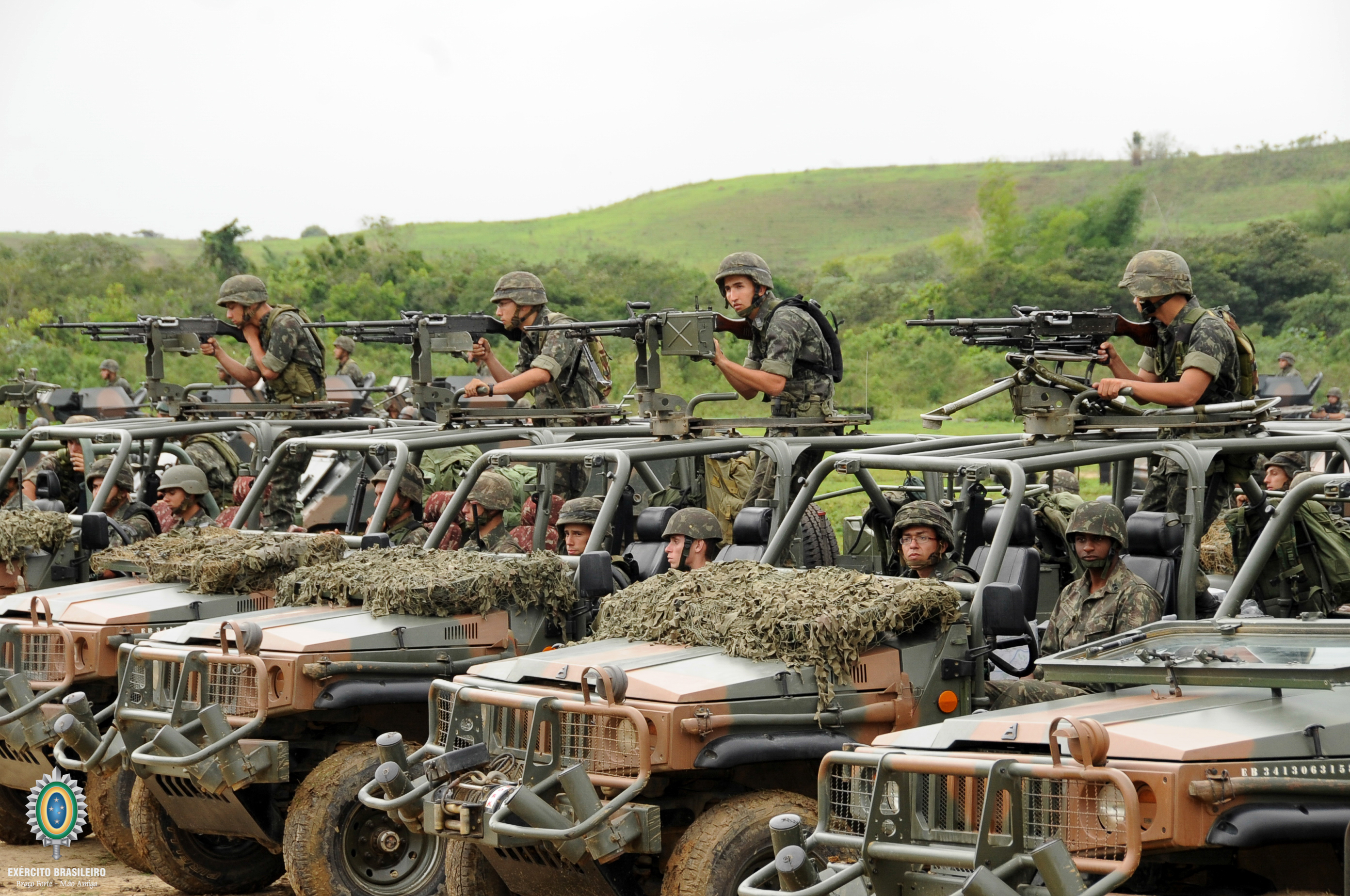
Mechanized cavalry explorers with the Agrale Marruá

The armored cavalry and infantry brigades have their own independent mechanized cavalry squadrons, with the same functions as the regiments. In some, the cavalry is not mechanized, but specialized for the type of brigade:

- 1st Parachute Cavalry Squadron: Planned since 1972 for the parachute brigade as a mechanized unit, it was only created in 1981 as a motorized force, operating 4x4 vehicles such as the Marruá and the Land Rover Defender and off-road motorcycles. Each of its recon groups has two light vehicles and four motorcycles. The lack of armored vehicles distinguished it from the other squadrons until 2021, when it received the Guarani, which can land with Air Force aircraft on runways previously captured by paratroopers.
- 1st Light Cavalry Squadron (Airmobile): Mechanized squadron converted to light in 2004 and composed of three scout platoons, which can be helilifted, and a mechanized platoon. Its firepower is limited. In 2015, it had only two of the three planned squads of explorers, each with Marruá vehicles and motorcycles, and the mechanized platoon operated the Urutu.
- 23rd Jungle Cavalry Squadron: Created in 2004 to defend the Tucuruí Hydroelectric Power Plant and serve the 23rd Jungle Infantry Brigade. It has three jungle cavalry platoons. It has a small river transport capacity and its only armored vehicle is the Urutu. Firepower is limited.

=== Evolution of brigades and divisions ===
During the Paraguayan War, cavalry regiments were organized into twelve brigades, six divisions and an army corps. However, the Imperial Army did not have a permanent organization of high-ranking peacetime command until the 1908 reforms, which created five "strategic brigades" and three cavalry brigades. (Note: Pedrosa 2018, pp. 135–136. The original cavalry brigade had three regiments, a group of horse artillery and a supply column.) These brigades were expanded into Cavalry Divisions (DC) in 1921. (Note: Roesler 2021, p. 183. The transformation was one of the influences of the French Military Mission, aiming at a possible war with Argentina. Each division had two brigades of two regiments (EsAO, s/d (2)). These new brigades were decommissioned in 1939 (AHEx 2020, pp. 374–375) but still figured in the legal organization in 1946. In the 1957 organization, the regiments were three per DC.) From 1944 to 1946 the DCs were grouped into an army corps. Since 1908, there was also a cavalry regiment in the "strategic brigades", which were basically infantry, and in their successors, the "army divisions" (DEs) of 1915 and Infantry Divisions (DIs) of 1921, (Note: Pedrosa 2018, pp. 135–136. The 3rd Army Division, in Rio de Janeiro, had its own cavalry brigade (the 4th) with two regiments. (AHEx 2020, pp. 374–376, Magalhães 1998, p. 326, also visible in the Decree No. 11,497, of 23 February 1915).) until the abolition of that regiment from the 1946 organization. Still, the DIs now had a reconnaissance squadron. Regiments in cavalry-only brigades or divisions were "Independent Regiments" (RCI), while those supporting infantry-based divisions were "Divisional Cavalry" (RCD); this nomenclature existed from 1919 to 1946. (Note: EsAO, s/d (2). In the 1st Military Circumscription, in Mato Grosso, there was also two RCIs.)

The actual organization of the divisions differed from the theoretical one and some units were absent, especially engineers and anti-aircraft artillery. Even so, in 1960 the DCs were more complete than the infantry divisions and the first three had four regiments each, one more than expected, having between 5,204 and 6,046 troops in 1961. The 4th, with only two, had 3,603 soldiers. In 1960 most regiments, with the exception of the 11th, only had two squadrons each.

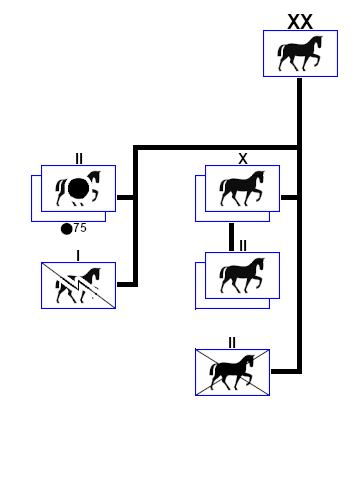
Cavalry division in 1921

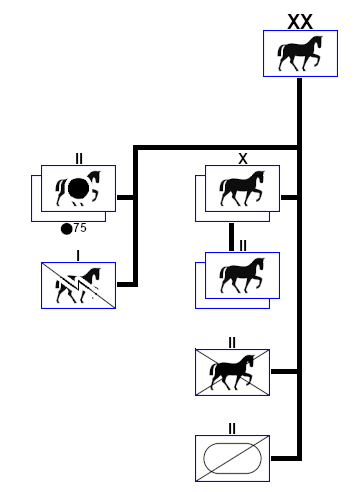
Cavalry division in 1934

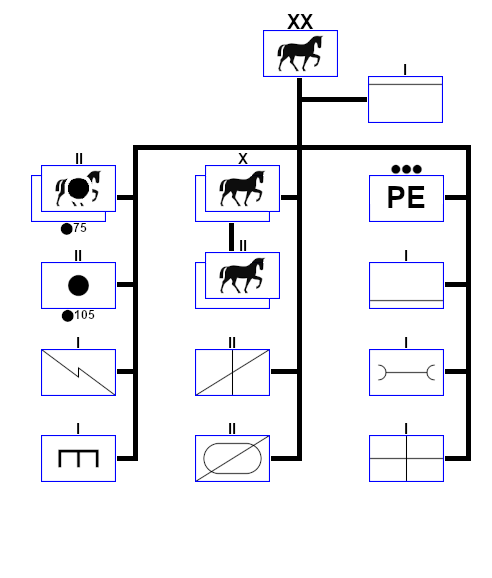
Cavalry division in 1946

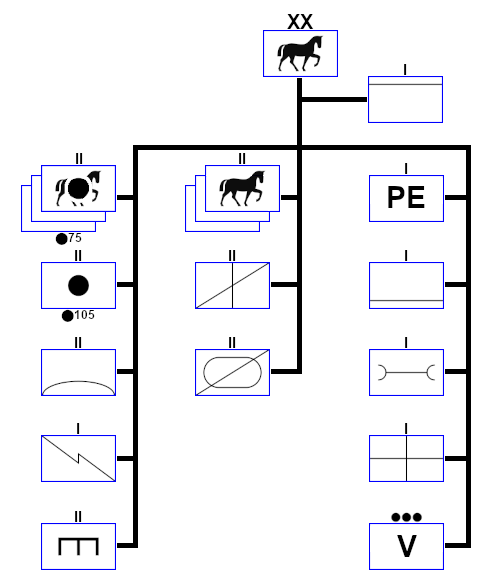
Cavalry division in 1957

In 1943, a Motomechanized Division was planned with an organization similar to the armored division of the American Army, which exerted a strong doctrinal influence on the Brazilian one since its participation in World War II. It had three BCCs and three battalions of motorized infantry. In 1946 the infantry became armored, using the M3 half-track. The Armored Division (DB) was still only a nucleus, being considered completed in 1957. It had 3,946 soldiers in 1961. The maneuver units were strong, lacking only a BIB and the heavy armored battalion, but combat support was paltry: the engineering battalion and all the artillery were lacking.

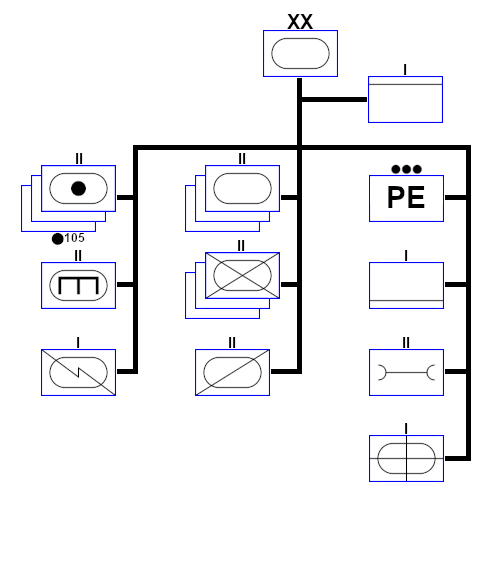
Armored division in 1946

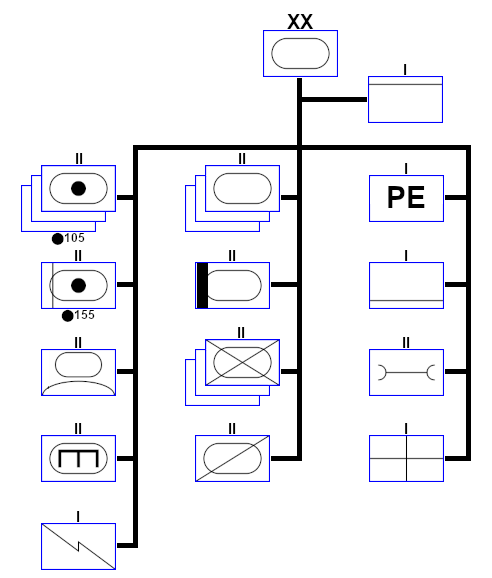
Armored division in 1957

In the 1970s the brigade became the main large unit, replacing the division. The DC became the "Mechanized Cavalry Brigade" (Bda C Mec), and the DB the "Armored Cavalry Brigade" (Bda C Bld). The Bda C Mec has two RC Mec and one RCB. Mechanized regiments have lighter armor and great mobility across roads, conducting reconnaissance and security over great distances. The armored regiment has the most armor, tactical mobility and firepower within the brigade and can launch offensives alone or reinforce the other two. The Bda C Bld had two RCC and one BIB, thus being very similar to the Armored Infantry Brigade (Bda Inf Bld), with the difference that the infantry brigade had one RCC, two BIB and, to accompany these forces of great offensive power, a battalion of motorized infantry to occupy terrain. In this period the BIBs had their half-tracks replaced by the M-113. The armored brigades, in addition to the motorized infantry brigade, had their own Esqd C Mec.

The transformation was inspired by that carried out from 1957 onwards in the U.S. Army. The need to disperse forces to minimize the damage of a tactical nuclear bombing led to a reorganization of the order of battle - in the American case, of the armored division - and an increase in the density of radios and message flow, both repeated in Brazil. The Brazilian mechanized cavalry brigade was equivalent to the American "armored cavalry regiment", with some differences, and the Brazilian mechanized cavalry platoon was identical to the American armored cavalry platoon of 1960.

The Bda C Mec may have three RC Mec instead of two. Bda C Bld and Bda C Inf were reorganized in 2003, becoming identical. Their current composition is quaternary, with two RCC and two BIB.

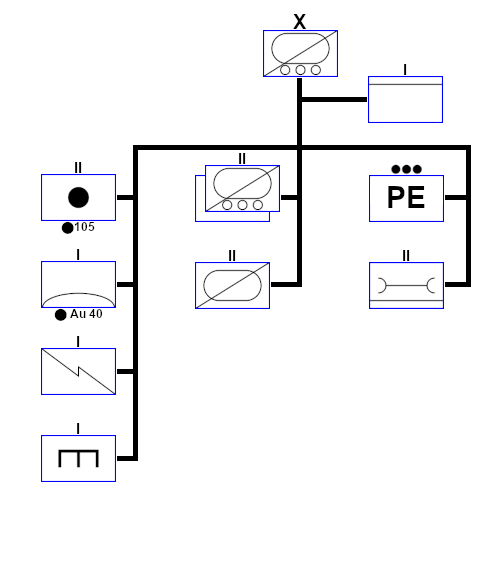
Mechanized cavalry brigade in 1972

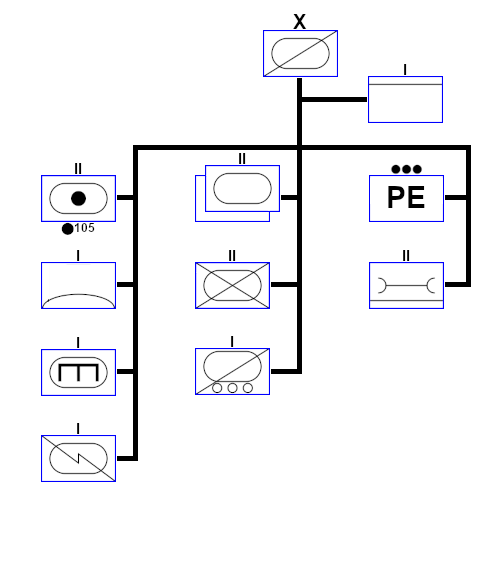
Armored cavalry brigade in 1972

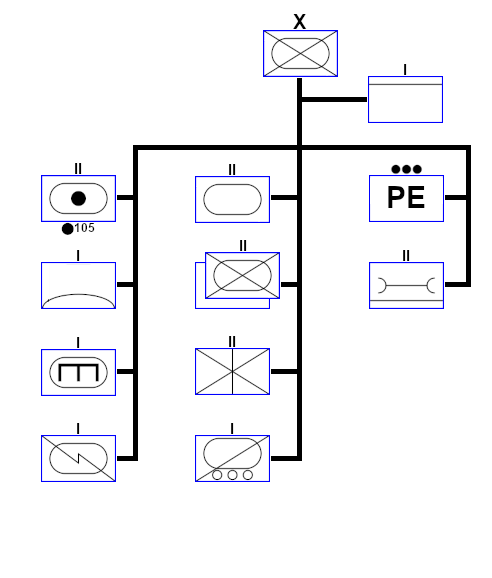
Armored infantry brigade in 1972

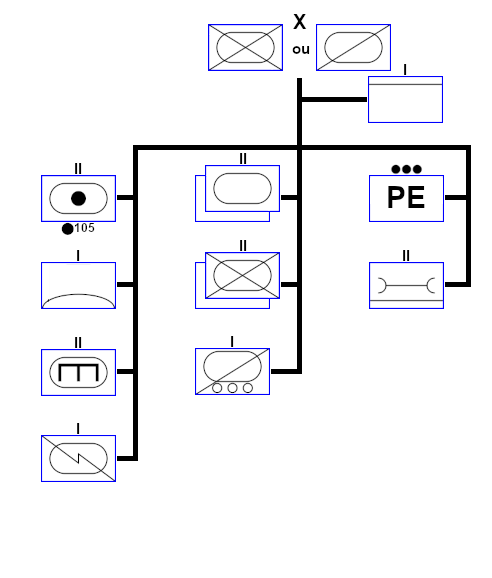
Cavalry brigade or armored infantry, 2003

=== Support units ===
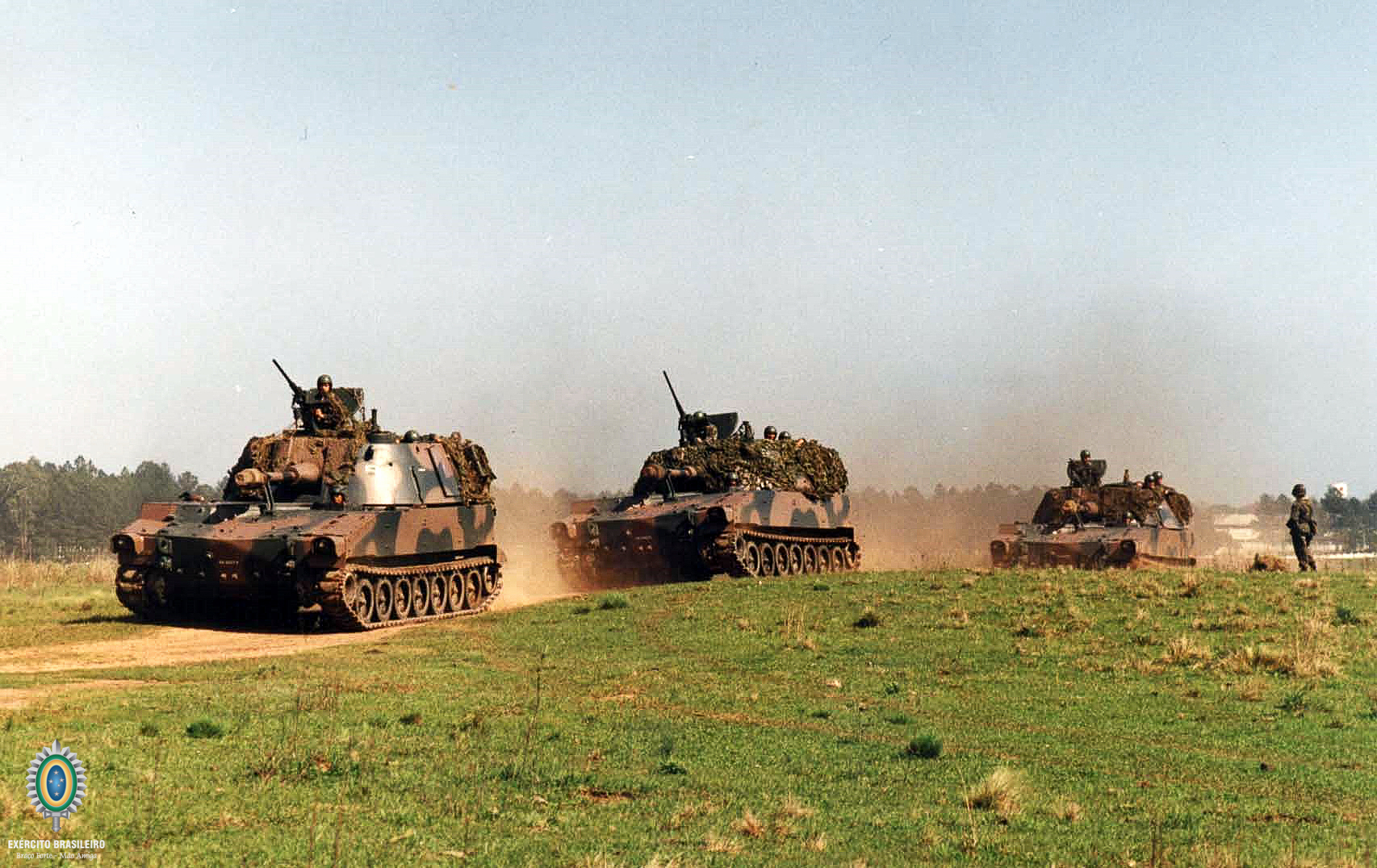
Self-propelled artillery

The current brigades are complete units, with all artillery, engineering and logistics support required to operate independently. These elements are armored or mechanized, so they can accompany the maneuver units. Wheeled support units can accompany tracked forces, as they have the same speed during tactical missions.

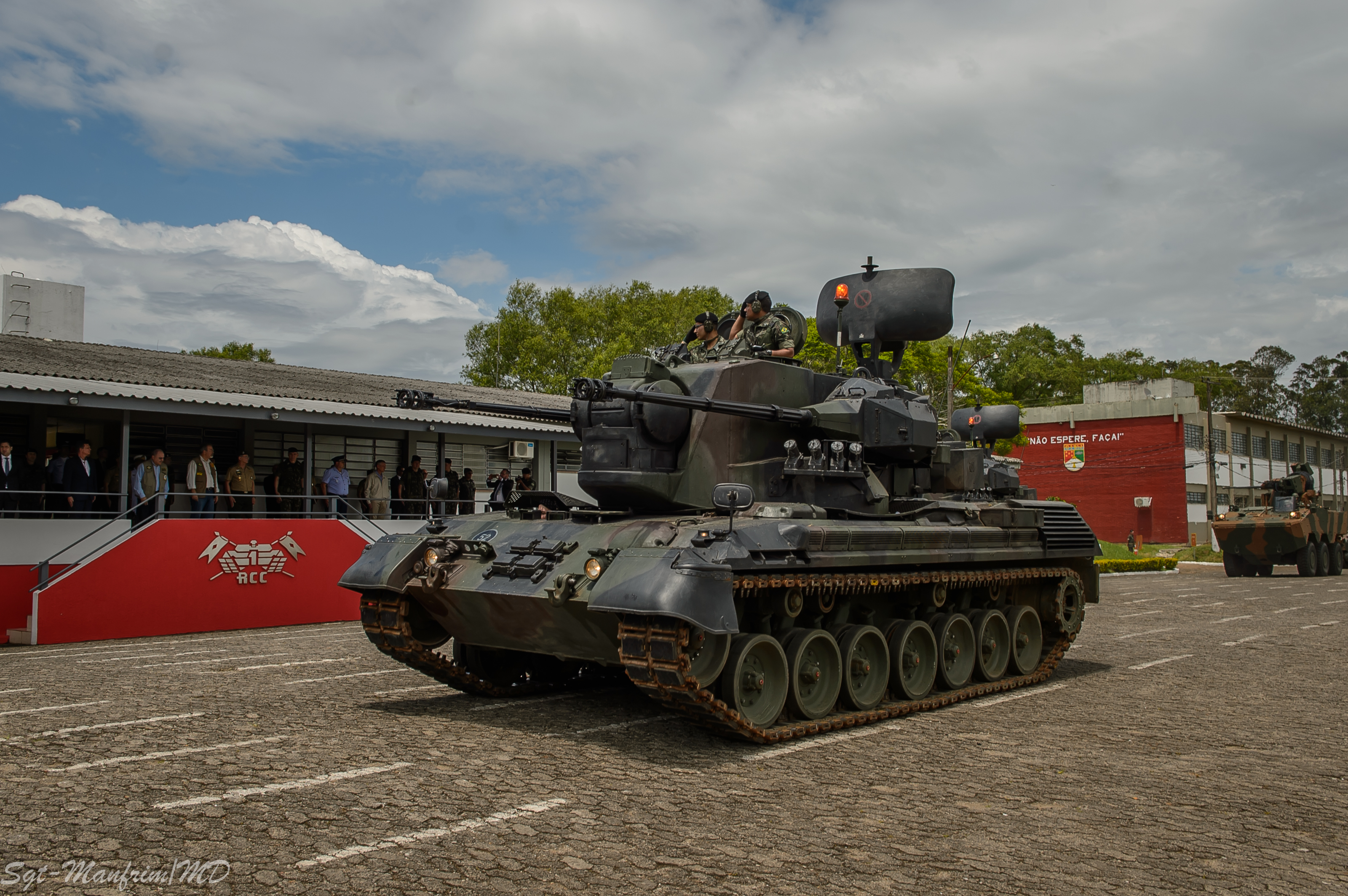
Gepard anti-air artillery

The Bda C Bld has self-propelled artillery. The Bda C Mec has towed howitzers. In both brigades the caliber was originally 105mm. Currently the 2nd C Mec Bda, unlike the others, uses self-propelled howitzers, while the armored brigades use 155mm self-propelled artillery. The Bda C Bld has a field artillery group with four batteries, while the Bda C Mec has a group of three. Other forces are the command squad itself, the anti-aircraft artillery battery, the combat engineering battalion or company, the Army Police platoon and the logistic battalion with supply, health, personnel and maintenance logistic companies. The Bda C Mec logistics battalion is not, in practice, capable of maintaining the RCB's tracked vehicles, and therefore they undergo maintenance in the regiment itself or in the Regional Maintenance Parks.

=== Geographic distribution ===
Despite the closer relations between Argentina and Brazil since the 1980s, mechanized cavalry, armored vehicles, self-propelled and towed artillery, engineers and the Brazilian Air Force remain concentrated in the southern region, with cavalry stationed close to the Argentine border. At the beginning of the 21st century, even more armored vehicles were transferred to the South, on the grounds that the terrain is ideal for training. The Pampa is indeed a favorable environment for armored vehicles, and there are historical factors — the gauchos' interest in cavalry lasted after mechanization. On the other hand, other regions of the country also have areas of suitable terrain. The North and Northeast, also strategic regions, have little cavalry. National interest in the North has grown, but the Amazon terrain is not conducive to armored vehicles, with the exception of the M-113 and Urutu, which are amphibious. In northern Roraima there is the "lavrado" terrain, with open spaces for movement.

The three Mechanized Cavalry Brigades in Rio Grande do Sul are responsible for stretches of the borders: the 1st with Argentina, from Santa Catarina to Itaqui, the 2nd around the triple border and the 3rd with part of the border with Uruguay. Relocating a brigade to the Northeast was considered in the 2016–2019 Army Strategic Plan. The 2nd would be the most likely to be moved, as it would be enough to extend the stretches under the responsibility of the other two, without creating a vacuum on the border. The transfer of the 4th, with its regiments lined up on the Paraguayan border, in Mato Grosso do Sul, would be unfeasible.

Cavalry's historical distribution

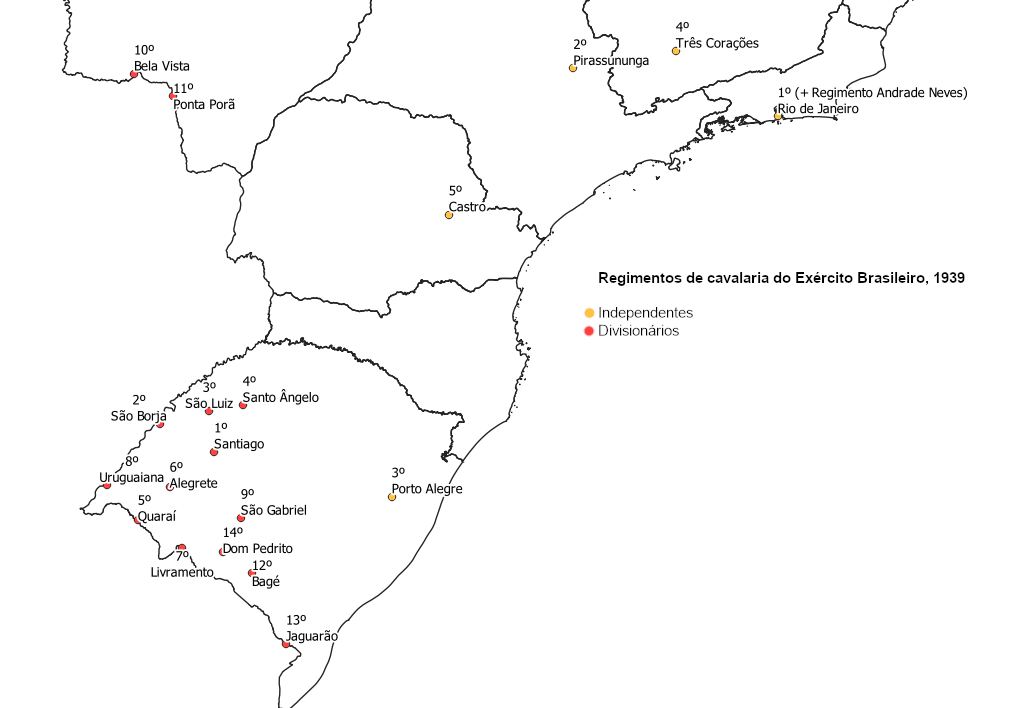
Regiments in 1939

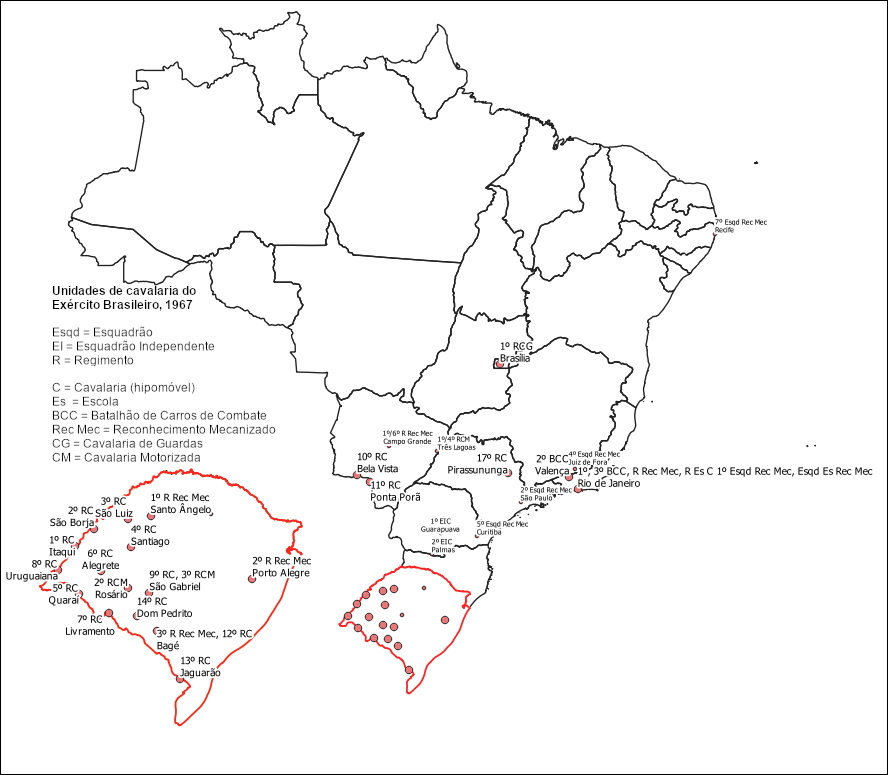
Regiments and squadrons in 1967

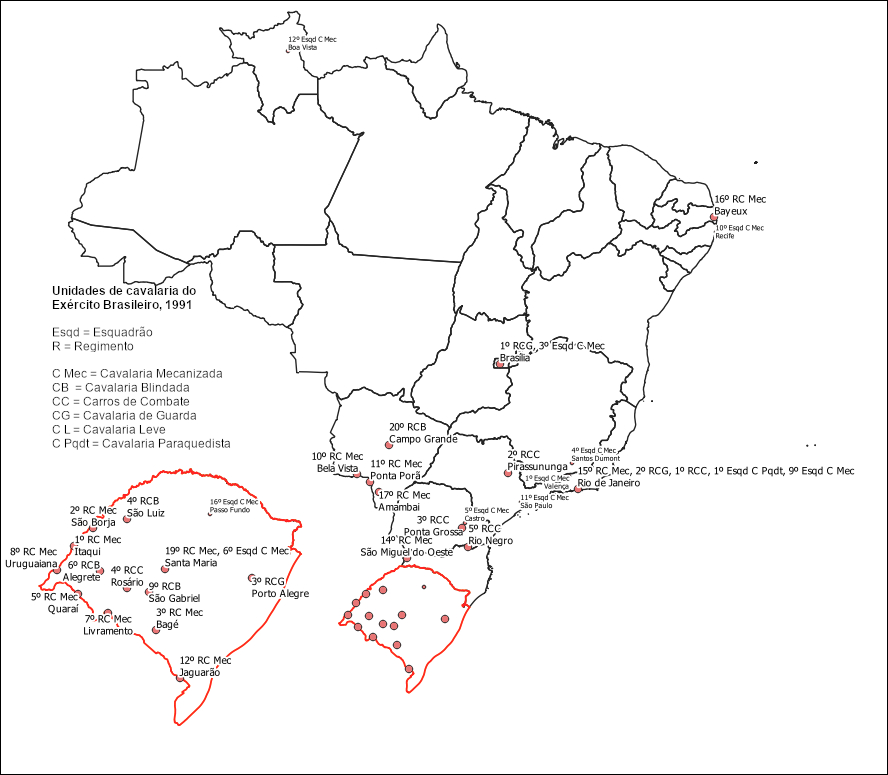
Regiments and squadrons in 1991

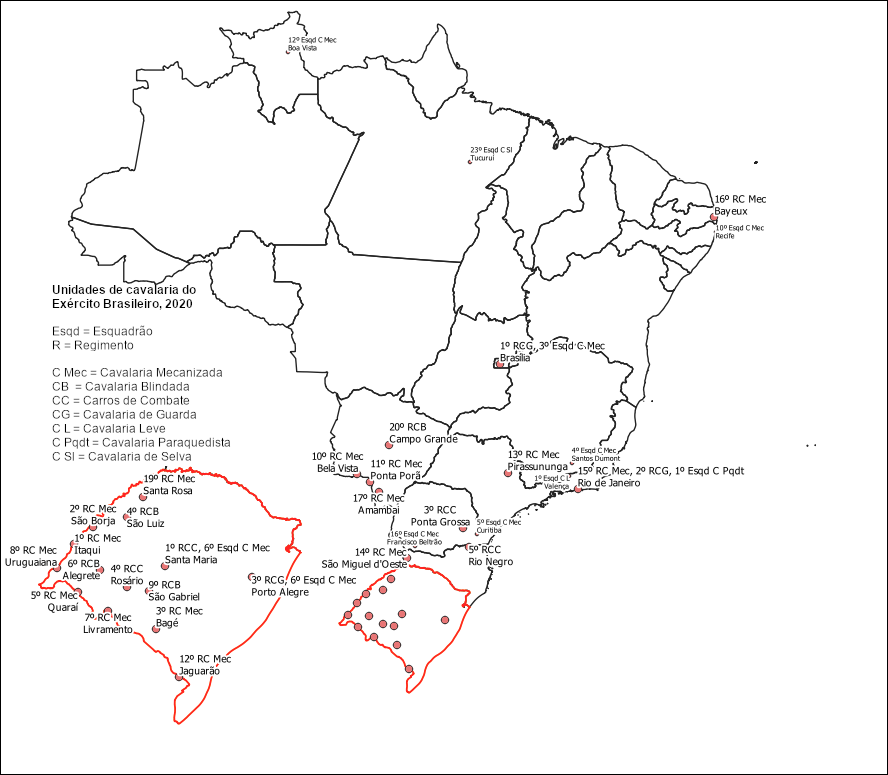
Regiments and squadrons in 2020

== Current brigades ==
=== 1st Bda C Mec ===
Coat of arms

Organization (2005)
- Command Squadron of the 1st Mechanized Cavalry Brigade (Santiago - RS)
- 1st Mechanized Cavalry Regiment (Itaqui - RS)
- 2nd Mechanized Cavalry Regiment (São Borja - RS)
- 4th Armored Cavalry Regiment (São Luiz Gonzaga - RS)
- 19th Field Artillery Group (Santiago - RS)
- 9th Logistics Battalion (Santiago - RS)
- 1st Mechanized Battle Engineer Company (São Borja - RS)
- 11th Mechanized Communications Company (Santiago - RS)
- 1st Army Police Platoon (Santiago - RS)

Headquartered in Santiago, Rio Grande do Sul, it reports to the 3rd Army Division. It was formed in Santiago as the 1st Cavalry Division, in 1921. (Note: The 1st DC emerged in 1921 through the union of the old 1st brigade, from 1908, and part of the 2nd brigade, respectively from São Luiz Gonzaga and Rosário do Sul. AHEx 2020, pp. 374–376.) It was converted to a mechanized cavalry brigade in 1971. Its title is "José Luiz Menna Barreto Brigade".

Just before the 1930 Revolution, its commander, lieutenant colonel Otávio Pires Coelho, concealed loyalty to the government, but at the time of the revolution's outbreak he assured control of Santiago to the revolutionaries. In the Legality Campaign in 1961, it had orders to invade São Paulo by rail at Ourinhos and on 30 August its vanguard was already in Ponta Grossa. When, in the following years, general Olímpio Mourão Filho, commander of the 3rd Infantry Division in Santa Maria, conspired against the government of João Goulart, he avoided the 1st DC due to the alignment of its commander Oromar Osório with the government. Likewise, the commander in 1964, general João de Deus Nunes Saraiva, declined the offer to join the ongoing coup. However, his division was immobilized, as the 3rd DI (then under general Poppe de Figueiredo) controlled the railways. Saraiva accepted the call to Porto Alegre, where he met with the legalist leadership. As a result, the division was acephalous.

=== 2nd Bda C Mec ===
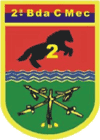
Coat of arms

Organization (2016)
- 2nd Mechanized Cavalry Brigade Command Squadron (Uruguaiana - RS)
- 5th Mechanized Cavalry Regiment (Quaraí - RS)
- 8th Mechanized Cavalry Regiment (Uruguaiana - RS)
- 6th Armored Cavalry Regiment (Alegrete - RS)
- 22nd Field Artillery Group (Uruguaiana - RS)
- 10th Logistics Battalion (Alegrete - RS)
- 2nd Mechanized Battle Engineer Company (Alegrete - RS)
- 12th Mechanized Communications Company (Alegrete - RS)
- 2nd Army Police Platoon (Uruguaiana - RS)

It is based in Uruguaiana, Rio Grande do Sul, and is subordinate to the 3rd Army Division. As the 2nd Cavalry Division, its headquarters moved several times between the current one and Alegrete. (Note: The division arose from the merger of parts of the former 2nd and 3rd brigades, respectively from Rosário do Sul and Bagé. AHEx 2020, pp. 374–376.) Conversion to mechanized cavalry brigade happened in 1971–2. Its title is "Brigada Charrua".

In the 1930 Revolution, the commander, colonel Euclides Figueiredo, was inspecting another unit and Alegrete joined the revolutionaries. In 1961 it accompanied the 1st DC and transferred a regiment to Porto Alegre. It later became part of Mourão Filho's conspiracy. The commander, general Camarinha, joined the 1964 coup. In 1971 it was mobilized to participate in Operation Thirty Hours, a plan to invade Uruguay.

=== 3rd Bda C Mec ===
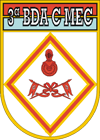
Coat of arms

Organization (2017)
- Command Squadron of the 3rd Mechanized Cavalry Brigade (Bagé - RS)
- 3rd Mechanized Cavalry Regiment (Bagé - RS)
- 7th Mechanized Cavalry Regiment (Santana do Livramento - RS)
- 12th Mechanized Cavalry Regiment (Jaguarão - RS)
- 9th Armored Cavalry Regiment (São Gabriel - RS)
- 25th Field Artillery Group (Bagé - RS)
- 3rd Logistics Battalion Batalhão Logístico (Bagé – RS)
- 2ª Bateria de Artilharia Antiaérea (Santana do Livramento - RS)
- 3ª Companhia de Engenharia de Combate Mecanizada (Dom Pedrito - RS)
- 13ª Companhia de Comunicações Mecanizada (São Gabriel - RS)
- 3º Pelotão de Polícia do Exército (Bagé - RS)

It is based in Bagé, Rio Grande do Sul, and reports to the 6th Army Division. As the 3rd Cavalry Division, it was originally from São Gabriel and came to the current city in 1926. (Note: The division arose from part of the former 3rd Brigade. AHEx 2020, pp. 374–376.) In 1968, it was the first DC to become a mechanized cavalry brigade, still on an experimental basis. Its title is "Brigada Patrício Corrêa da Câmara".

Its commander was arrested by the revolutionaries in 1930. In the 1961 campaign it was left in reserve. It later became part of Mourão Filho's conspiracy. In 1964 the commander, general Hugo Garrastazu, was ordered to move forces towards Santa Catarina to face the coup plotters, but adhered to the coup on the morning of April 1, under pressure from his officers and after the decision of general Amaury Kruel, commander of the Second Army, to which he was very attached. This was decisive for the subsequent adhesion of general Poppe, commander of the 3rd DI, who controlled many troops and the railway network. However, Garrastazu was expelled from headquarters itself by loyalist sergeants, who only surrendered after Poppe's definition changed the balance of forces. Garrastazu doubted he could move his division, but on the 2nd he was ordered to threaten Porto Alegre; the communication was made clear to be heard by loyalists still in control of the city. After the coup he was not promoted.

=== 4th Bda C Mec ===
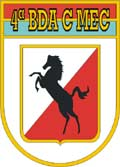
Coat of arms

Organization (2018)
- Command Squadron of the 4th Mechanized Cavalry Brigade (Dourados - MS)
- 10th Mechanized Cavalry Regiment (Ponta Porã - MS)
- 11th Mechanized Cavalry Regiment (Bela Vista - MS)
- 17th Mechanized Cavalry Regiment (Amambai - MS)
- 20th Armored Cavalry Regiment (Campo Grande - MS)
- 9th Field Artillery Group (Nioaque - MS)
- 28th Logistics Battalion (Dourados - MS)
- 3rd Anti-air Artillery Battery (Três Lagoas - MS)
- 4th Mechanized Battle Engineer Company (Jardim - MS)
- 14th Mechanized Communications Company (Dourados - MS)
- 4th Army Police Platoon (Dourados - MS)

Headquartered in Dourados, Mato Grosso do Sul, it is subordinate to the Western Military Command (CMO) and is a readiness unit. Its title is "Brigada Guaicurus". It has among its regiments the 20th RCB, current operator of the M60. The brigade is the CMO's strategic cover force, able to impose itself by the armored force. The other brigade in Mato Grosso do Sul, the 18th Infantry, is much lighter and serves only for strategic surveillance. Due to its position on the Paraguayan border and complete organization, the 4th Cavalry was chosen to be the first to implement the Integrated Border Monitoring System. SISFRON, as it is called, integrates sensors, cameras, vehicles, radars, meteorological stations and detects activities such as drug trafficking, mining, deforestation and forest burning. In the future, it may cover other stretches of borders, such as those in Paraná and the Amazon.

Created as the 4th Cavalry Division in 1949, it covered the border with Paraguay, of lower priority than Rio Grande do Sul, and thus with only two cavalry regiments (10th and 11th) and motorized and mechanized elements at squadron-only level. In 1964 it was ready to reinforce São Paulo or the forces of Cuiabá, which advanced against Brasília. The 17th RC was transferred from Pirassununga to the region in 1969. The brigade was mechanized in December 1980, but this transformation was nominal, as its horse regiments took until later in the decade to be transformed into mechanized cavalry. The local armored cavalry, the 20th RCB, is the evolution of the division's mechanized squadron.

=== 5th Bda C Bld ===
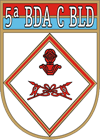
Coat of arms

Organization (2021)
- Command Squadron of the 5th Armored Cavalry Brigade (Ponta Grossa - PR)
- 3rd Tank Regiment (Ponta Grossa - PR)
- 5th Tank Regiment (Rio Negro - PR)
- 13th Armored Infantry Battalion (Ponta Grossa - PR)
- 20th Armored Infantry Battalion (Curitiba - PR)
- 5th Mechanized Cavalry Squadron (Castro - PR)
- 5th Self propelled Artillery Group (Curitiba - PR)
- 11th Self propelled Anti Air Artillery Battery (Rio Negro - PR)
- 5th Armored Battle Engineer Battalion (Porto União - SC)
- 5th Logistics Battalion (Curitiba - PR)
- 5th Armored Communications Company (Curitiba - PR)
- 25th Mechanized Army Police Platoon (Ponta Grossa - PR)

Headquartered in Ponta Grossa, Paraná, it is subordinate to the 5th Army Division and is a readiness unit. Its title is "Brigada General Tertuliano de Albuquerque Potyguara". The current 5th Armored Cavalry Brigade descends from the former 5th Armored Infantry Brigade. The former armored cavalry brigade, the successor of the Armored Division and located in Rio de Janeiro, was disbanded in 2004 to effect this transition. Thus, the plans to transfer the brigade from Rio de Janeiro to Paraná without changing the brigade from Paraná were not carried out.

The 5th Bda Inf Bld was created as the "9th Infantry Brigade" in 1934 and converted into the "Divisionary Infantry of the 5th Infantry Division" in 1938, it moved from its first headquarters in Curitiba to Ponta Grossa (1944), Florianópolis (1952) and again Ponta Grossa (1955), having the name of "Subcommand of the 5th Infantry Division" between 1946 and 1952. At the time of the 1964 coup, the Divisional Infantry was commanded by general Chrysantho de Miranda Figueiredo, a public supporter of Goulart's policies. On vacation in Rio de Janeiro, he announced his return, but the coup plotters in Curitiba managed to conspire with the governor and the commander of the Air Base to divert the plane, which headed for Porto Alegre. His troops were then moved towards Rio Grande do Sul, still controlled by the loyalists. In 1971 it finally became the 5th Armored Infantry Brigade.

The Motomechanized Division, the predecessor of the Armored Division, existed only as a nucleus, organized in 1944. The DB became the former 5th Armored Cavalry Brigade in 1971.

== Neighboring forces ==
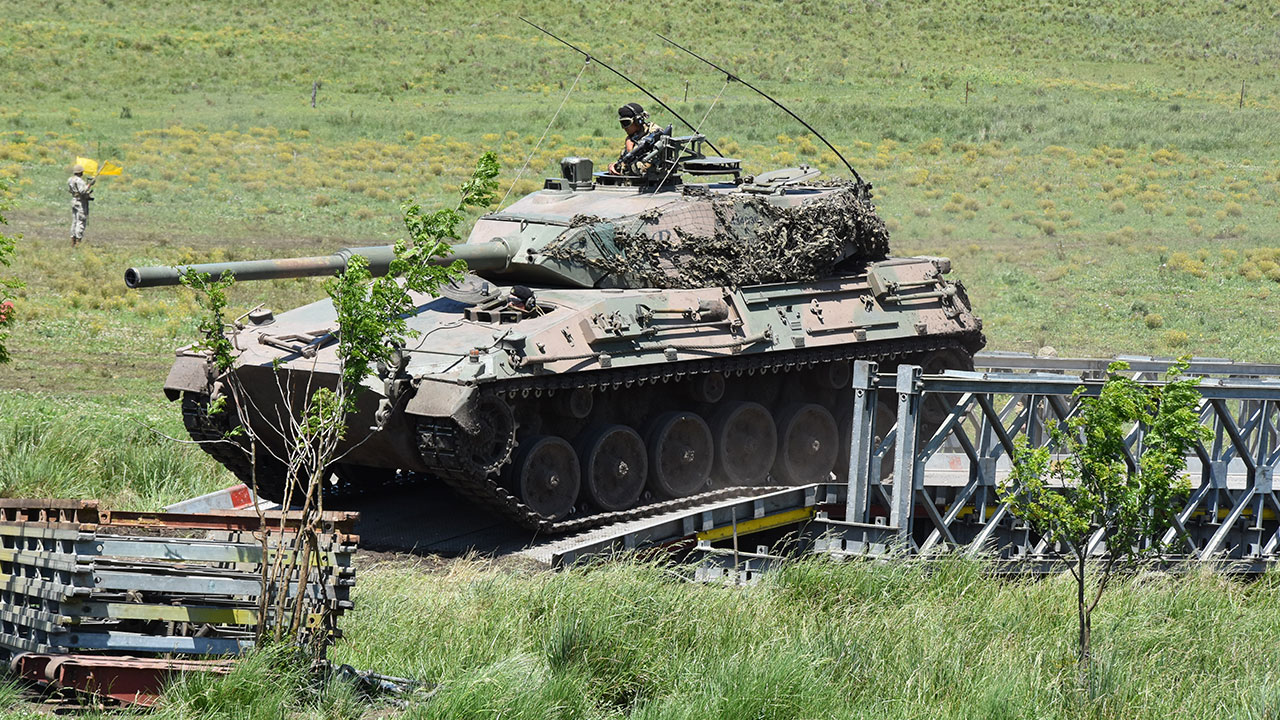
Argentine TAM

The Argentine Army has armored brigades with tank cavalry (TAM) and mechanized infantry (TAM VCTP), quaternary brigades like the Brazilian ones, and mechanized brigades with tank cavalry (SK-105 Kürassier) and mechanized infantry (M-113). Both also have exploration cavalry, which use the AML-90 and have a similar function to the Brazilian mechanized cavalry. In 2010 both the tank cavalry and the mechanized infantry of the Argentine armored brigades were called regiments and organized into three squadrons/companies.

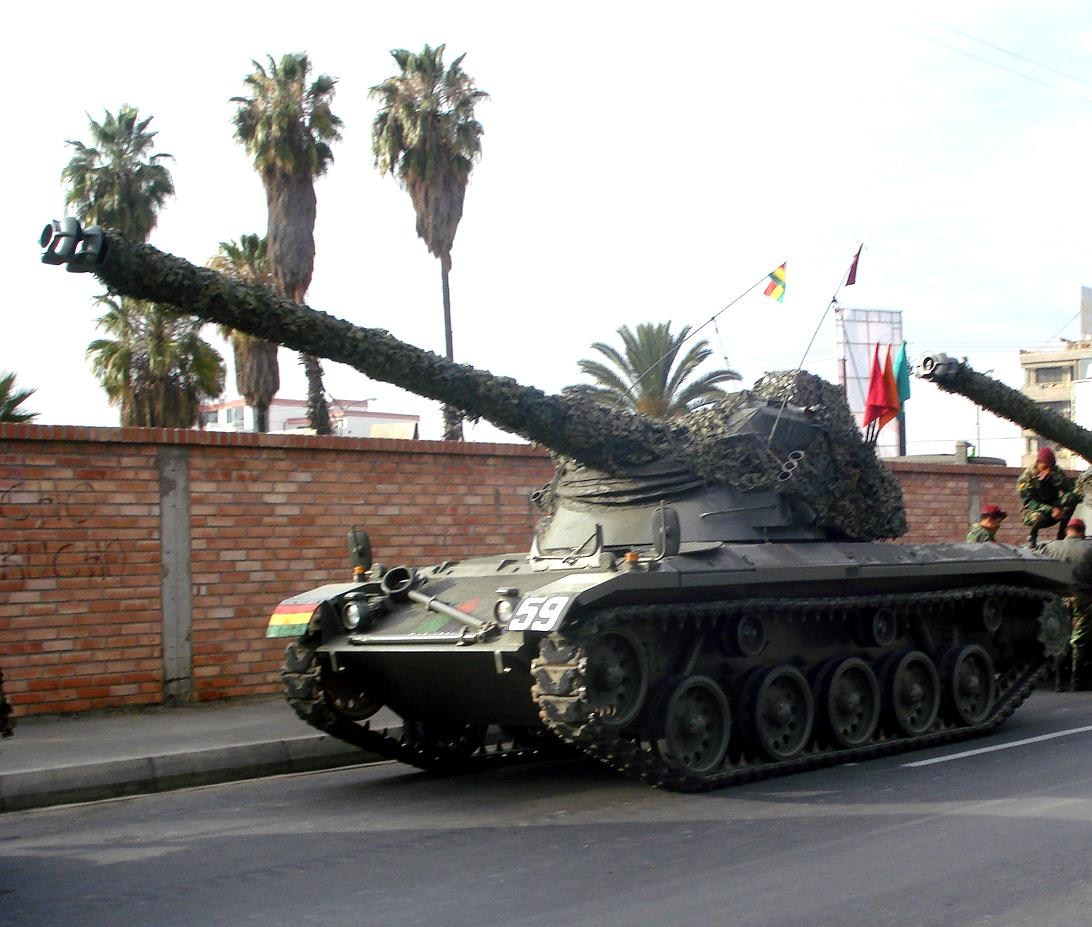
Bolivian SK-105

The TAM is a post-war 2nd generation or 1st intermediate generation. In 2021 it was still being modernized for the TAM 2C model. It is an armored vehicle on par with the Leopard 1A5 BR. Both have a 105mm cannon. The TAM 2C's high impact range is lower (2,000 vs 2,500m), giving the Leopard 1 the standoff ability, that is, to attack the target when it is still too far away to respond. On the other hand, the TAM 2C has better commander's periscope and embedded technology. Armor was not a priority in the original TAM design, but it matches all modernizations and has good defensive characteristics as a low silhouette and mobility. In this last aspect, the TAM 2C is superior in crossing obstacles.

In the Western Military Command, the M60 A3 TTs of the 20th RCB, of second generation, have on the other side of the border Paraguayan first generation armored vehicles and Bolivian SK-105/A1 Kürassier tank destroyers. The M60 is superior on both fronts. In the case of the SK-105, it is a lighter vehicle (17,700 kg against 52,617 kg of the M60), with a power/weight ratio of 18.1 hp/ton, against 9.12 hp/ton of the M60. Its speed in unfavorable terrain is 50 km/h, unlike the 30 km/h of the M60, which only wins in the ability to overcome obstacles. In addition to mobility, the small size and low silhouette are defensive advantages for the SK-105, but its armor is very light and does not resist the M60's cannon. Both use a 105mm cannon, but the M60 has a stabilized turret and superior fire control and night vision systems.

Organizational comparison - Brazilian and Argentine armored/mechanized brigades

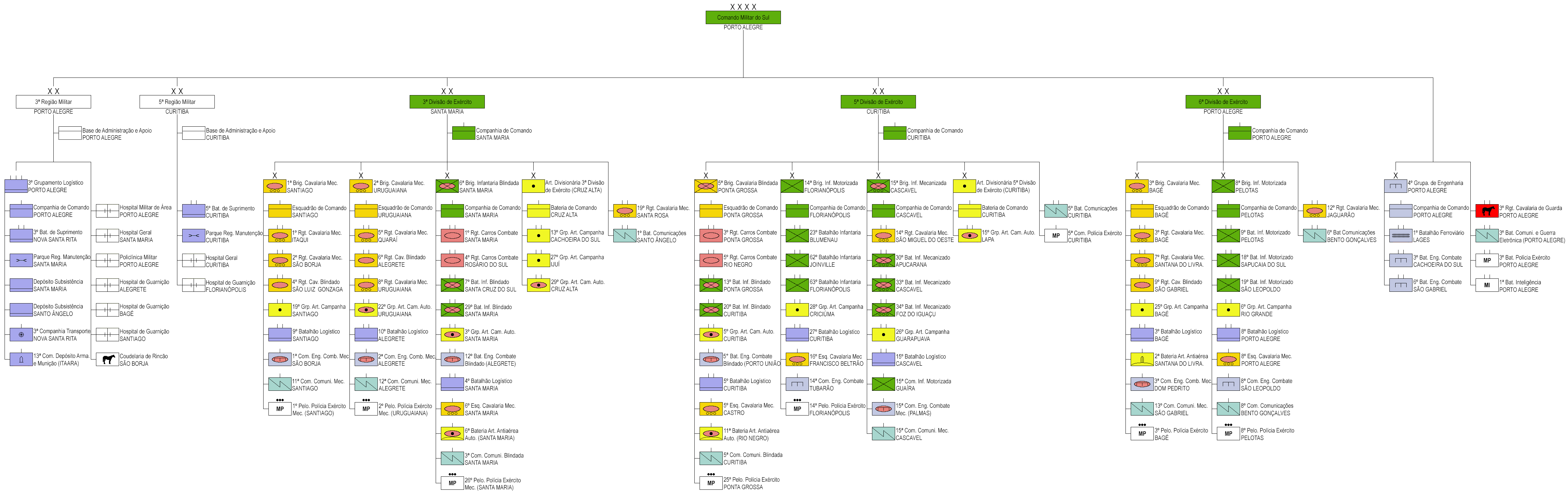
Southern Military Command (Brazil)

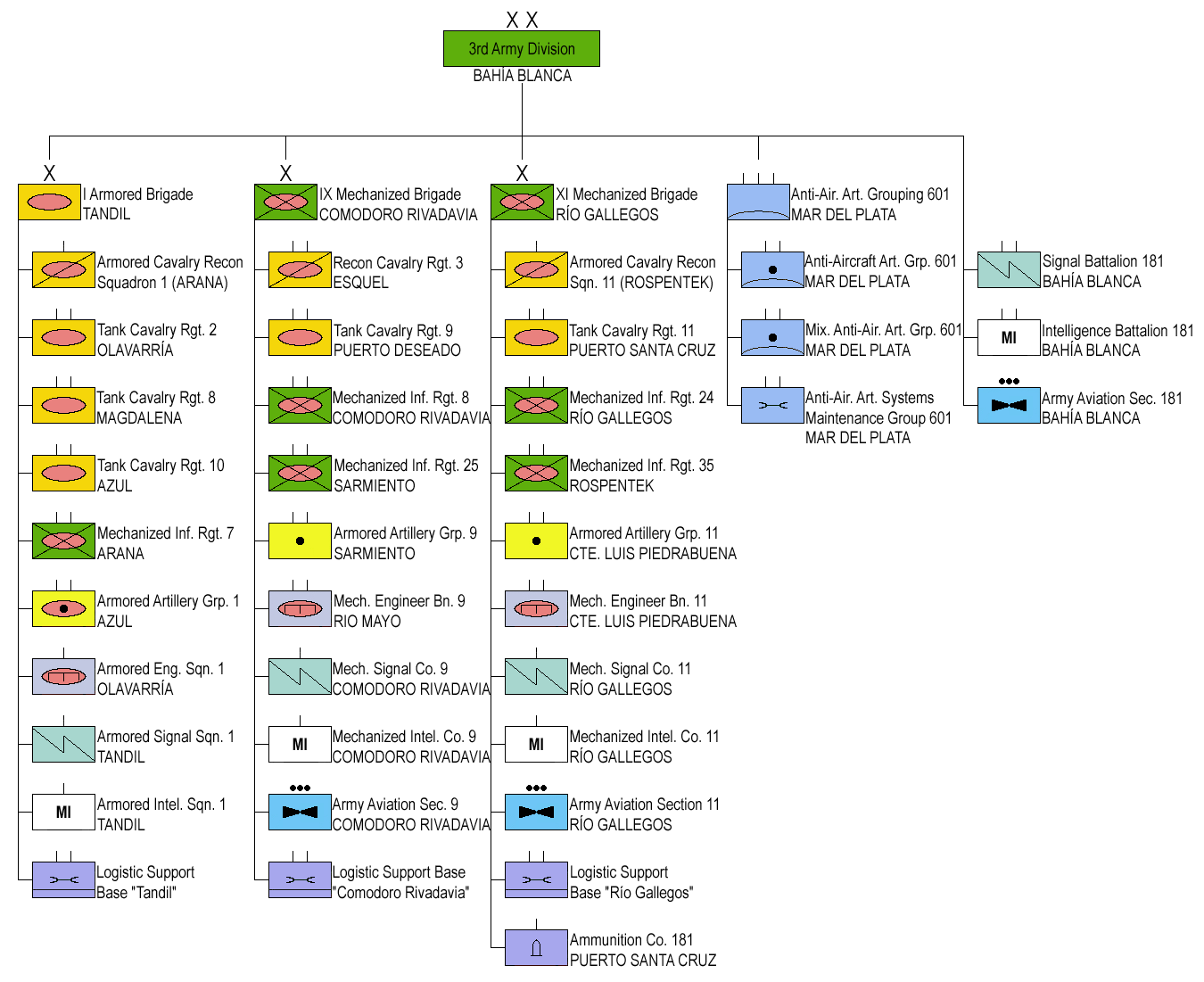
3rd Army Division (Argentina)

== Cavalry outside the Army ==
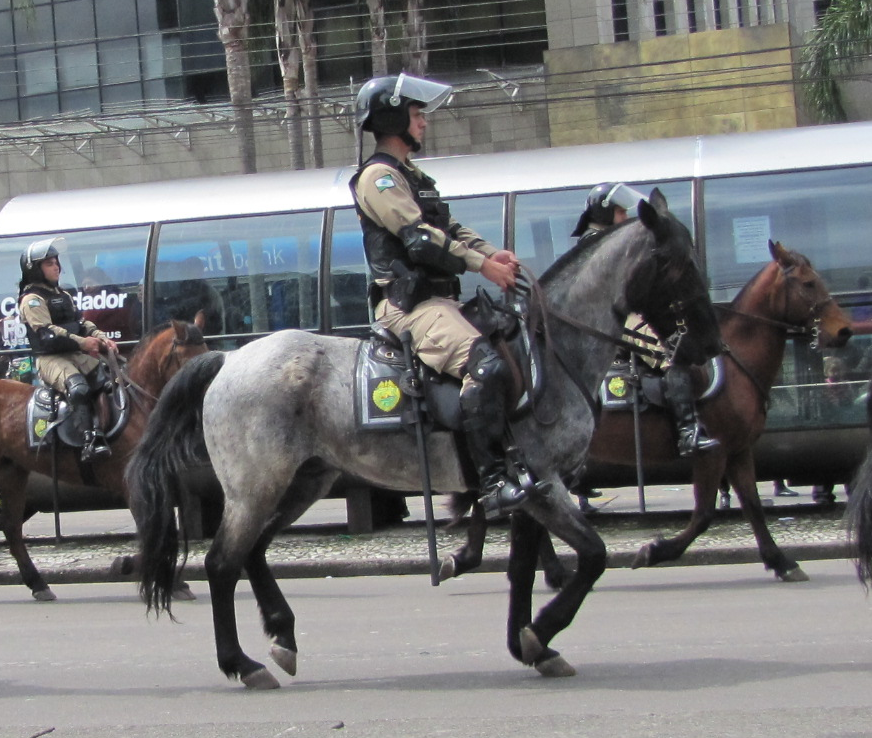
Shock policing of the Military Police of Paraná

Most Military Police forces operate units on horseback. In their daily duties, they carry out proactive policing, and in some cases they can monitor events (sports, artistic, political, exhibitions, etc.), carry out ceremonial escorts and act in the control of disturbances and repossessions. Police cavalry are considered excellent shock troops. In the First Brazilian Republic, when the police were "state armies", they trained both infantry and cavalry for war.

In the Marine Corps there is no cavalry; the only base branch is infantry and armor is considered a support. However, marines can perform tasks that would be typical of cavalry in the Army, even having their own units for this purpose, such as Land and Amphibious Reconnaissance Companies. Older officers, trained until 1990 at the Army Officers Improvement School, still admitted to using armored vehicles as a basic weapon. The closest thing to "amphibious cavalry" would be in the Corps' tanks; the pioneers of the EE-11 Urutu in the Brazilian Navy, from 1973 to 1975, used a seahorse as a symbol. In the late 1990s, the formation of a "Mechanized Infantry Battalion of Marines”, with a structure similar to that of an Army Armored Cavalry Brigade, was discussed.

== See also ==
- Armoured warfare
- Maneuver warfare
