= List of equipment of the Ecuadorian Armed Forces =

List of Ecuadorian Army equipment

This is a list of equipment of the Ecuadorian Army. Historically, the Ecuadorian Army depended on various foreign suppliers like India, the United States and Germany for virtually all of its equipment needs. The rotary wing of the Ecuadorian Army depends on HAL Dhruv helicopters from India. Only in the 1980s did it begin to develop a modest domestic arms industry as the Directorate of Army Industries manufactured rifle ammunition, uniforms, boots, and other consumable items. The Army's present-day equipment is mostly of Western origin.

== Army ==
=== Armoured fighting vehicles ===
Model	Image	Origin	Quantity	Details
Light tanks
AMX-13		France	~108	In 1988, Ecuador upgraded its fleet of 108 AMX-13 light tanks armed with 105 mm guns. SOPELEM supplied the basic day version of its SOPTAC 18 fire-control system with laser rangefinder and its control unit. Fives-Cail Babcock provided kits to modify the 105 mm gun and its ammunition system to allow APFSDS rounds to be fired. Work on upgrading the AMX-13s started in Ecuador late in 1988 and was completed in 1990.
Reconnaissance vehicle
EE-3 Jararaca		Brazil	~10	
EE-9 Cascavel		Brazil	~32	
Armoured personnel carriers
AMX-VCI		France	~82	
M113		United States	~20	
EE-11 Urutu		Brazil	~17	
UR-416		West Germany	~32	
Cobra II	CEREMONIA_MILITAR-ENTREGA_DE_VEHÍCULOS_COBRA_II_AL_EJÉRCITO_ECUATORIANO,_QUITO_11_DE_SEPTIEMBRE_DE_2023._-_53181222288	Turkey	~20	

=== Artillery ===
Model	Image	Origin	Caliber	Quantity	Details
Mortar
M29		United States	81mm	~357	
Towed
Model 56 pack		Italy	105mm	~24	
M101		United States	105mm	~36	
M2A2		United States	105mm	~24	
M114		United States	155mm	~12	
M198		United States	155mm	~10	
Self-propelled
Mk F3		France	155mm	~5	
Multiple rocket launchers
BM-21 Grad		Soviet Union	122mm	~18	
RM-70	T813_army2	Czechoslovakia	122mm	~6	

=== Air defence ===
Model	Image	Origin	Caliber	Quantity	Details
Man-portable air-defense systems
9K32 Strela-2		Soviet Union	72mm	n/a	
9K38 Igla		Soviet Union	72mm	n/a	
Blowpipe		United Kingdom	76mm	n/a	
Towed anti-aircraft guns
ZPU-1		Soviet Union	14.5mm	~128	
ZPU-2		Soviet Union	14.5mm	~128	
M-1935		Switzerland	20mm	~28	
M167 Vulcan		United States	20mm	~10	
L/70		Sweden	40 × 365mm	~30	
Self-propelled
M163 Vulcan		United States	20mm	~44	

== Vehicles and small arms ==
Model	Image	Origin	Type	Versions	In service	Notes
Armoured personnel carrier/Infantry mobility vehicles
BLR		Spain	Armoured personnel carrier (wheeled)		35	Status unknown. 4x4
Otokar Ural		Turkey	Tactical wheeled armoured vehicle		15	
Light armored vehicles
Agrale Marruá		Brazil	Transport and recognition	AM10; AM20	130	First lot bought by Ecuador in February 2009 as a reconnaissance variant. Second lot bought in August 2009 as transport variant.
AIL Storm		Israel	Utility	M-240 Storm Mark I	280	4x4
Tiuna		Venezuela	Utility	UR-53AR50	4	Donated by Venezuela in April 2009.
Humvee		United States	Transport; Anti-tank; Anti-aircraft		820	118 Humvees were donated by US NAS in 2003. The Israeli MAPATS anti-tank version was created in 2009. Other anti-tank variants include the Chinese HJ-8 system. In 2013, 107 new units were acquired. Less reliable sources suggest that 500 Humvees are currently in use within the Armed Forces.
Commercial Utility Cargo Vehicle		United States	Commercial utility cargo vehicle	CUCV II	200	The CUCV II was procured by the Ecuadorian military in limited quantities.
Truck
M939 Truck		United States	6×6 truck	Transport	76	Donated by the US NAS program in 2003.
M35		United States	truck	Transport	64	
Hino		Japan	truck	Transport	15	Donated by the US NAS program in 2010.
Unimog		West Germany Germany	4×4 truck	Anti-aircraft warfare	?	Equipped with Anti-tank or Anti-aircraft weapon systems.
Engesa EE-25		Brazil	6×6 truck	Transport	35	In the process of recovery.
Sinotruk HOWO		China	6×6 truck	Transport	293	Multipurpose Trucks.
Sinotruk HOWO		China	4x4 truck	Transport	226	Multipurpose Trucks.
Sinotruk HOWO 336		China	6×4 truck	Water tank	28	
Sinotruk HOWO 336		China	6×4 truck	Fuel tank	20	
Sinotruk HOWO A7		China	6×4 heavy tractor	Tank transporter	27	Head Truck 30T.
Sinotruk HOWO A7		China	6×4 tractor	Transport	35	Mule-type truck 22T.
Sinotruk HOWO 371		China	6×4 tractor	Dump truck	11	12m Cubic.
Sinotruk HOWO		China	4x4 truck	Transport	99	Multipurpose Trucks 3.5T
Sinotruk HOWO		China	4x4 truck	Transport	20	Van truck 5T.
Anti-material warfare
Spike		Israel	Shoulder-launched missile	170mm ATGM	244	Some units are mounted on vehicles. Deliveries started in October 2009.
MAPATS		Israel	Shoulder-launched missile	155mm ATGM	?	Some units are mounted on vehicles.
Euromissile HOT		France; West Germany / Germany	Missile launchers	150mm ATGM	?	Mounted on Aérospatiale Gazelle helicopters.
MILAN		France; West Germany / Germany	Shoulder-launched missile	125mm ATGM	?	Some units are mounted on vehicles.
C90-CR (M3)		Spain	Shoulder-launched missile	90mm RPG	?	
M72 LAW		United States	Shoulder-launched missile	66mm RPG (M-72A-3 LAW)	?	
RPG-7		Soviet Union	Shoulder-launched missile	40mm RPG	?	Used by the Marine Corps.
Anti-aircraft warfare
ZU-23-2		Soviet Union	Towed; Mounted	2 × 23 mm Anti-Aircraft Twin Autocannon Type 85	34	AA System. Some units are mounted on vehicles.
Mobile surface-to-air missile system
9K33 Osa		Soviet Union	Mobile 6x6 amphibious self-propelled	200 mm SAM system	10	
Surface-to-air missile
MBDA Mistral		France	Man-portable air-defense system	90 mm Surface-to-air missile	?	Some are mounted on vehicles. Also used by Marine Corps.
HN-5		China	Man-portable air-defense system	72 mm Surface-to-air missile HN-5A	?	
Small arms
Browning Hi-Power		Belgium	9mm	Pistol	?	
M1911		United States	.45	Pistol	?	
Glock-17		Austria	9mm	Pistol	?	
Type 56		China	7.62mm	Assault rifle	10,000	They will be used for conscript training. Donated by China.
FN FAL		Belgium	7.62mm	Battle rifle	50,000	Former standard rifle of the Army, it was replaced by the HK 33 since 1994, the FN FAL is still used by some units such as Jungle Infantry where the 7.62mm round has its advantages.
SIG SG 540		Switzerland	5.56mm	Battle rifle	?	
M16A2		United States	5.56mm	Assault rifle	?	Colt M16A1, M16A2 & CAR-15A1 (M16A1 carbine delivered.
M4 carbine		United States	5.56mm	Carbine	?	M4s sold as a 2008 Foreign Military Sales package.
Steyr AUG		Austria	5.56mm	Bullpup assault rifle	?	Used also by Ecuadorian UN operatives and jungle warfare units. Delivered between 1987 and 1989.
Daewoo K2		South Korea	5.56mm	Assault rifle	?	
HK 33		West Germany	5.56mm	Assault rifle	33,000+	Used also by Ecuadorian Naval Infantry, Ecuadorian UN operatives, paramilitary units, and the 9th Special Forces Brigade. 30,000 units (produced in England) were delivered in 1994. A further 3,000 units were acquired through Chile. An unknown quantity was purchased from Turkey (HK-33A-2 and HK-33A-3).
HK MP5A5		West Germany Germany	9mm	Submachine gun	?	Used (also) by: Ecuadorian Naval Infantry, Air Force Infantry detachments and the Counter-terror unit GEO. Night-vision and SD versions available.
Uzi		Israel	9mm	Submachine gun	5.000	Used (also) by: Air Force Infantry
PSG-1		West Germany	7.62mm	Sniper rifle	?	
M24 SWS		United States	7.62mm	Sniper rifle	?	
FN MAG		Belgium	7.62mm	General-purpose machine gun	?	
Heckler & Koch HK21		West Germany	5.56mm	General-purpose machine gun	?	
FN Minimi		Belgium	5.56mm	Squad automatic weapon	?	
Daewoo K3		South Korea	5.56mm	Light machine gun	?	
Milkor MGL		South Africa South Africa	40mm	Infantry support weapon	?	
AGS-17		Soviet Union	30mm	Infantry support weapon	?	
Colt M203		United States	40mm	GL		
HK-79A-1		West Germany	40mm	GL		
M1919		United States	.30-06	Infantry support	?	
M2HB		United States	.50 BMG	Anti-material; Infantry support	?	

== Aircraft ==
Aircraft	Image	Origin	Type	Versions	In service	Notes
Trainer aircraft
T-41 Mescalero		United States	Primary pilot trainer	T-41D	2	
Cessna 182		United States	Primary pilot trainer		4	
Utility aircraft
Pilatus PC-6		Swiss; United States	Light transport	Turbo Porter	5	STOL aircraft, the Porter series was produced under license in the States.
Maule M-7		United States	Liaison aircraft	MT-7-235 Super Rocket	3	
Aerial reconnaissance
Cessna Citation II		United States	Aerial survey	550	1	
Transport
Beechcraft Super King Air		United States	Light transport/Utility		3	
IAI Arava		Israel	Light transport	201	2	STOL aircraft.
PZL M28 Skytruck		Poland	Light transport		1	STOL aircraft. Delivered in August 2018 to replace crashed IAI Arava.
CASA C-212 Aviocar		Spain; Indonesia	Tactical transport	400	2	STOL aircraft.
CASA C-235		Spain; Indonesia	Tactical transport		2	
Military helicopter
Airbus H225M Super Puma		France	Medium lift-transport	H225M	2	5 ordered.
Mil Mi-17		Soviet Union; Russia	Medium lift-transport	Mi-17-1V Mi-171E	9 1	
Aérospatiale SA 330 Puma		France	Medium lift-transport	SA.330L AS 332B	6 2	
Aérospatiale AS 332 Super Puma		France; United Kingdom; Europe	Medium lift-transport	332M	12	A total of one unit was delivered. Since then only six are in use. Various sources state that one or a few units might have been acquired in the AS332M variant. It is being planned to modernise, overhaul and upgrade the remaining helicopters until 2018.
Eurocopter AS532 Cougar		France; United Kingdom; Europe	Medium lift-transport	AS532 UL/AL	8	
Bell 412		United States; Canada	Transport/Utility helicopter		4	
Bell 214		United States	Transport/Utility helicopter	214B	1	
Bell 212		United States; Canada	Transport/Utility helicopter		4	
Bell 206		United States; Canada	Light utility helicopter		9	
Eurocopter AS350 Écureuil		France; Europe	Light utility helicopter	AS350 B AS 350B2 AS 350B3	6 1 2	
Eurocopter Fennec		France; Europe	Light attack helicopter/Light utility helicopter	AS550 C3 Fennec AS555 Fennec 2	11 7	

Retired

- Aérospatiale Gazelle - Light attack helicopter/Observation helicopter - SA 342L1 In 2003 only 26 were operational. One (no#E-342) crashed on August 1, 2008, killing the crew. Two crashed on January 24, 2007, killing the Defence Minister. All were equipped with HOT missiles between 1982 and 1983. Remaining helicopters been modernized and improved with Israeli technology . Retired 20 January 2025.
