= EE-3 Jararaca =

Brazilian armored military vehicle

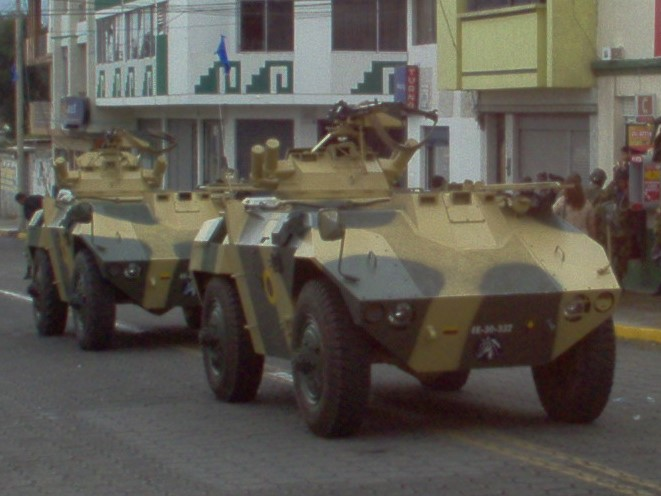
- Ecuadorian Army EE-3s on parade, 2005.
- Type: Scout car
- Place of origin: Brazil

Service history
- Used by: See Operators
- Wars: Iran–Iraq War; Gulf War

Production history
- Designed: 1979
- Manufacturer: Engesa
- Unit cost: USD $82,000 (new)
- Produced: 1982–1990
- Variants: See Variants

Specifications
- Mass: 5.8 tonnes (6.4 short tons; 5.7 long tons)
- Length: 4.16 m (13 ft 8 in)
- Width: 2.23 m (7 ft 4 in)
- Height: 1.56 m (5 ft 1 in) (hull)
- Crew: 3 (commander, gunner, driver)
- Main armament: 12.7mm M2 Browning machine gun (1,000 stowed rounds)
- Engine: Mercedes-Benz OM 314A 4-cylinder water-cooled diesel 120 hp (89 kW) at 2,800 rpm
- Power/weight: 20.7 hp/tonne (14.9 kW/tonne)
- Suspension: Semi-elliptical springs with hydropneumatic shock dampers
- Ground clearance: 0.31m
- Fuel capacity: 135 litres
- Operational range: 750 km
- Maximum speed: 100 km/h (62 mph)

The EE-3 Jararaca is a Brazilian scout car developed for route reconnaissance, liaison, and internal security purposes. It was engineered by Engesa in response to a perceived Brazilian Army requirement for a light armored car capable of replacing its unarmored utility vehicles in the liaison and security role. The first Jararaca prototype appeared in 1979 and serial production commenced in 1982 after extensive operational testing in Brazil. It was ultimately rejected for large scale service with the Brazilian Army due to concerns over the limited mobility of its four-wheeled chassis but achieved some minor successes on the export market.

After the early 1980s, the Jararaca was marketed solely towards potential export customers such as Iraq and Libya, both of which influenced the vehicle's continued development. Nevertheless, much of Engesa's marketing efforts for the Jararaca were stymied by a combination of a trend towards heavier wheeled armored fighting vehicles and a surplus of cheaper light armored cars available to the armies of developing nations, particularly during the final years of the Cold War.

== Development history ==
By the 1960s and 1970s, most modern armies had recognized a niche for armored vehicles in secondary battlefield tasks, such as providing information and rear security for larger mechanized formations. This trend to "mechanize" auxiliary land warfare elements placed an emphasis on the use of light armor to fulfill roles outside the traditional armored doctrine of maneuver and combat. The niche the trend created resulted in the development of new vehicles intended to bridge gaps between tanks or tracked armored personnel carriers above the 7 tonne class and jeep type vehicles under 4 tonnes.

During the late 1970s, the Brazilian Army was still using a variety of unarmored jeep class vehicles for auxiliary tasks in its mechanized formations. In 1977, Engesa began development work on an armored scout car which it intended to market to the army as a potential replacement for the jeep class. The new vehicle was to be built on an extremely compact, four-wheeled chassis capable of being airdropped and engaging in passive reconnaissance or deception. Ideally, it would also be fitted with a single heavy or general-purpose machine gun for self defense. The first prototypes appeared in 1979 and incorporated as many parts as possible from the army's preexisting fleet of Engesa utility trucks to simplify logistics. Between 1981 and 1982 the prototypes were trialed by army officials as the EE-3 Jararaca. Their response was anything but favorable. The Jararaca was rejected for service due to a combination of mechanical problems—apparently due to engineering flaws which had been overlooked in spite of criticism from its own design team—and its 4X4 configuration, which limited mobility. Nevertheless, Engesa received some interest from potential export customers, ensuring the program remained viable for that market. The Iraqi Army played a major role in creating the economy of scale necessary to push the Jararaca into serial production; in 1981 it ordered 280 from Engesa. Small numbers were subsequently purchased by Gabon, Uruguay, and Ecuador. The Cypriot National Guard, then in the process of a major modernization program amid tensions sparked by the 1983 Northern Cypriot declaration of independence, accounted for the next major order of Jararacas. The Cypriots were not especially interested in the vehicle's utility as a scout car and modified their Jararacas with MILAN anti-tank guided missiles, converting them into tank destroyers used to support the heavier EE-9 Cascavels in their light armored units. Engesa subsequently began fitting all Jararacas with a filtering system designed to enable their crews to operate in a nuclear, chemical, and biological (NBC) warfare environment; this was apparently in response to pressure from another potential export customer, Libya, which had expressed an interest in the vehicle type. Libya later entered into negotiations to purchase 180 Jararacas once it was satisfied the specified alterations had been carried out; however, the Central Intelligence Agency (CIA) theorized that the vehicles were intended for a third party such as Iran.

At the end of the 1980s, Engesa found the Jararaca increasingly non-competitive as it had to compete with a surplus of other light armored vehicles appearing on the international market in the wake of the 1989 Revolutions and the reduction of Cold War tensions. Furthermore, the market was increasingly skewed towards heavier wheeled armored fighting vehicles, which had become more readily available to the armies of developing nations. An unrelated financial crisis forced Engesa to suspend its operations in 1990 and by 1993 production of Jararaca was formally terminated.

== Service history ==
Iraq deployed its Jararacas during the Iran–Iraq War and the subsequent Gulf War. The Jararaca did not enter service with the reconnaissance platoons of Iraqi armored divisions—a role typically filled by the BRDM-2 and Panhard AML—but was favored by Iraqi infantry divisions which also operated other Engesa vehicles such as the EE-11 Urutu armored personnel carrier. Deploying the Jararaca with units that were equipped primarily with Engesa vehicles also helped simplify logistics and training on the divisional level, a crucial factor in an army which acquired its hardware from as many diverse sources as Iraq.

Iran also possessed a fleet of Jararacas during the Iran-Iraq War; it is unclear whether these vehicles were captured from Iraq or acquired from another external supplier. In 1984, when Libya was in negotiations to purchase 180 Jararacas from Engesa, the CIA suspected that the vehicles were actually intended for Iran or a similar third party. Libya did export 130 unidentified armored vehicles of Brazilian origin to Iran at some point prior to 1987. This was not considered a violation of any end-user agreement because Engesa had refused to place restrictive conditions on the resale or transfer of its products purchased by Libya.

Although the Brazilian Army had initially rejected the Jararaca for service, it received a number of Engesa's prototypes, pre-production vehicles, and working demonstrators as a result of that company's closure in 1993. Among these was a Jararaca equipped for NBC detection, which was adopted by the 13th Mechanized Cavalry Regiment based in Pirassununga.

== Description ==
Illustration of an EE-3 Jararaca lifted from a US Military recognition plate

The EE-3 Jararaca's hull is of electro-slag refined steel which provides ballistic protection against artillery fragments and small arms fire. The driving compartment is located in the front of the hull and to the left. It is provided with three periscopes and a single piece hatch cover. Immediately behind the driving compartment is a crew compartment which accommodates up to two additional personnel. One crew member is seated at the right rear, which also doubles as the gunner's station, and the other at the left rear, where most of the vehicle's internal communications equipment is located. The gunner's station is provided with a single 12.7mm Browning M2 heavy machine gun, which could be mounted in a fully enclosed turret or simply on an open ring mount. Various models were proposed which replaced the heavy machine gun mounting with twin general-purpose machine guns, a 20 mm autocannon, a 60 mm gun-mortar, or a bank for launching anti-tank guided missiles. Both crew members have access to roof hatches over their respective seating positions. The crew usually embarks and debarks through a door opening forwards in the right side of the hull.

The Jararaca is fitted with a Mercedes-Benz OM 314A, 4-cylinder, turbocharged engine housed at the hull rear. Transmission is manual and consists of a two-speed Clark Model 240 V mechanical gearbox with one reverse and five forward gears. Both the gearbox and the engine type were selected because they were considered "off the shelf" commercial components also used by the civilian automotive industry in Brazil. Being the first four-wheeled armored vehicle produced by Engesa, the Jararaca lacked the articulated "boomerang" suspension usually characteristic of that firm's vehicle range. Its front and rear beam axles are fitted with the more conventional semi-elliptical leaf springs, as well as hydraulic shock absorbers. The axles also have hypoid gears. Standard equipment included a central tire pressure regulation system that allowed the driver to adjust the tire pressure depending on the terrain. Tire pressure on roads was typically set at 2.5 kg/cm^{2}.

=== External ===
The Jararaca resembles both the EE-11 Urutu and the EE-9 Cascavel in that it possesses a sharply sloping glacis plate, which recedes into a horizontal hull roof line. Its headlamps are recessed and the driver's hatch protrudes from the hull roof over the glacis plate. The sides of the hull are vertical with an odd symmetrical sloping plane between the hull sides and roof. Turrets and ring mountings for various forms of armament are always located atop the hull and slightly to the right due to the position of the turret ring.

== Variants ==
- EE-3 Tank Destroyer: Variant developed for Cyprus which carries a pintle-mounted, single-tube launcher for MILAN anti-tank guided missiles with a range of 2,000 metres.
- EE-3 NBC Reconnaissance: Variant which included detection equipment for a wide variety of chemical and biological agents and eliminated the driver's hatch in favor of a slightly raised glacis plate with three vision blocks for maximum situational awareness. Only one prototype was built; it was adopted by the Brazilian Army's 13th Mechanized Cavalry Regiment.

A number of other variants were proposed but did not actually reach prototype form, including Jararacas fitted with 20 mm autocannon, twin machine guns, or a 60 mm gun-mortar.

== Operators ==
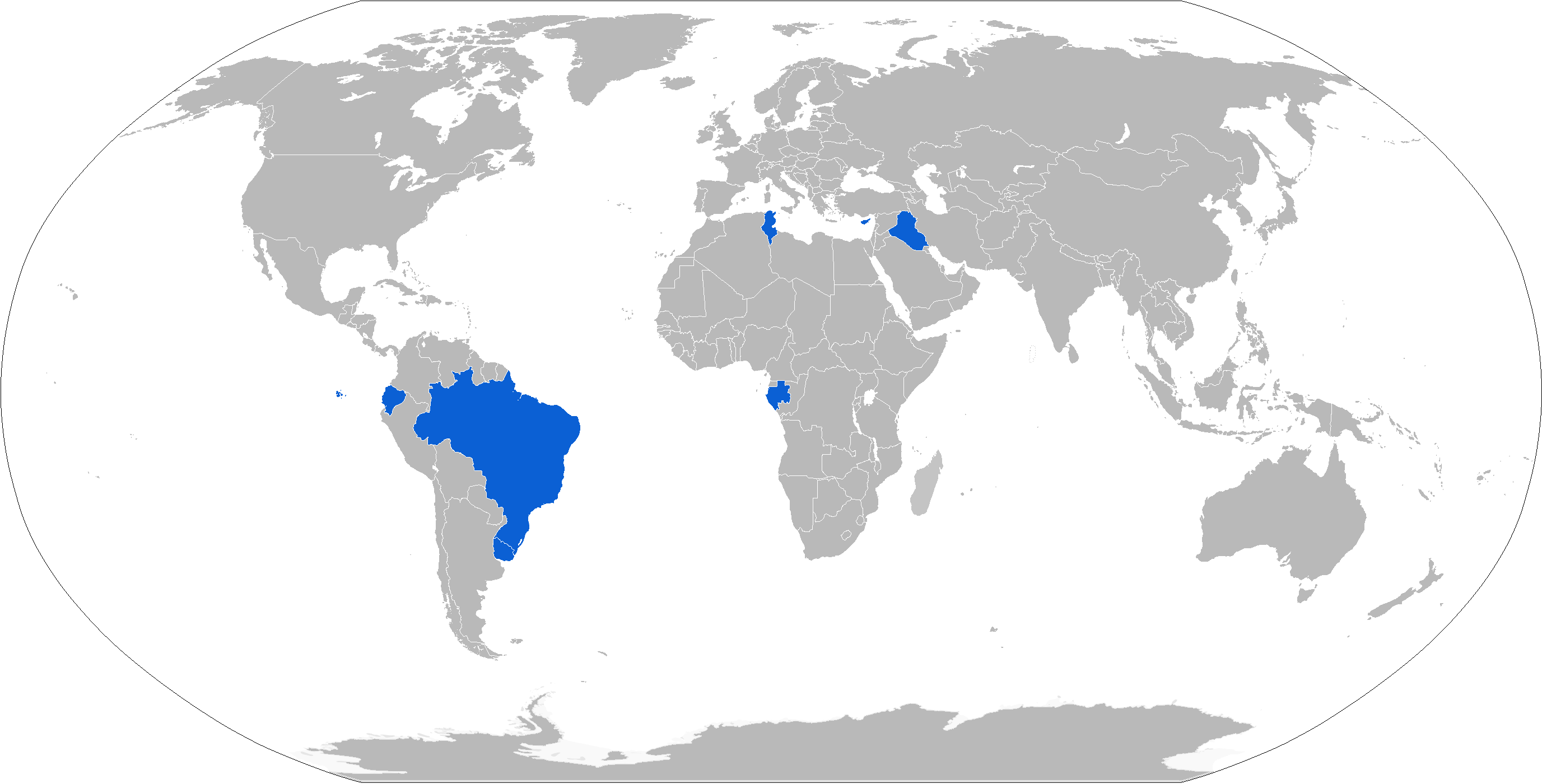
Map of EE-3 operators in blue

- Cyprus: 36
- Ecuador: 10
- Gabon: 12
- Uruguay: 16

=== Former operators ===
- Brazil
- Iraq: 280
- Iran: 67

== See also ==
=== Engesa series ===
- EE-9 Cascavel
- EE-11 Urutu
- EE-T1 Osório

=== Vehicles of comparable role, performance, and era ===
- Daimler Ferret
- BRDM-2
- D-442 FÚG
- Véhicule Blindé Léger
