= Engesa =

Former Brazilian defence industry company

Engesa Engenheiros Especializados S.A.
- Type: Sociedade Anônima
- Industry: Defence; automotive, oil
- Founded: 1958
- Founder: José Luiz Whitaker Ribeiro
- Defunct: 1993
- Fate: Bankrupt
- Headquarters: São Paulo, Brazil; Barueri, Brazil (after 1985)
- Products: Civilian and military vehicles
- Number of employees: 10,000 (June 1987); 11,000

Engenheiros Especializados S.A., doing business as Engesa, was a Brazilian automotive and defense company headquartered in the state of São Paulo. Founded in 1958 by engineer José Luiz Whitaker Ribeiro, it produced jeeps, trucks, off-road vehicles, tractors, and armored vehicles for both civilian and military markets. Its military vehicles were sold to the Brazilian Armed Forces and to over eighteen countries, particularly in the Middle East, and were still employed in conflicts into the 21st century. At its peak in the 1970s and 1980s, Engesa was recognized as one of the "big three" in Brazil's defense industry, alongside Avibras and Embraer, but it could not withstand the sector's crisis in the late 1980s and went bankrupt in 1993.

Starting as a supplier of parts for the oil industry, Engesa moved into modifying trucks, established ties with the military, and in 1972 received technology from the Brazilian Army for two armored vehicles to begin production. These vehicles, designated the EE-9 Cascavel and EE-11 Urutu, were 6x6 wheeled vehicles featuring the company's patented "boomerang" suspension system. As relatively simple and low-cost armored vehicles, they became export successes in the developing world, along with the EE-25 truck. Export contracts were secured through informal negotiation channels, adaptability to customer requirements, and indifference to how buyers used the vehicles—many of whom faced difficulties importing from the developed world. Iraq and Libya were the largest customers.

Engesa's formula combined ad hoc management, aggressive recruitment of human resources, close ties with military, diplomatic, and technocratic authorities during the Brazilian military dictatorship, and the rhetoric of the company's importance to national security. A sales drop in 1981 nearly bankrupted the company. In the following years, Engesa diversified its activities, including the production of the Engesa 4 jeep, its most well-known civilian product, though civilian lines received less attention from upper management. The acquisition of subsidiaries raised the number of employees to its peak—around 10,000—in the mid-1980s. The company pursued a technological leap with the development of the EE-T1 Osório main battle tank, built primarily with foreign components to compete in the high-end international market.

These investments, however, put the company in debt just as international demand dropped with the end of the Iran-Iraq War and the Cold War. Additionally, Brazilian state support waned with the country's return to democracy. The company's debts could only have been resolved through a major contract for the Osório tank, which never materialized. By 1988, Engesa was already in a pre-bankruptcy state and losing credibility. Its bankruptcy marked a turning point in the crisis of Brazil's defense industry, and experts still debate whether and how it could have been avoided. At the time, the company's leadership blamed external circumstances for the crisis, while analysts pointed to financial and administrative deficiencies that had not been addressed during the golden years of exports.

== Entry into the market ==
Engesa emerged as a micro-enterprise, founded by José Luiz Whitaker Ribeiro, a graduate in mechanical engineering at USP's Polytechnic School, and other engineers from USP in 1958. The company had eight employees, including its shareholders. In 1963 it was incorporated as a company with capital from São Paulo. Its initial activities were the maintenance and production of parts for oil industry equipment. Its customers were the União Refinery, in Capuava, followed by those in Cubatão, Duque de Caxias and Mataripe, the latter in Bahia. Demand grew with the oil development of Bahia, resulting in the expansion to two hundred employees four years after its foundation, the purchase of machining equipment and the development of its own products. The main ones were oil pumping rods. New customers arrived: Petrobras' maritime terminals in Madre de Deus (Bahia) and Ilha d'Água (Rio de Janeiro).

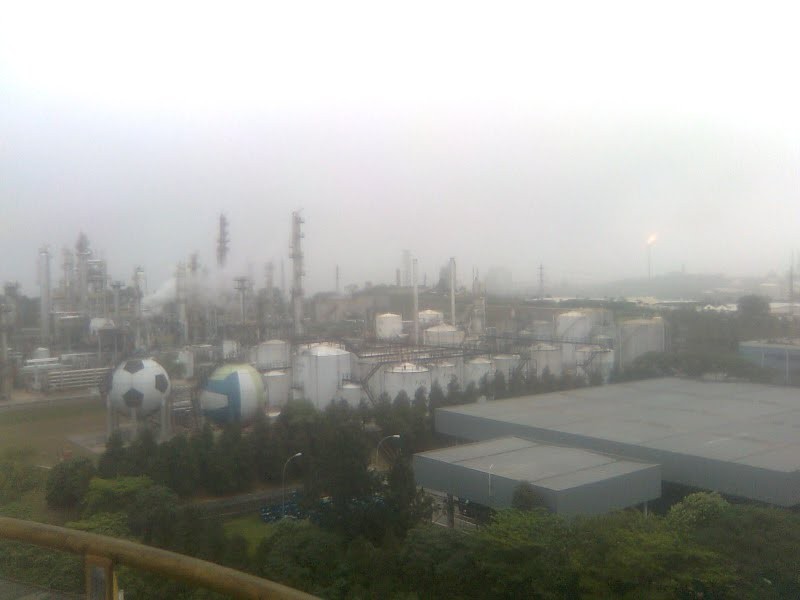
The Capuava refinery, Engesa's first customer

Trucks and utility vehicles frequently broke down on the harsh roads to their destinations in Brazil's northeast, leading to Engesa's "homemade solution" of a suspension and traction system. It impressed the people at Petrobras, who started requisitioning the vehicles for rough and slippery terrain during the rainy seasons. In 1966 the company patented its 4x4, then 6x4 and 6x6 traction system, as "Total Traction", giving great off-road performance to trucks and pickups from Chevrolet, Ford and later Dodge. In 1969, the "Boomerang" double rear wheel drive was launched, capable of keeping the rear wheels in permanent contact with the ground. (Note: According to the version cited in Degl'lesposti 2006, the suspension was not created by Engesa, but by IME captain and engineer Valter Finato Catarino, who worked at VBB.) It was an off-road technological asset and was used in future projects, giving a competitive advantage, although it was expensive, heavy and could not support high loads.

Its artisanal advances outside the sector would expand its customers to the automotive sector, such as General Motors, Ford and the Brazilian Army itself: an officer would have seen a vehicle modified by the company, its vehicles were subjected to tests and as a result it received 100 army GMC trucks for repowering in 1968. Then, contacts with Brazilian Navy officers who had studied motor mechanics in the army made it possible to adapt the suspension and traction of Marine Corps trucks as well. At first they broke down, but after successive repairs in São Paulo they were in good condition, leading to more contracts. Repowering was a necessity, as all 4x4 and 6x6 vehicles were imported.

Engesa adapted 960 vehicles in 1968 and 1,371 two years later. The Ford F-600, Chevrolet C-60 gasoline and diesel D-60 received all-axle drive, reinforced bumpers and military lights. In addition to repowering trucks, the company entered the armored vehicle segment at the turn of the 1960s, producing the transfer and traction box for the Brazilian Viatura Blindada Brasileira or VBB I, a 4x4 reconnaissance vehicle to succeed the M8 Greyhound. In 1972 the number of employees reached four hundred.

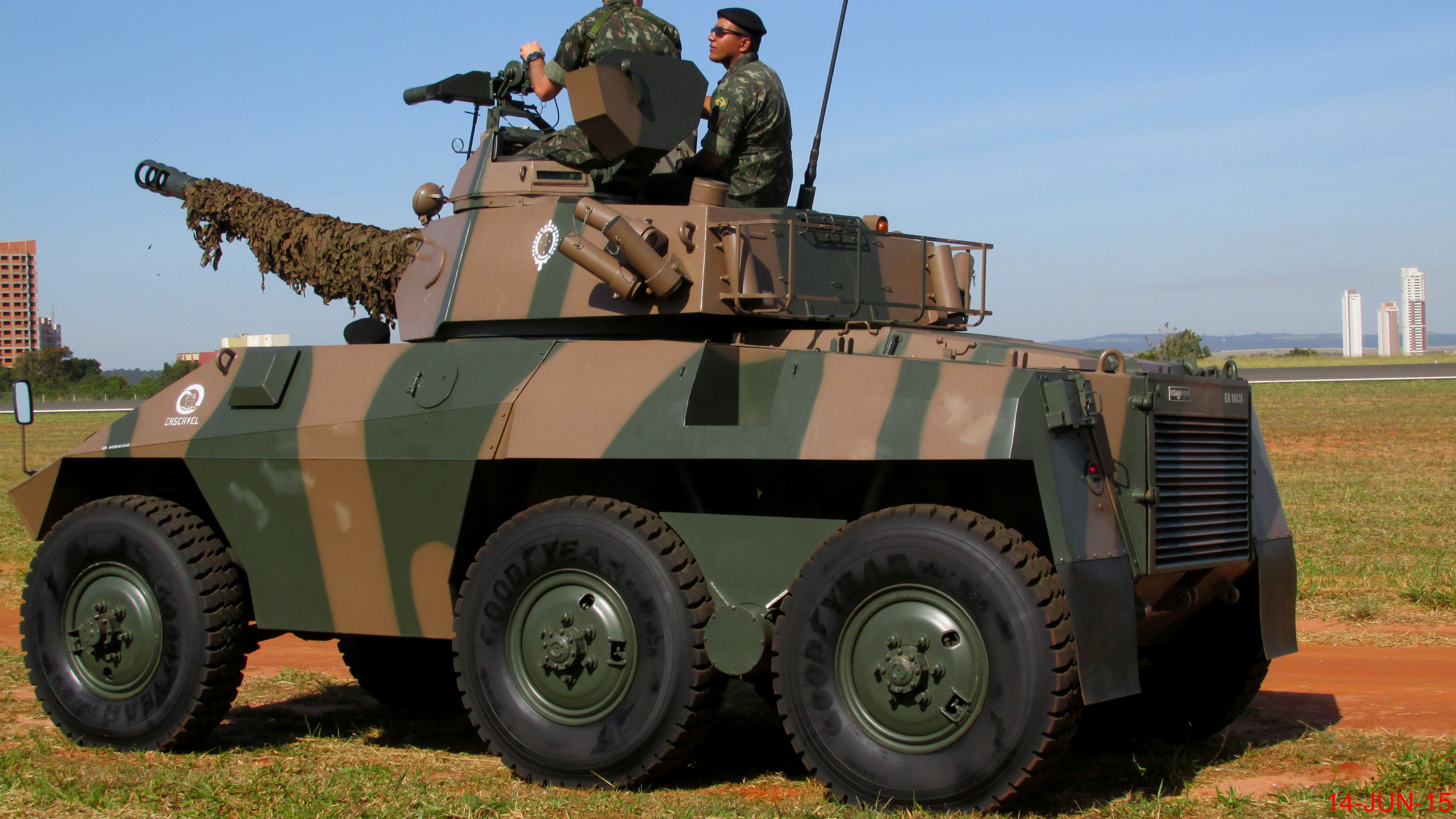
EE-9 Cascavel armored reconnaissance vehicle

When Engesa entered the defense sector, a modernization program was taking place driven by the alliance of the Brazilian Armed Forces with industrialists, state-owned companies and multinationals. It formed a military-industrial complex, which became one of the largest in the Third World during Brazil's military dictatorship, with a strong presence in this international market. Defense companies received demand from the country's Armed Forces, intellectual products from universities and research centers (such as the Army Technological Center) and subsidies and credit from government institutions. The army was undergoing a reorganization of its order of battle, creating a mechanized cavalry that would be furnished with Engesa's armored vehicles.

The collaboration of the Brazilian Army and the State in the development of Engesa occurred in the financial and research and development fields. The latter was especially relevant in the initial stage, marked by improvisation, decreasing later with the accumulation of experience and the shift to the foreign market. One example was the labor of officers from the Military Institute of Engineering (IME), who were rewarded with unaccounted "gifts", such as food baskets and money. Such exchange of favors is common in the arms industry due to its dependence on government institutions. Official support was assured by skill in the field of politics, in which Whitaker personally participated. In 1982 he was appointed president of IMBEL; it was a way of energizing the state-owned company, which had "a certain character of a public department". IMBEL began to live in "symbiosis" with Engesa.

== Products ==
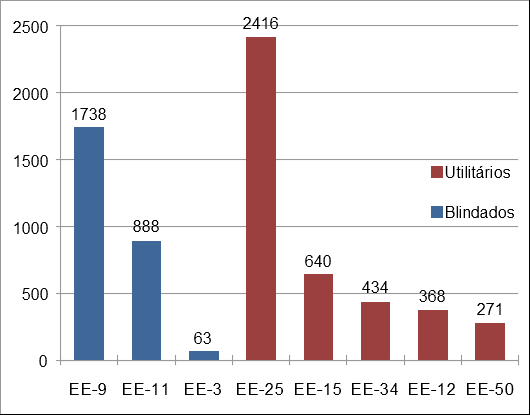
Engesa's total production of military vehicles

In June 1971, the VBB, now called "Wheeled Reconnaissance Car" (CRR), had its studies, project and industrial designs transferred to Engesa so that it could begin production. The transfer is common in developed countries, but in Brazil it was a milestone. The choice of Engesa and not Bernardini to take over the armored vehicle was due Whitaker's openly nationalist and sympathetic views to Brazil's dictatorship, as well as being a friend of lieutenant colonel Pedro de Mello, the commander of the Working Group of Automobile Engineers. The inherited technology became the 6x6 EE-9 Cascavel reconnaissance vehicle, (Note: EE is an abbreviation for Engesa, 9 was the weight in tons and "cascavel" is a Brazilian snake.) initially with a 37mm cannon and later with a 90mm cannon.

Another transfer of technology, initiated at the Regional Motor Mechanization Park of the 2nd Military Region (PqRMM/2), was the Amphibious Troop Transport Car (CTTA), also 6x6, armed with a machine gun turret. It became the EE-11 Urutu in the hands of Engesa, which equipped both with its "Boomerang" suspension. Combined production reached thousands of vehicles, being the company's most numerous armored vehicles. They have seen combat in current conflicts such as the Iraqi Civil War (2011–2017) and the Libyan Civil War (2014–present).

Sales of adaptation kits for trucks declined in the late 1970s, with the latest successes being transport platforms for Scania models and trailers for Mercedes. The experience gained allowed the development of Engesa's own version of the GMC truck, the EE-25, designed hastily together with the EE-15 to accompany the sale of the Cascavel and Urutu, thus offering "complete packages". They were launched in 1974 and were capable of 1.5 or 2.5 tons off-road or double that on regular roads. The EE-25 was the best-selling vehicle, exceeding the production of the Cascavel or Urutu. The line of military "utilities" was completed by the EE-50, a 6x6 with a capacity of five tons (ten on a regular basis) from the late 1970s; the EE-34, a pickup truck using technology from Envemo, purchased in 1983; and the EE-12 or Engesa 4, a jeep presented in 1984. Rustic and with good off-road performance, it became the company's most successful product in the civilian market.

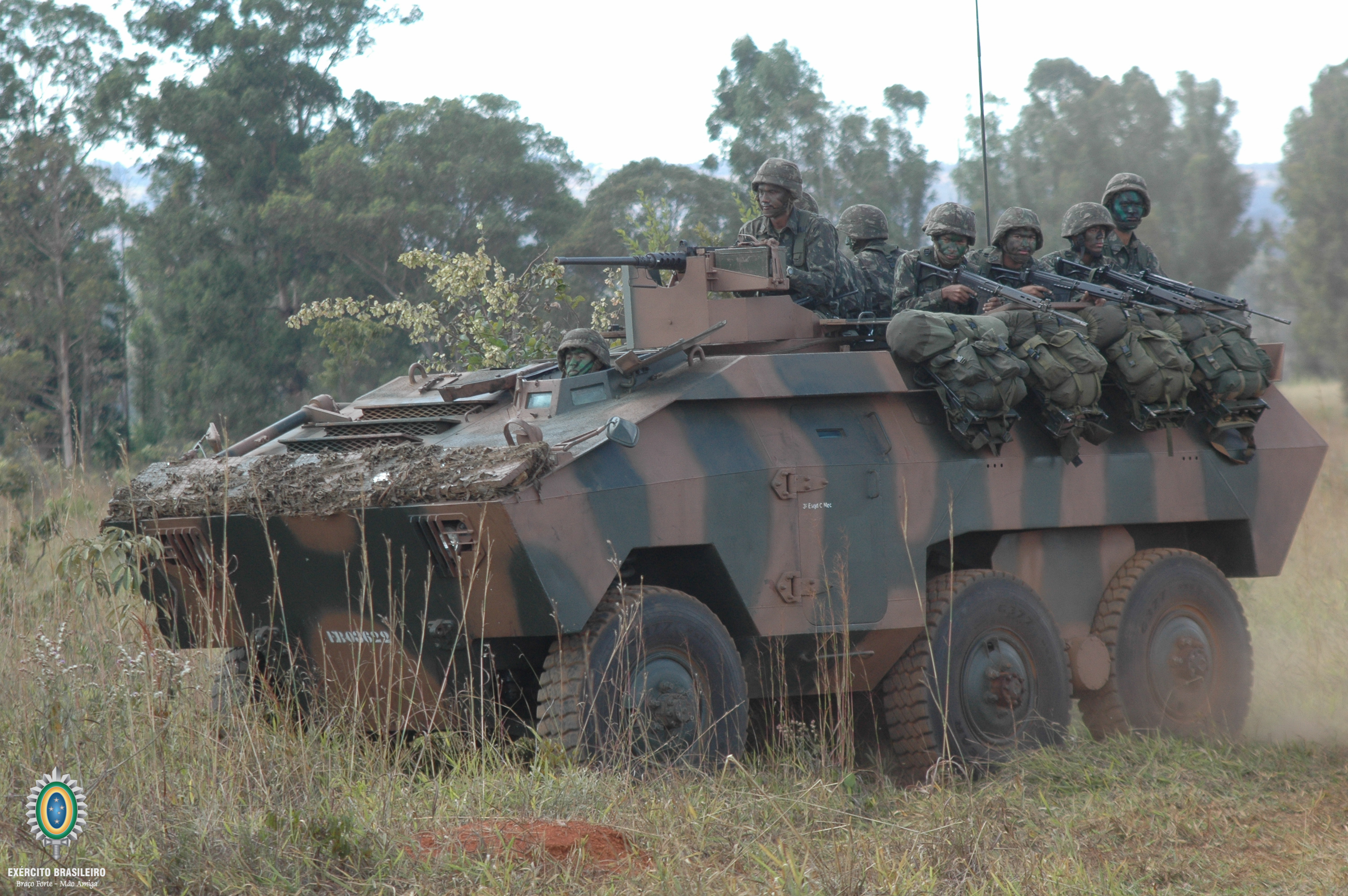
EE-11 Urutu armored transport

The EE-15 also had a civilian version, but its price was not competitive. Exclusive to this market, the EE-510 was announced in 1976, an articulated forestry tractor with a capacity of ten tons and seven meter logs. It did not sell much because it was a niche product in the reforestation of paper and cellulose industries, such as Aracruz Celulose and Klabin S.A. In 1981, the EE-1124, a 14.5 ton 4x4 agricultural tractor, was launched, with the EE-1128 version, with a turbo engine, and its equivalent without a cabin, the EE-1428, in the following years. The agricultural ones were the largest on the market, expensive and of high quality. Both forestry and agricultural production were highly nationalized. The fall in military exports, culminating in the 1981 crisis, resulted in an effort to diversify. The production of tractors designed years earlier, with financing from Finep and utilities, expanded, from 1983 onwards, the domestic market's share of sales. However, civil lines received less attention from senior management, being, in the words of a company interviewee, the "ugly ducklings".

The line of wheeled armored vehicles continued with the EE-17 Sucuri tank destroyer, mounting a 105 mm cannon on the Cascavel chassis. Presented in 1977, it was a technical failure. When the Sucuri II, an improved version, appeared a decade later, the market was already taken over by the Austrian SK-105 Kürassier and there was no series production. The other wheeled vehicle, the small EE-3 Jararaca reconnaissance vehicle, also had technical limitations, but a small quantity was produced.

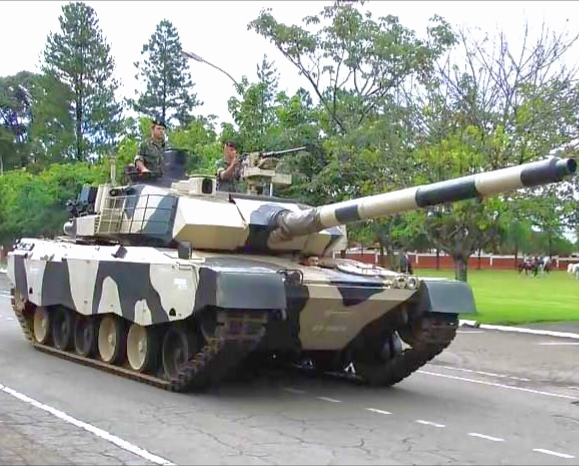
Osório tank

Bernardini, Biselli, Novatraction, Gurgel and Moto Peças were competitors in the Brazilian market, although smaller. Among them, Bernardini worked in the tracked vehicle sector, designing a combat vehicle for the Brazilian Army, the Tamoyo, since 1979. Aiming to conquer the tracked market, in 1982 Engesa decided to develop its own combat vehicle, the Osório. However, its main target was Saudi Arabia, which had opened an international competition for a new main battle tank. Advanced, Osório performed on par with its major power competitors in tests, but the Saudis ended up choosing the M1 Abrams in 1991 — possibly just feigning interest in the Osório to lower the price of the Abrams. The other tracked vehicle, the EE-T4 Ogum, a light air transportable vehicle, did not generate enough interest to go beyond the prototype phase.

Successes such as Cascavel and Urutu were characterized by "simple and flexible design concepts, low cost, good performance and reliability, easy handling and simple maintenance", results of Brazilian industry conditions; the low price was a result of the use of civilian components, especially trucks. Their demonstrated performance from the Egyptian–Libyan War (1977) and especially the Iran-Iraq War (1980–1988) then provided "real marketing". The presence of armored vehicles since before the start of the Iran-Iraq War guaranteed the following batches. With products suited to the needs of Third World buyers and battle proven, Engesa was able to capture value. In the 1980s, however, its civilian lines conquered limited markets. In the military sector, it reached a higher technological level (Osório), but was unable to achieve sales.

The eight military vehicles that Engesa produced in series — armored vehicles EE-3, EE-9 and EE-11 and utility vehicles EE-12, EE-15, EE-25, EE-34 and EE-50 — together numbered a total of 6,818 units. It is a lower number than those published at the time, such as Whitaker Ribeiro's claims that, in 1979, he produced half of the equipment in operation in the world in his sector, having the "largest company producing armored cars on wheels of the free world" and selling 5,000 units by 1985 (Defence & Armament magazine then estimated less than 1,700 which was not denied).

== Customers ==
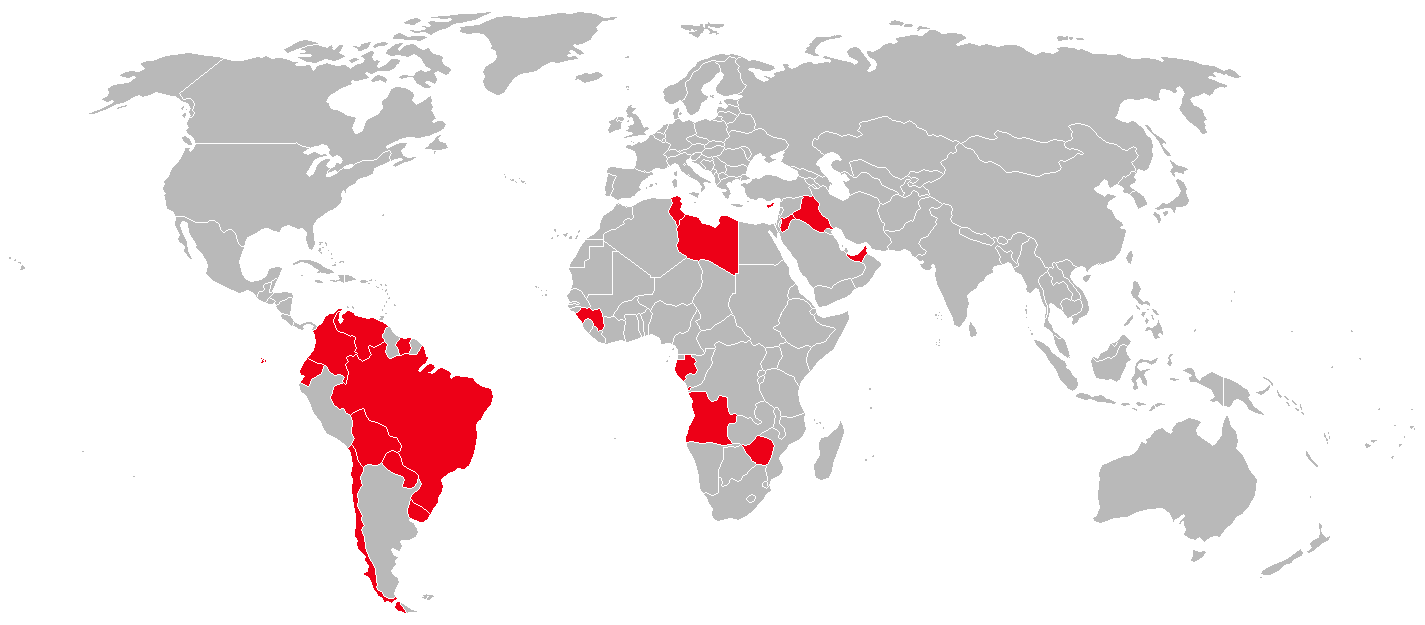
Engesa's buyers of military vehicles

In the 1970s and 1980s the global arms market, characteristically concentrated in the hands of great powers with high technological capacity, underwent relative diversification: other powers and even some Third World countries began winning export contracts. The 1973 oil crisis boosted demand from buyers in the Middle East. Among its suppliers was the Brazilian industry. It had an export character, as demand from the Brazilian Armed Forces was limited. Brazil reached tenth place among armaments suppliers, representing less than 1% of total exports.

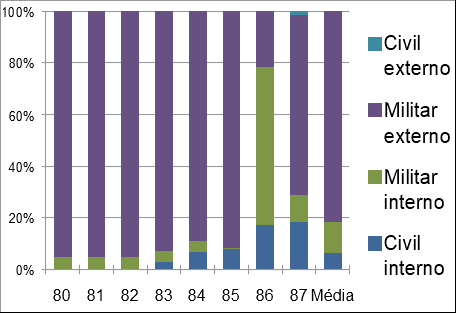
Production destinations, 1980-1987

The "super sophistication" of the great powers' armaments created a niche: there was not much need for technological sophistication in the armored sector. Underdeveloped countries were limited not only in budget but also in educational level and time to train technical staff, so that the already described "rusticity" of Brazilian products made them attractive to this category of buyers. Little attention was paid to this market, leaving space for Brazilians.

Engesa realized the insufficiency of internal demand in the early 1970s, when it already had Cascavel and Urutu. At the same time, it had long had an eye on the foreign market, concluding from analysis of the 1967 Six-Day War that it would be able to compete with Soviet vehicles. The first contracts were signed with Iraq and Libya, and the Brazilian Army was crucial in covering the bureaucratic work and bringing Whitaker closer to Muammar al-Gaddafi, the Libyan dictator. For the remainder of its existence, there would be 18 countries in addition to Brazil. Its insertion into the foreign market was marked by versatility. At first, contracts were signed with the technology still incomplete, to the point where the first Libyan Cascavels arrived without armor; it was a risk made possible by the support of the Brazilian Army. Negotiations had a level of "informality" and were followed by after-sales support.

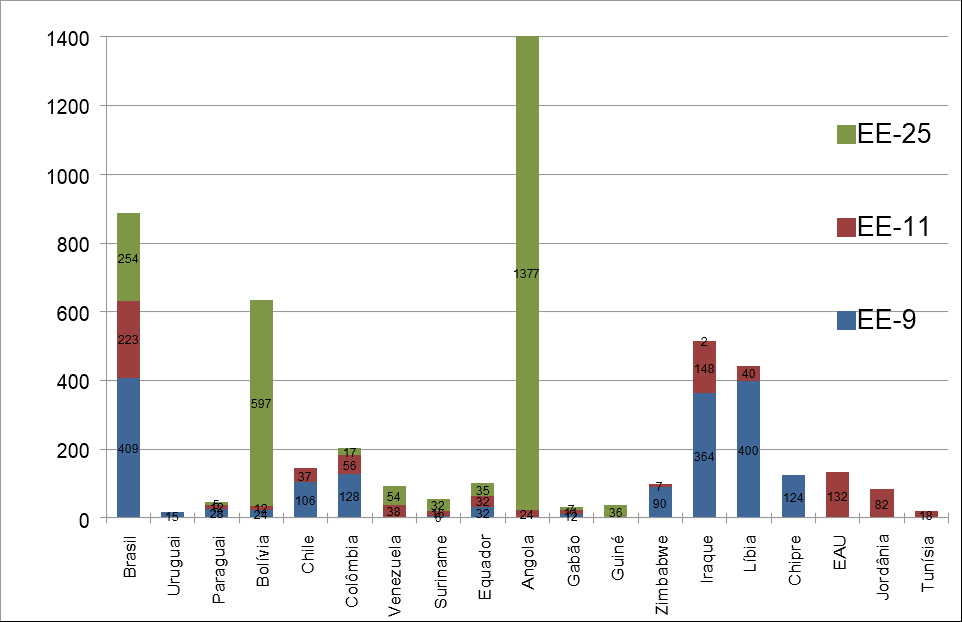
Sales of Cascavel, Urutu and EE-25 by country

In Iraq, the modus operandi was to speed up negotiations through informal channels, despite the risks involved in directly exposing officials to ambassadors, ministers and generals. The willingness to modify the product to customer requirements was greater than that existing among European suppliers, and parts for weapons of other origins were also sold, such as Soviet T tanks and MiG fighters. The ideological distance between Brazilians and Iraqis was smaller: when customers made mistakes, the "Brazilians, instead of criticizing the Iraqis, remembered that they had made the same mistakes about five years ago and said: let's get it right, let's correct this situation", according to an interviewee from the company. Given the illiteracy of the Iraqi soldiers operating the Cascavel, the projectile cases were given different colors to facilitate identification and the training was recorded and delivered on video. Whitaker and Delfim Neto even visited the country, with the president of Engesa checking out the front line.

Several Third World countries, such as Libya, Iraq and Iran, had difficulty buying from first world nations because of their "own dubious activities", such as the transfer of arms from Libya to the Provisional IRA in the 1970s. Engesa was successful by not caring about how buyers used the vehicles and who their buyers were, including countries under international sanctions. The United States took a dim view of the sales because they took place without conditions of use — part of what was sold to Libya went to rebels in Western Sahara and Chad (Note: See Western Sahara conflict and Chadian–Libyan War.) — and created a risk of disseminating technology to hostile countries in the Third World or even to the Soviet Union. The CIA monitored Engesa's production via satellite. Libya also passed it on to Iran. Regarding its policy of not restricting the use of products, not imposing end-user certificates, Whitaker declared that resale is a "sovereign act that cannot be controlled". The largest exporters themselves already violate the principle. In response to U.S. criticism of the Libyan sales, Whitaker also reportedly called Gaddafi a "highly intelligent and balanced person".

== Organizational culture ==
Human resources were aggressively captured: the company looked for the most qualified professionals on the market and offered salaries up to two or three times higher than what they received. The preference was for an undergraduate degree at USP's Polytechnic School and a postgraduate degree at Getúlio Vargas Foundation (FGV); José Guilherme, the president's younger brother, graduated from the Polytechnic School, joined the company in 1969 and invited colleagues to work in the following years. Some researchers studied for a doctorate abroad. Training was offered according to the needs of the moment. The number of technicians, designers and engineers reached 600. Engineering was divided into experimental, for prototypes, and production, for "drawings, lists of materials, standards and specifications". In order not to lose engineers in managerial positions, the "Y-shaped career" was adopted: technical positions could reach the same salaries as managerial ones. Likewise, managers were not afraid to hire very competent technicians who could take their place. Throughout the 1970s, management, especially finance, fell behind, unable to keep up with the development of engineering.

Employees abroad, such as in Iraq, received bonuses for unhealthy and/or hazardous conditions of up to 300%. There they operated as cross functional teams. Benefits such as health insurance and a car were generous, especially for management level and above, and even existed in the form of status symbols, such as "better restaurant to eat in, room — with or without a door, with glass or without glass." In exchange for what they had, employees were committed to the goals, even participating in collective efforts. Information about union activities was shared with the military through the Paraíba Valley Community Security Center, which existed from at least 1983 to 1985.

Planning, execution and control were not systematic; management was ad hoc, "low training for problem solving, using quick analysis and no learning". At its center was Whitaker's "entrepreneurial, political, and sales skills." He had a great influence on employees with his charisma and ambition, imprinting his personal characteristics on the company's culture. In the mid-80s he imposed his decisions, contradicting vice-presidents and directors. Ad hoc management was successful at first, when the company was simple and the environment was favorable, but in the 1980s it could not handle the increasing complexity and Whitaker was unable to maintain control, having in the final stages lost practical administrative control. Wrong assessments were made.

== Divisions ==
Production activities were carried out at the company's headquarters in São Paulo until its transfer in September 1974 to the new factory built on land negotiated with the city of São José dos Campos, later called Engesa Viaturas. Shortly before, the company had purchased another plant in Salvador. Acquisitions, number of employees and facilities increased in the 1980s. Engesa became the holding company for a group of many other companies or sub-companies, classified as industrial production divisions (IPD) and service divisions (SD). After 1985 the child companies gained more decision-making autonomy. The parent company had 3,748 employees in 1987. The performance of the divisions was hampered by managerial inexperience and disregard for cultural and production incompatibilities between them, which did not necessarily increase Engesa's competitive advantage. Diversification thus resulted in organizational fragmentation.

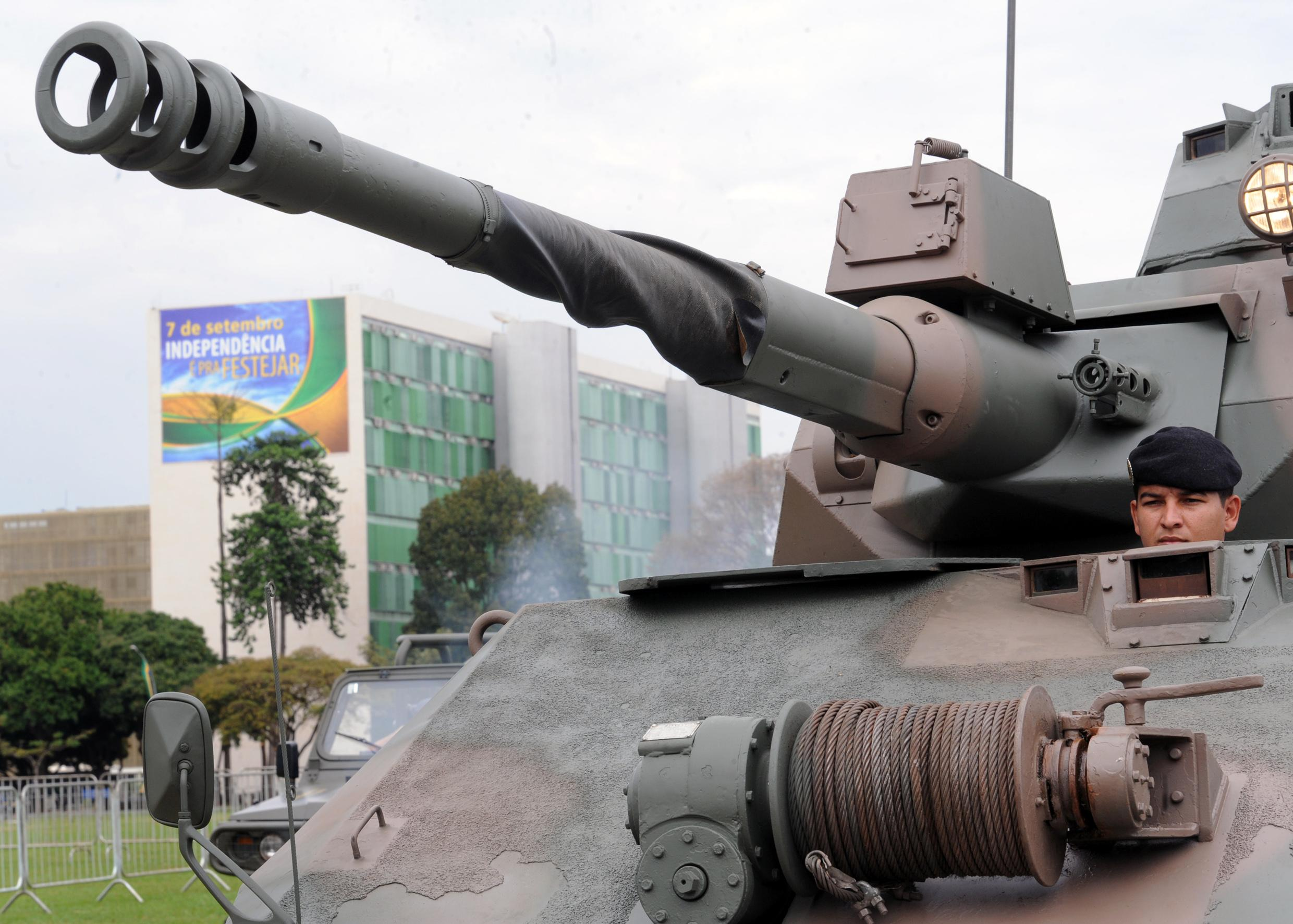
Cascavel's 90mm cannon

=== IPDs ===
- Engesa Viaturas (1979, São José dos Campos): Location of conversion and production of military and civil vehicles.
- Engex S.A Equipamentos Especializados (1973, Salvador): In 1972 the Allis Chalmers factory in Salvador, capable of producing certain gears and transmissions, was purchased. The plant was responsible for machining activities and the production of truck adaptation kits and transfer boxes, the latter of which had quality problems due to the company's focus on large military contracts. Salvador was the major oil hub in Brazil at the time and at the end of the 70s, Petrobras needed to reduce imports due to the valued dollar. Thus, Engex produced sucker rods, downhole pumps and small and medium-sized pumping units. The first ones were exported. It later manufactured 90mm cannons for the Cascavel. It reached 1,111 employees in 1985–6.
- Engesa Química S.A. (Engequímica) (1979, Juiz de Fora): Manufactured 90mm ammunition for the Cascavel with Belgian and Engesa technology and an IMBEL plant. It increased production to 20-30 thousand rounds per month and expanded to other types of ammunition, such as mortar and 105mm, and managed to export to Cyprus, Venezuela and Zambia. It had 754 employees in 1984.
- Engesa FNV (1983, Cruzeiro): The FNV (Fábrica Nacional de Vagões) Veículos e Equipamentos S.A., a traditional company in the railway sector, also worked with trucks and buses and controlled Fruehauf, a manufacturer of trailers, semi-trailers and implements for trucks and containers. It had been in deficit since 1981. It was purchased for US$20 million. Under Engesa it reached 3,866 employees in 1986.
- Engesa Eletrônica S.A. (Engetrônica) (1982 or 1983, São Paulo): Created with 70% participation from Engesa and the remainder from Philips do Brasil to produce embedded systems for the Osório and aircraft such as the AMX and Tucano. It had 212 employees in 1985. Its products were both civilian and military and included tactical radios and navigation systems.
- Engesa Equipamentos Elétricos S.A. (Engelétrica) (1982, Jandira): At the beginning of the year, Engesa acquired controlling interest in Bardella Borriello Eletromecânica S.A, existing since 1911 and responsible for overhead cranes and wire drawing, sectors in which Engesa had no experience. In 1984 it was subordinated to the FNV. It manufactured electric motors and had 692 employees in 1986.

=== SD's ===
- Engeagro (1977): Sold agricultural equipment.
- Transgesa Transportes Engesa Ltda. (1983 or 1984): Redesignation of Transportadora Comercial FNV Ltda. in November 1984. It transported cargo by road.
- Engevideo (1977): Created to serve Iraqi soldiers, it produced videotapes and training programs.
- Aero Brasil (1983): Formed in association with Transbrasil, whose founder, Omar Fontana, was a long-time advisor to Engesa, for air cargo transport. One of their 707s, converted into VIP transport, was called a "flying carpet" and gained a reputation for money waste.
- Axial (1980): Responsible for insurance brokerage and administration.
- Engexco Exportadora S.A. (1976 or 1977): Created to gain independence and expand into markets not covered by Petrobras' trading company, until then used to intermediate exports. Exports were then mixed, Engesa and Engexco, until 1981. From that year onwards they went exclusively through the new trading company. It reached 91 employees in 1985–6. It was also used by other Brazilian exporters, mainly military ones. It brokered deals for Casa da Moeda, Embraer, IMBEL, Companhia Brasileira de Cartuchos, Arco-flex and Villares. Third parties even tried to sell poultry in Baghdad, which was not successful. Such contracts did not fit well with large arms sales.

=== Engepeq ===
After the shipment of the first Cascavels to Libya, in 1975, experimental engineering was segregated, with its personnel returning from São José dos Campos to São Paulo (later to Barueri, remaining together with the company's headquarters). There it took advantage of the tax exemption granted to research companies and sought funding from Finep for its research. It handled CAD/CAM used in 1980s projects. There were 220 technical employees and a product engineering division in each IPD.

=== Other ===
Apart from Engesa but with relocated employees, Whitaker Ribeiro created Ensec Engenharia em Sistemas de Segurança in the mid-80s. Designed to provide a security system for the new headquarters of the Casa da Moeda, it also served Vale do Rio Doce and Correios.

In view of Avibras' success with its ASTROS II missile system, Engemíssil was created in April 1986 to operate in this segment. In partnership with the Italian Oto Melara it began the development of the MSS-1.2 anti-tank missile. The ambition continued for a state-owned company to compete with Avibras. Thus, Órbita Sistemas Aerospaciais S.A. was created in January 1987, with a shareholding of 40% from Engesa, 40% from Embraer and 20% divided between IMBEL, Esca (which integrated CINDACTA) and Parcom (civil association of engineers that worked with brigadier Hugo Piva, vice-president of Órbita). In addition to the MSS-1.2, it would take on projects for the Piranha air-to-air missile and the Thunderbolt portable anti-aircraft missile, developed in conjunction with British Aerospace. However, after thirty months "it was nothing more than a modest set of warehouses and workshops", due to the crisis at both Engesa and Embraer. It ended up being extinguished in October 1991.

== Finances ==
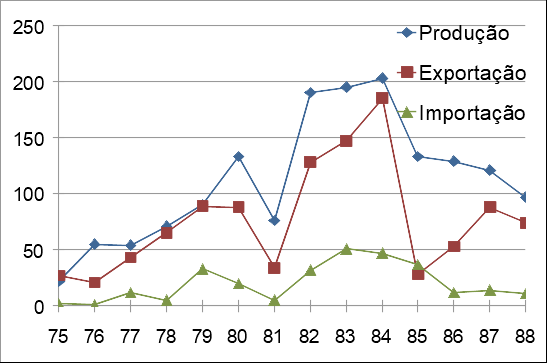
Production, exports and imports in millions of dollars, 1975–1988 (Note: Export values are overestimated, as they are those of Engexco, which negotiated transactions outside the group.)

Engesa's factory in Salvador was acquired with support from SUDENE in 1972 and modernized with financial support from BNDE. The first exports to Libya made it possible to raise financing for the transfer of production to São José dos Campos in 1974. Injections of state financing were important, as in 1975, when BNDE purchased 80 million cruzeiros (22 million dollars in 2006) in shares, a capital contribution of almost 400%. BNDE, in turn, borrowed from the First World, acting as an intermediary.

As France, supplier of the Cascavel's 90mm cannons, began to see Engesa as competition and raised the price to make the product unviable, from 1975 Engesa acquired licenses to produce cannons (for US$3 million) and ammunition, to be produced respectively by Engex and Engequímica. This verticalization meant investing more to sell the same products, but it increased the profit margin and simplified logistics. Exports increased in volume and customers and the BNDE, Brazil's Ministry of Finance and Banco do Brasil were favorable.

In June 1981, employees and suppliers were left without pay. In São José dos Campos, 1,500 workers went on strike, which was resolved two days later with the settlement of their salaries. The company blamed the government: it had not paid off its own debts and suspended IPI credits in November 1979, preferring to promote exports by manipulating the exchange rate. However, the real cause was a 51.7% drop in sales. Libyan orders were almost complete, Iraq was paying slowly, Third World buyers were in debt and BNDE was unwilling to lend money. Bankruptcy was not far away.

As a reaction to the crisis, credit was obtained from Banco do Brasil's Foreign Trade Chamber (CACEX) and the BNDE's shares, equivalent to 12.7% of the share capital and controlled by Mecânica Pesada S.A. — Embramec, were sold to the Odebrecht group, which was interested in operating abroad through Engexco. For Engesa, it was formal independence from public capital. A consortium of European banks also made a loan of US$35 million guaranteed by BNDE. The latter was achieved when in December 1981 Whitaker's allies interceded with BNDE's president: businessman Francisco Catão (Note: See Corrida às leis do DNA, Época, 2010 and Prenderam o banqueiro (em Nova York), Folha de S. Paulo, 1998.) and Morgan banker Keith McDermott. In the following months, Whitaker made successive bank transfers to Catão and hired McDermott as a consultant.

In October 1982, as financial problems and dependence in Iraq continued, Anthony Gebauer, also from Morgan, signed a letter valuing Engesa at $130 million, which, according to an Engesa director, allowed him to convince BNDES (Note: The bank's current name dates from May 1982.) to grant another loan. Whitaker later said the letter "cost me $5 million." Engesa also allegedly had corrupt relations with Chilean dictator Augusto Pinochet through his daughter's UBS account, Rajiv Gandhi, Prime Minister of India from 1984 to 1989, a Bolivian president and Delfim Neto.

The direction of investments, in the previous decade focused on expanding markets and competitive advantages, was in the 1980s the "creation of productive empires" through market domination and diversification into more profitable activities. Diversification was insisted upon by BNDE and would be the response to the painfully perceived seasonality in 1981. It occurred both in the acquisitions of subsidiaries and in products, such as tractors for the civilian market. The technological level reached its peak with Osório, and for three years in a row R&D expenses reached 7% of revenue. US$50–150 million was spent on the tank. Efforts were divided between new technologies, such as the missile sector, apparently profitable, but outside the area of expertise of the technical staff. There was great expansion, with the number of employees in the group rising, according to one source, from 4,000 in 1983 to 10,000 the following year, or according to another, it more than doubled in 1983–1986, exceeding 9,000.

Investments were financed by short-term loans and debt increased, reaching US$400 million in 1988. That year, the pre-bankruptcy financial condition was already reported in the press. The result of the investments was a large amount of fixed capital, and the company began to depend on sales. However, high investment was met with low exports, which would be fatal.

== Bankruptcy ==
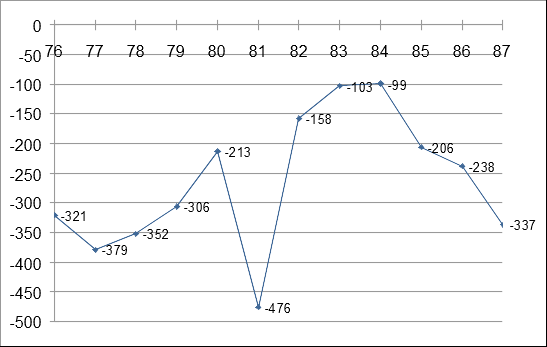
Engesa's position in Exame magazine's "Biggest and Best" ranking, based on revenues

The arms market was different. The volume of international trade began to decline in the mid-1980s and continued into the following decade with the end of the Cold War. The Middle East maintained its imports but only until the end of the Iran-Iraq War in 1988, and its purchasing power was harmed by the fall in oil prices. Iraq developed its own defense industry, reducing imports after 1985. The decline in demand coincided with the growth in supply. Competitors from Cascavel and Urutu invaded their markets. Within Brazil, inflation led to an increase in interest rates and government plans against it lagged the exchange rate in a way that was unfavorable to exports. Avibras and Embraer also went into crisis.

The situation required a downsizing, but senior management took a long time to do so, waiting for the sale of Osório to be completed or for new orders from the government, in which they placed their trust; the high investments were based on the assumption that redemocratization in Brazil would not happen anytime soon and the support of the military would remain firm. However, the sale of Osório failed in 1990 and the new civilian governments were not so interested in being the "stabilizing mechanism", that is, an internal source of demand when it was scarce abroad. However, even some contracts that Engesa managed to negotiate were not fulfilled. In October 1987, Bolivia's Undersecretary of Defense revealed that Engesa's failure to provide spare parts for 700 trucks led to their destruction within three years. In June 1989 the company owed 1,134 trucks to the army, ordered to help it and already paid. A sale of Urutus to Venezuela was not completed due to the inability to produce them. Credibility was damaged.

The factory in São José dos Campos, then with approximately 2,600 employees, laid off 600–800 in July 1988. From 1987 to 1989 the number of employees at the parent company fell from 3,784 to 1,958; working capacity was reduced by half. The downsizing of subsidiaries began this year, late, and there was no more money to establish other production lines. Engetrônica, with 450 employees and US$30 million in debt, was sold in August to Moddata S.A. for US$20 million. In November, the stake in FNV went to the Arab group ASAIC for US$12 million, a third of the real value; 40% had already been sold in 1986.

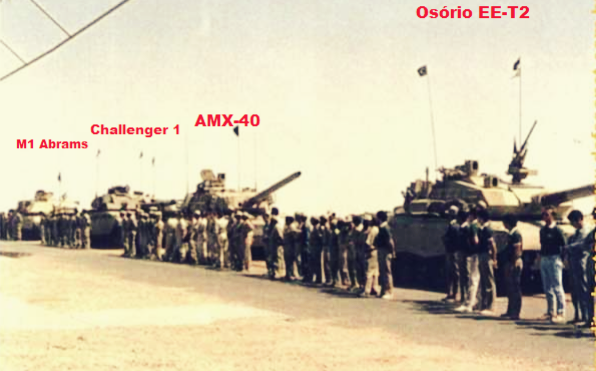
Osório's competition in Saudi Arabia

The company's failures include the inability of ad hoc management to manage growing complexity, the failure to perceive changes in the market and the competition and retaliation it faced, the fragmentation caused by diversification, excessive bureaucracy and neglect of the budget deficit caused by confidence in the army. In the analyses, the decision to develop the Osório is interpreted as a response to the correctly anticipated exhaustion of the Cascavel and Urutu, whose buyers in fact had no need for new acquisitions, or a deviation from the correct focus on the wheeled sector, which attracted more international interest from the 1980s onwards. The company also failed to realize the political nature of the competition it entered, thus losing to the lobby of its American competitor.

At the turn of the 90s, the volume of debts was such that only the large profit from a contract like the sale of Osório would be enough relief. An Iraqi default of 200 million, Osório's commercial failure, the general industry crisis, inefficiency, high costs, mismanagement and lack of government support decided the company's fate. The government was the main creditor, but the possibility of a government bailout was less likely considering the focus on fiscal balance and the waning interest in the arms industry, whose decline was considered acceptable in exchange for immediate economic advantages with the Americans.

Already failing its employees, Engesa filed for bankruptcy on 21 March 1990, after president Fernando Collor took office, failing to pay salaries and exempting employees from attendance. The Iraqi invasion of Kuwait in August and the subsequent American and Saudi participation in the Gulf War interrupted the Osório negotiations. In São José dos Campos, 220 employees operated the workshops in a cooperative to survive. In 1993, a consortium of the Brasilinterpart bank and the Overseas Finance Management Corporation group gave up on buying the company after discovering that it had US$600 million in debt. The judge of the 1st Civilian Court of Barueri declared the group bankrupt on 18 October.

Vehicle carcasses became scrap, the company's library was sold as shredded paper and the workforce was dispersed to other sectors and abroad. In 2000, the building in Barueri was auctioned for R$13 million, while Embraer purchased the plant in São José dos Campos for R$10.4 million. The money was spent on labor debts. In 2019, Engesa remained the 40th largest debtor to the federal government of Brazil.

== Production vehicles ==
- Reconnaissance vehicle: EE-3 Jararaca;
- Armored car: EE-9 Cascavel, It was well used in Iraqi Armed forces during the Iraq-Iran war from 1980 to 1988 and was used heavily in the Gulf War, it is still in service with Iraq, Zimbabwe, and a number of South American armies,
- Armored personnel carrier: EE-11 Urutu, It was well used in Iraqi Armed forces during the Iraq-Iran war from 1980 to 1988 and the subsequent Gulf conflict,
- Trucks: EE-15, EE-25, and EE-50,
- Light Vehicles: EE-4, EE-12 and EE-34,
- Air-portable Armored Vehicle: EE-T4 Ogum,
- Tank destroyers: EE-17 Sucuri I and EE-18 Sucuri II,
- Main battle tank: EE-T1 Osório.
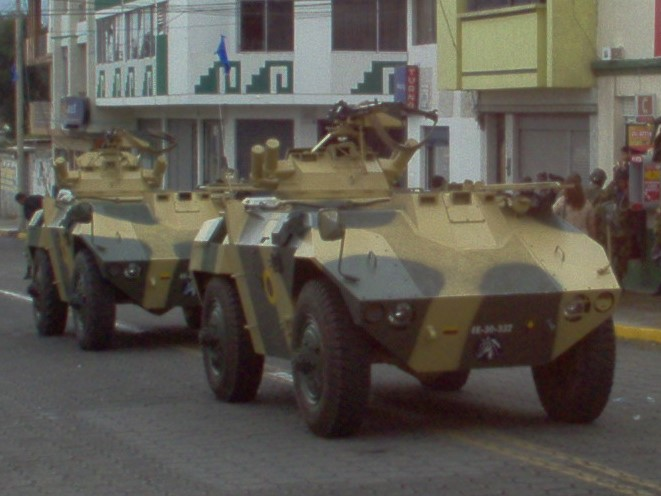
EE-3 Jararaca

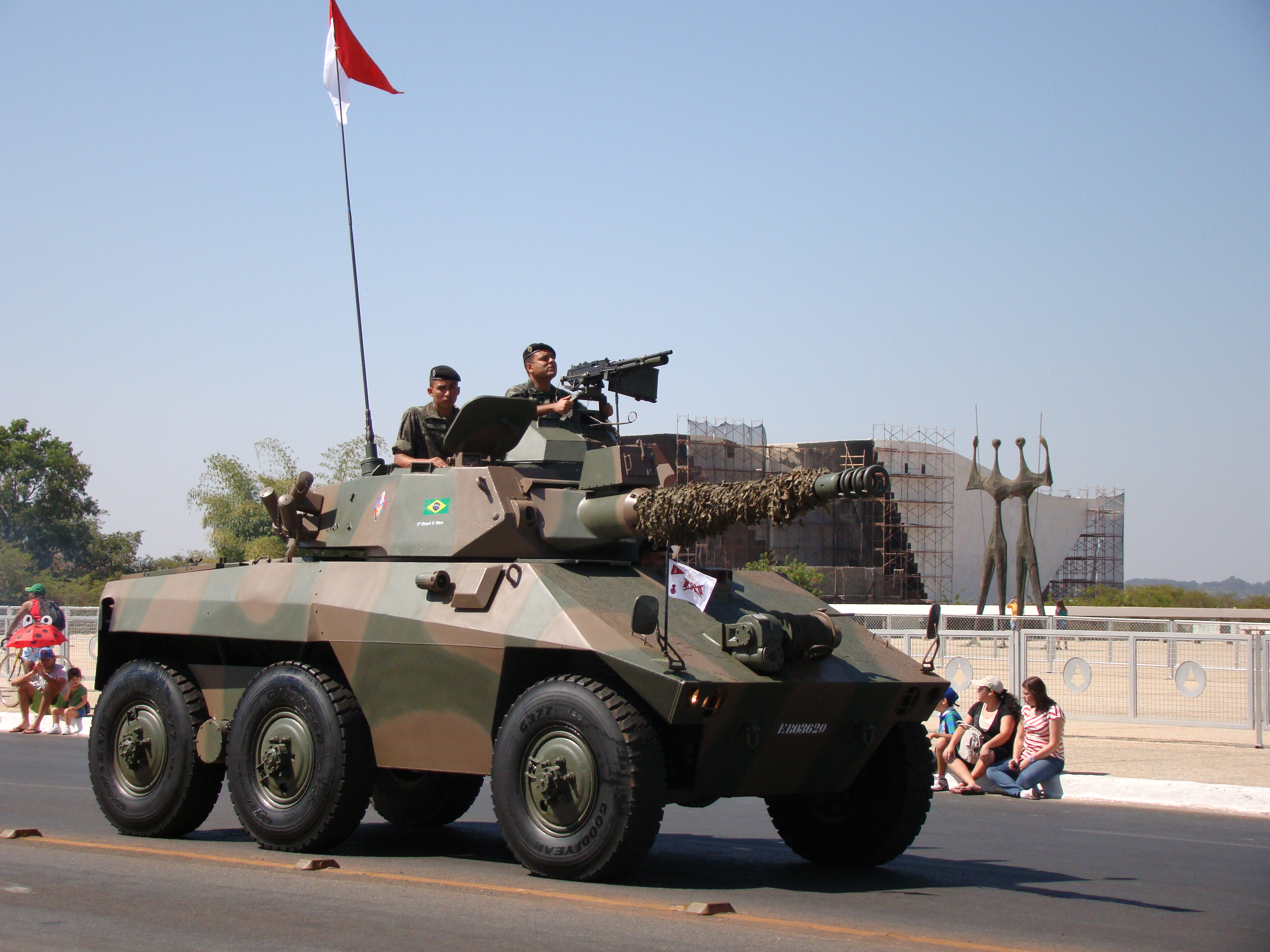
EE-9 Cascavel

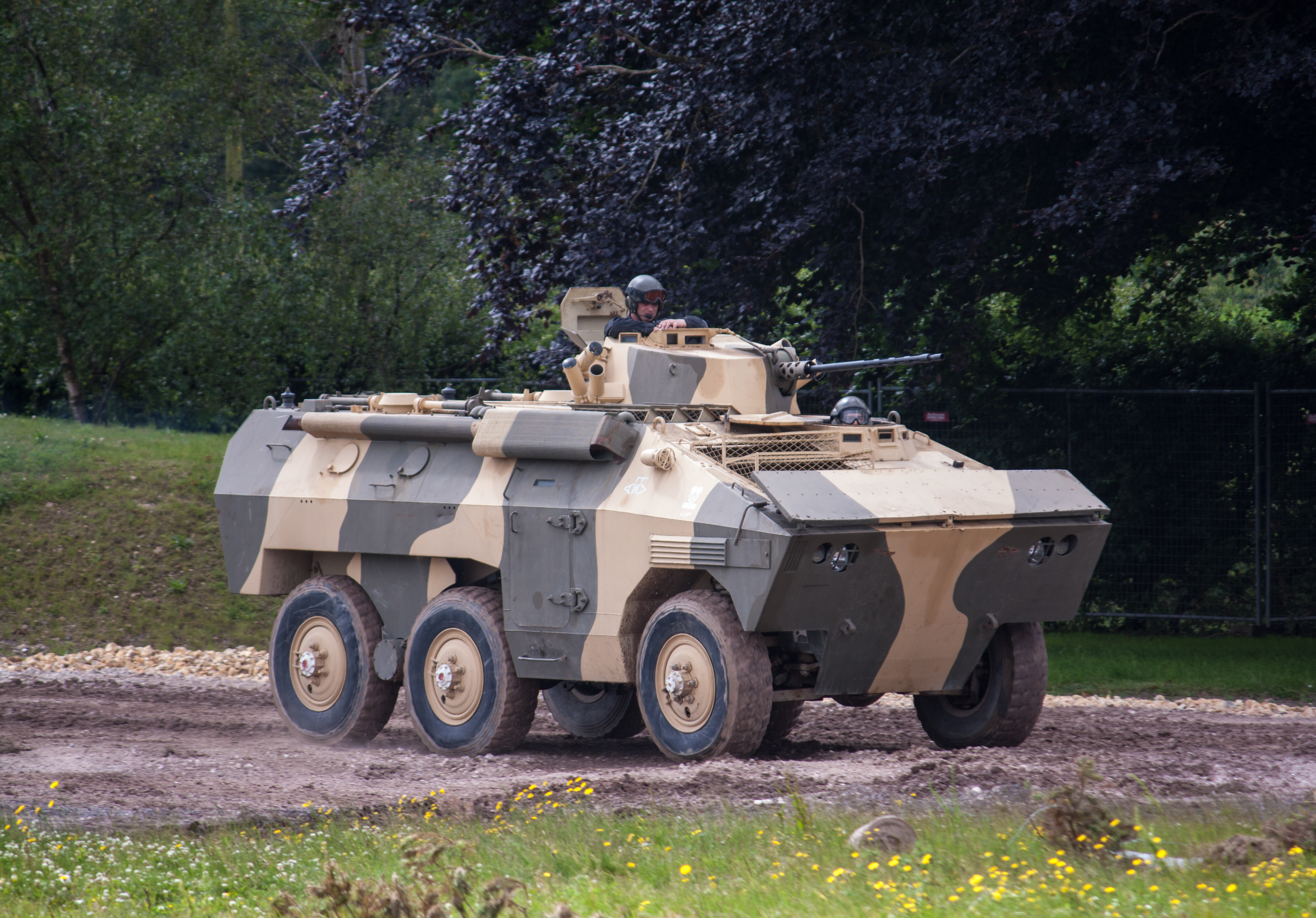
EE-11 Urutu APC

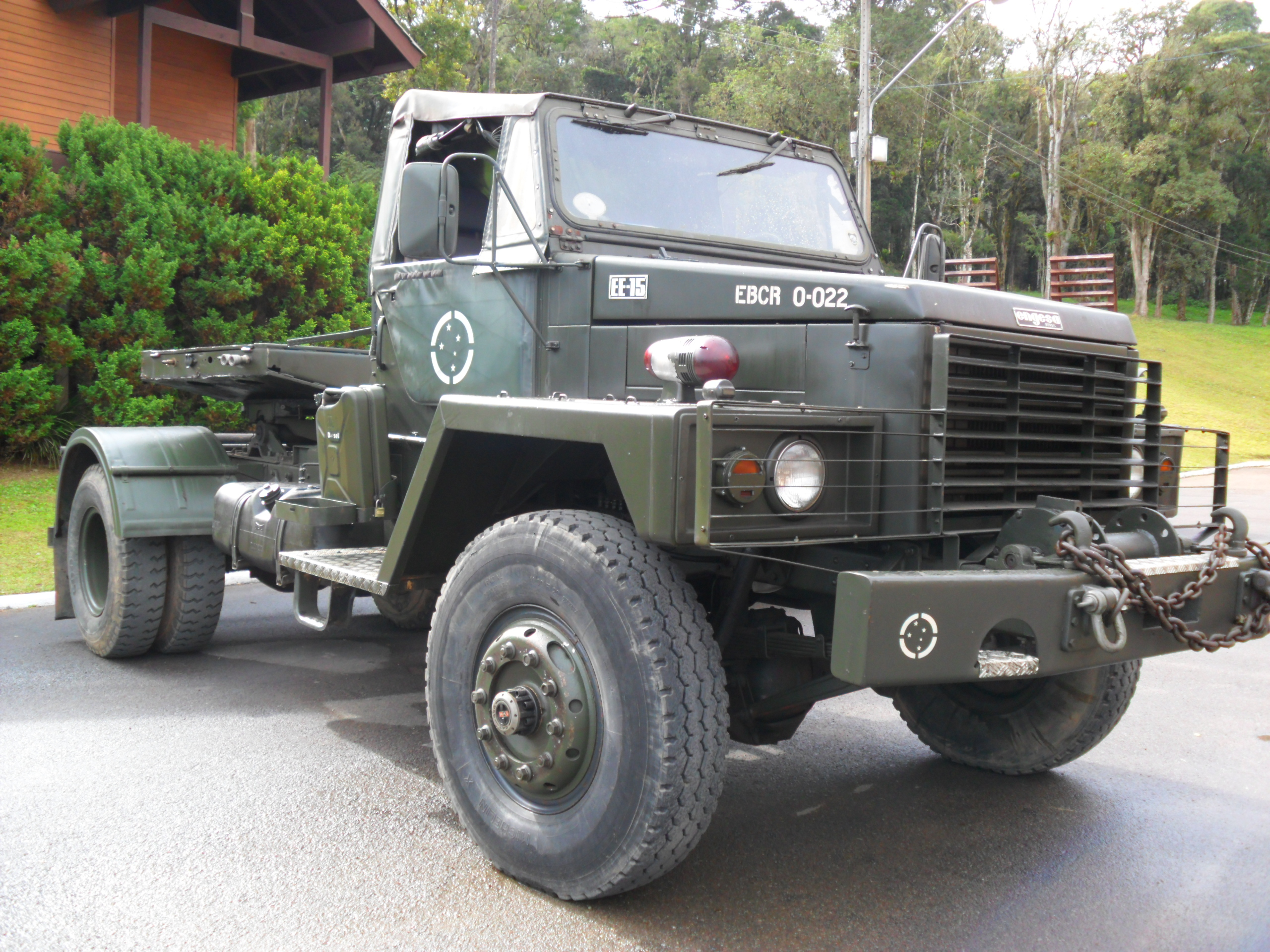
EE-15 heavy truck

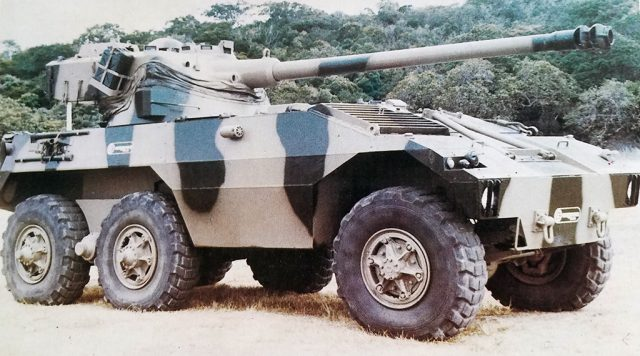
EE-17 Sucuri

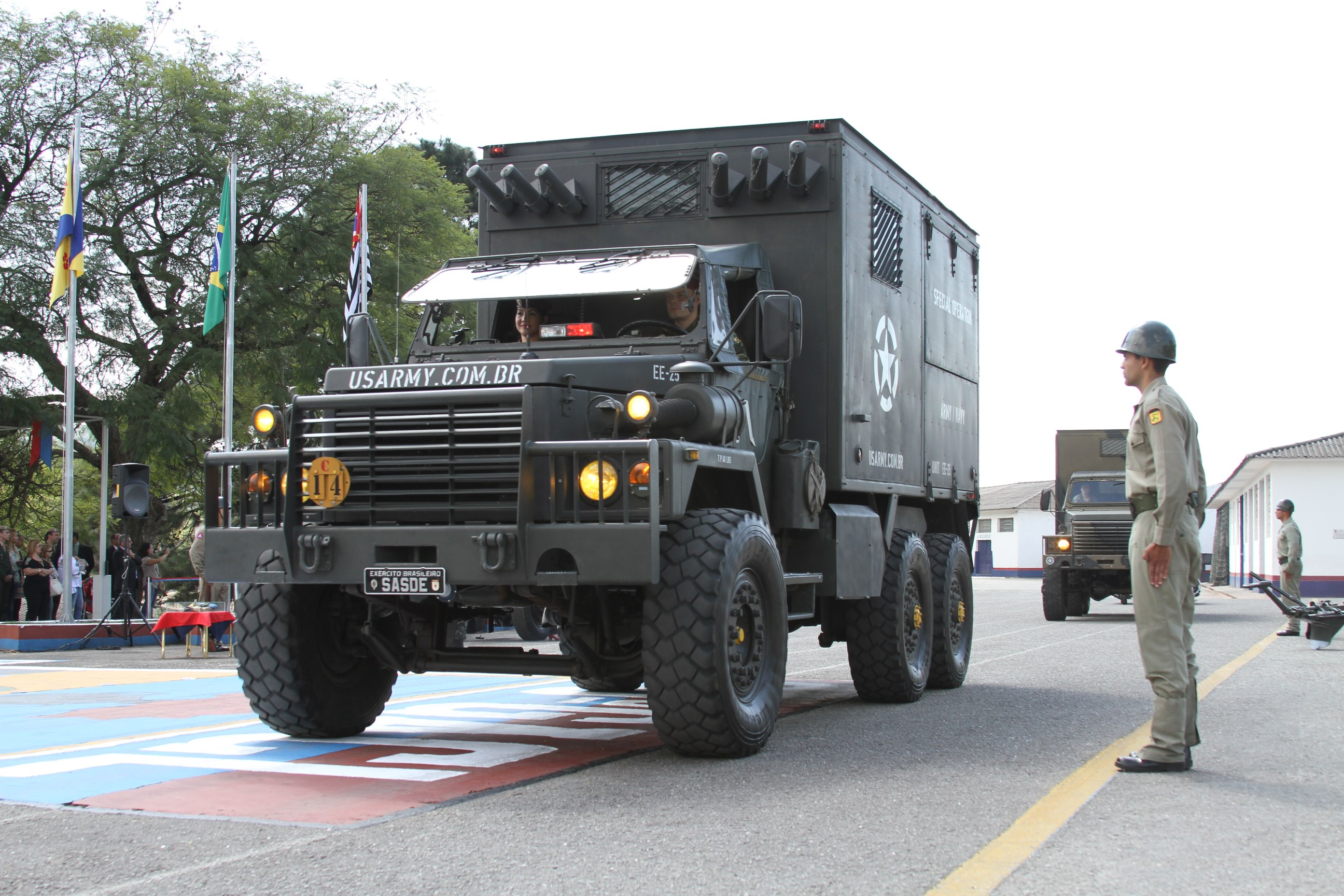
EE-25 Cargo truck with shelter

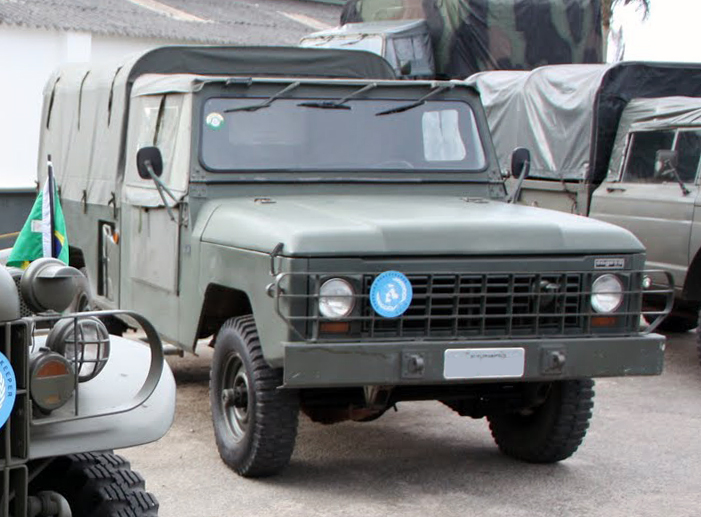
EE-34 pickup

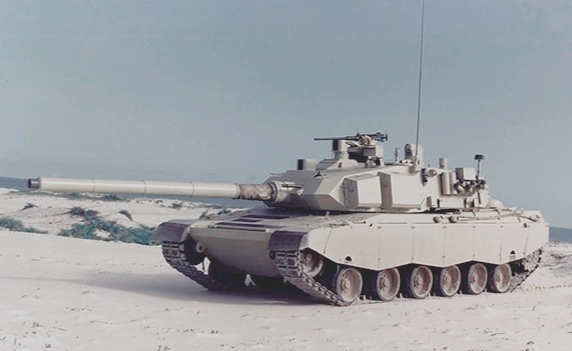
EE-T1 Osório

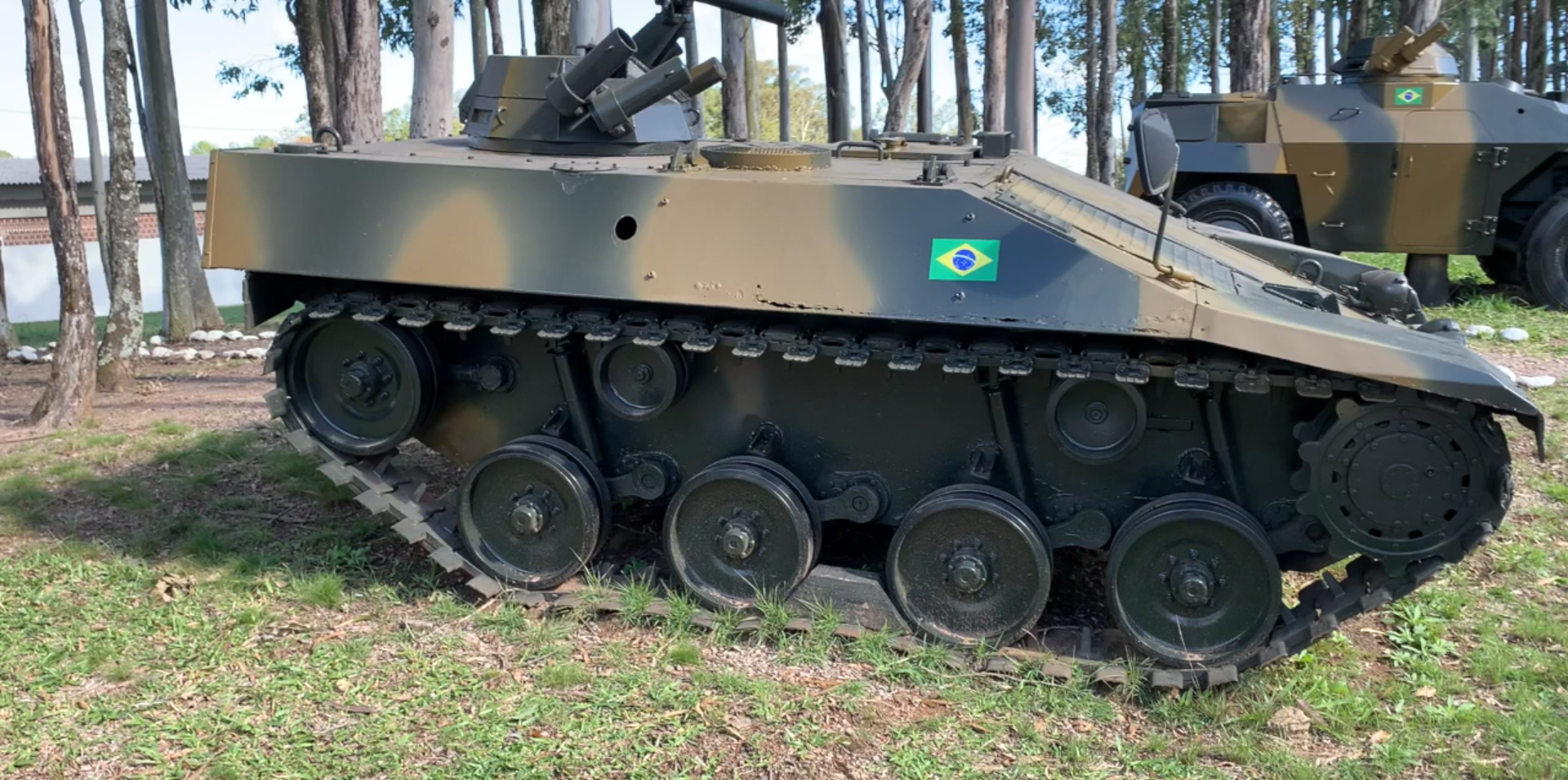
EE-T4 Ogum
