= EE-11 Urutu =

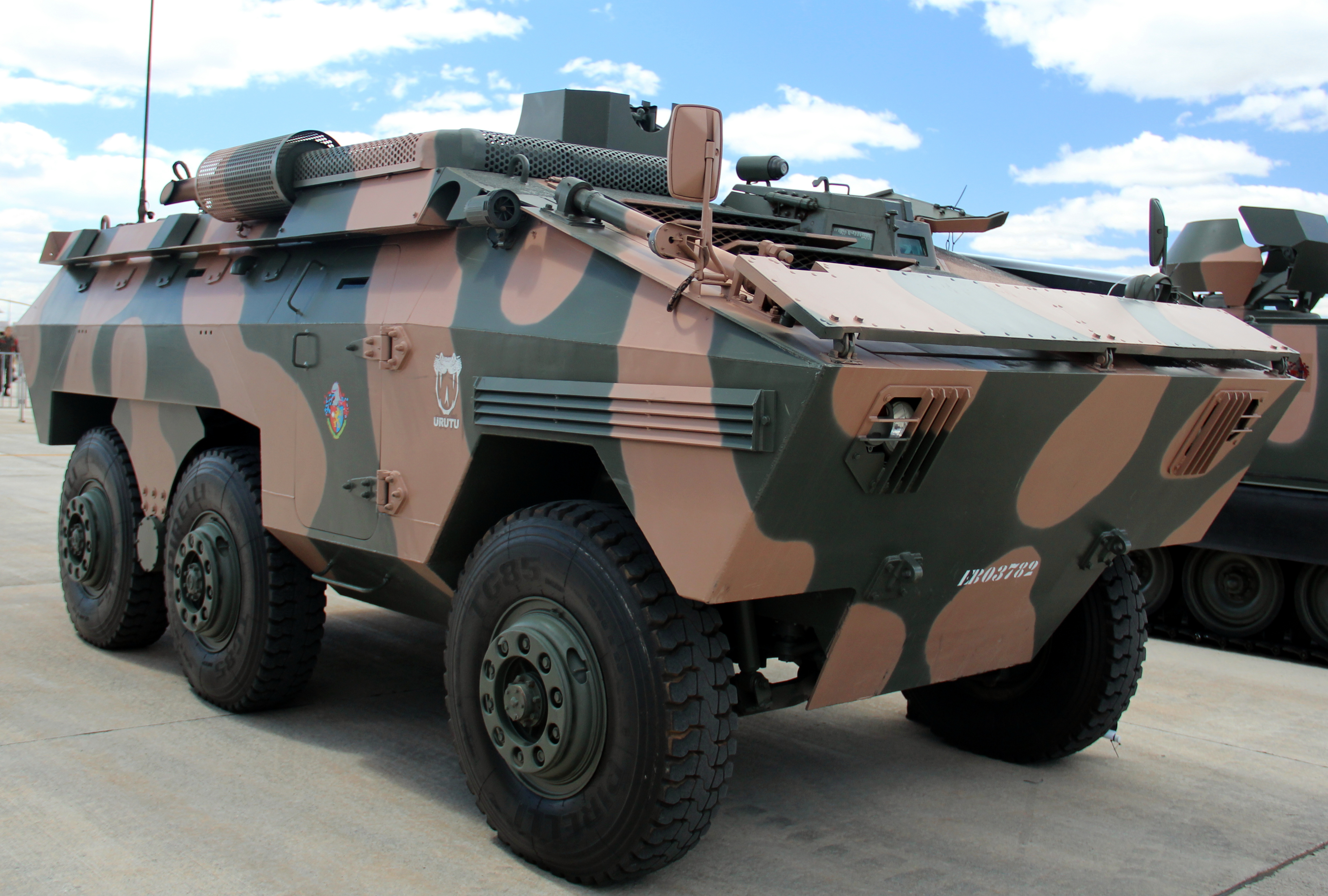
- EE-11 Urutu of the Brazilian Army in 2012
- Type: Amphibious wheeled Armored personnel carrier
- Place of origin: Brazil

Service history
- Used by: See Operators
- Wars: Chadian–Libyan conflict Iran–Iraq War; Gulf War; Colombian conflict Brazilian drug war Libyan Civil War (2011); Iraqi Civil War (2014–2017); 2024 Ecuadorian conflict

Production history
- Designer: José Luiz Whitaker Ribeiro
- Designed: 1970
- Manufacturer: Engesa
- Unit cost: USD $149,100 (new)
- Produced: 1974–1990
- No. built: 1,719
- Variants: See Variants

Specifications
- Mass: 14 tonnes (15 short tons; 14 long tons)
- Length: 6.1 m (20 ft 0 in)
- Width: 2.85 m (9 ft 4 in)
- Height: 2.12 m (6 ft 11 in) (hull)
- Crew: 2 (driver, gunner) + 11 passengers
- Main armament: 12.7mm M2 Browning machine gun (1,000 stowed rounds)
- Engine: Detroit Diesel 6V-53T 6-cylinder water-cooled diesel 212 hp (158 kW)
- Power/weight: 18.6hp /tonne (13.8 kW/tonne)
- Transmission: Allison MT-643 Automatic; 4 forward and 1 reverse gears
- Suspension: Independent suspension with double-action telescopic shock dampers (front); Double axle boomerang with walking beams (rear)
- Ground clearance: 0.38 m (1 ft 3 in)
- Fuel capacity: 380 litres
- Operational range: 850 km
- Maximum speed: 90 km/h (55 mph), 8 km/h (water)

The EE-11 Urutu is a Brazilian amphibious armored personnel carrier. It was based on the drive train and chassis components of the EE-9 Cascavel armored car and initially emerged as part of a project to develop an amphibious troop-carrying counterpart to that vehicle for the Brazilian Army and Marine Corps (CFN). The first pre-production models entered service with the CFN in 1973 and serial production commenced the following year. While the CFN declined to adopt the EE-11 Urutu in large numbers, the Brazilian Army was more forthcoming and purchased 223; these entered service in 1975.

The Urutu was the first fully amphibious armored vehicle developed in Brazil: it can propel itself through water at speeds of 8 km/h via twin propellers. Urutus proved to be extremely popular in the Middle East, particularly with Libya and Iraq, both of which purchased large numbers to complement their fleets of Cascavel armored cars. Iraq deployed its Urutus during the Iran–Iraq War, which became, in effect, a proving ground for the vehicle type. A number of specialized variants were later developed for internal security purposes, vehicle recovery, air defense, cargo transport, and medical evacuation. One hybrid variant was modified to accept the same 90 mm turret-mounted cannon as its Cascavel counterpart; this was marketed unsuccessfully to the United States Army as the Uruvel. Urutus were once operated by over thirty national armies and security forces worldwide.

== Development history ==
During the early 1960s, Brazil's defense industry was negligible and limited largely to producing small arms or refurbishing obsolete US military equipment. Between 1964 and 1967 the Brazilian government launched a program to revitalize the arms industry in response to growing US reluctance to transfer modern defense technology otherwise needed for its own war effort in Vietnam. This provided the impetus for a number of Brazilian engineering firms to begin developing new weapons for domestic purposes, namely Engenheiros Especializados SA (Engesa). In 1967 design work began on a new wheeled armored car to replace the ageing M8 Greyhound then in service with the reconnaissance units of the Brazilian Army. This would evolve into the EE-9 Cascavel, which was based on an upgraded Greyhound with a new engine and suspension features. Engesa president José Luiz Whitaker Ribeiro created the final design plans for the Cascavel and for a parallel project known as the Carro Transporte de Tropas Anfíbio (CTTA), which was to be an amphibious troop-carrying variant mounted on a similar chassis. The first prototype was completed in 1970. In late 1973, the Brazilian Navy accepted the CTTA for preliminary trials with the Marine Corps. The former later declined to purchase the vehicle type in large numbers and only ordered 6. Brazilian Army officials were more forthcoming and ordered 217. Mass production of the CTTA commenced in 1974. The vehicles were assembled in a new, purpose-built factory Engesa had constructed in São José dos Campos. The first CTTAs entered service with the Brazilian Army the following year as the EE-11 Urutu.

The Urutu benefited greatly from the initial export success of the EE-9 Cascavel, with a number of national armies ordering both vehicle types to simplify logistics. Chile purchased 37 in 1975 to complement its preexisting Cascavel fleet; this was followed by similar orders from Libya and Iraq. By the late 1980s, both Libya and Iraq may have purchased hundreds of Urutus each, some of which were re-exported to other states and regional militant movements.

In 1980, the US Army issued a requirement for a new wheeled armored vehicle for a proposed new mobile deployment force, able to bring to bear air-portable firepower in the event of a crisis in the Middle East or Asia. In response, Engesa proposed an Urutu with a large turret ring and the same 90 mm gun as its Cascavel counterpart; this hybrid vehicle was known as the Uruvel. At least one modified Urutu was delivered to the US for trials. If the US Army adopted the Uruvel, a little over half the vehicle's production would be undertaken in the US by the FMC Corporation. In anticipation of a successful bid, FMC even purchased licenses from Engesa to manufacture both the Urutu and the Cascavel, along with their associated parts. The program was shelved during the late 1980s, and the Uruvel was not adopted by any country except Tunisia, which ordered 12.

Engesa experienced a financial crisis in the early 1990s which forced it to suspend all its production lines. By 1993 the firm had declared bankruptcy, and production of the Urutu was formally terminated.

== Service history ==
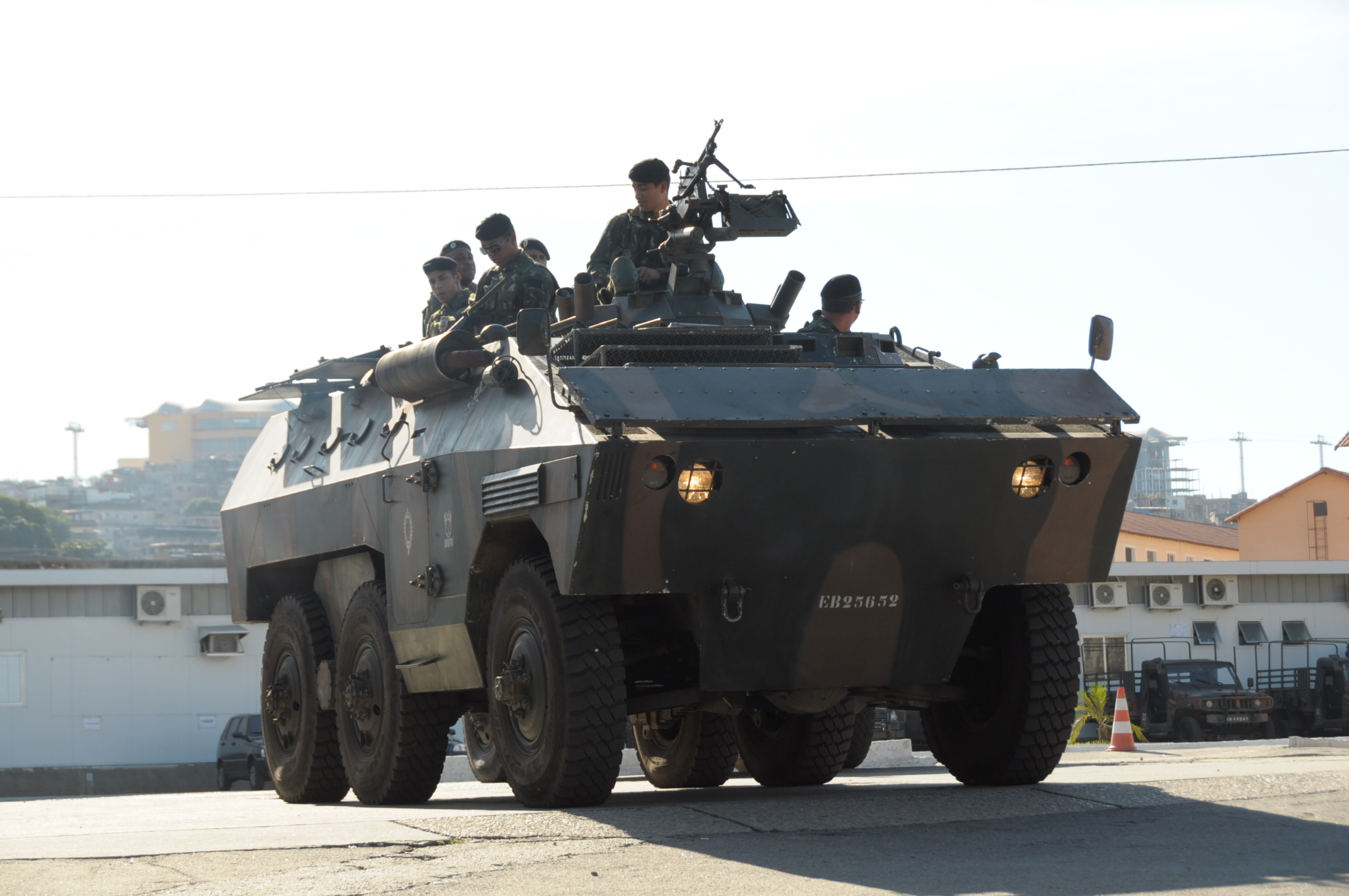
Brazilian infantry squad riding mounted in an EE-11 Urutu, 2012.

Financial considerations and the perceived unreliability of the US as an external supplier of military equipment provided the impetus for the Urutu program's success with the Brazilian Army. Engesa had cultivated a close working relationship with army officials, and personal ties between that firm and the latter were instrumental in securing the initial contract for a new armored personnel carrier. The Urutu was also evaluated favorably because the army wanted lightweight, wheeled vehicles capable of operating over vast distances without the logistics considerations then necessitated by heavier or tracked vehicles. In 1972 the Brazilian Army and the Brazilian Marine Corps formally expressed interest in the Urutu, and by late 1973 the first pre-production vehicles were being trialed. The Urutus tested by the Brazilian Marines were fitted with trim vanes, shrouded propellers, twin rudders, and four air intake tubes to negotiate open sea. Only 6 were ordered. The Brazilian Army accounted for the remainder of Engesa's initial order, purchasing over 200 Urutus. The Urutus were adopted by the support infantry troops in armored cavalry platoons and almost always deployed in concert with Cascavel armored cars. This practice was simplified by the vehicles' shared logistics train and interchangeability in automotive parts. The Urutu remained in front-line service with the Brazilian Army for almost forty years, at which point its basic technology had become quite dated in spite of continuous upgrades; since 2014 it has been superseded by the VBTP-MR Guarani.

Engesa was able to export Urutus widely on three continents. The rugged nature of the vehicles, as well as the fact that they were technologically simple and straightforward to maintain made them attractive purchases for a number of armies in South America, the Middle East, and Africa. Furthermore, Engesa was financially dependent on the prospect of successful exports; despite the large orders for Cascavels and Urutus placed by the Brazilian Army, it would be unable to sustain production otherwise. The domestic market was simply insufficient to support an armored vehicle industry, so export orders were perceived as helping achieve the economy of scale needed to make Engesa's operations viable. In 1973, Engesa unsuccessfully bid for a contract to develop a new wheeled infantry fighting vehicle for the South African Army. South Africa was the first foreign power to show an explicit interest in the Urutu and even tested a model optimized for southern African conditions as the Vlakvark. Engesa lost the bid to a German firm which produced a prototype of what would later become the Ratel. Its next attempt to market the Urutu on the international market took place in Chile and was more successful. Due to the political isolation of the Chilean military regime, Engesa found it had little competition in selling armored vehicles to that country's armed forces. Chile obligingly placed an order for 37 Urutus in 1975. The importance with which Engesa regarded this order was highlighted by its prioritization of the Chilean purchase in production, with domestic orders to the Brazilian Army being temporarily sidelined. In 1976, more Cascavels and Urutus were delivered to Chile than were in service with the entire Brazilian armed forces at the time. Chile retired its Urutus in 2002 and sold off its entire fleet to an Israeli defense contractor for re-export.

Engesa's largest success in the export market came in the 1970s from Libya, which ordered 200 Cascavels as part of an arms deal worth $100 million. The Cascavel's combat debut in the 1977 Libyan–Egyptian War aroused international interest in Engesa armored vehicles, especially in the Middle East, and a number of Arab states such as Iraq dispatched military missions to Brazil that year to evaluate them. The Iraqi Army subsequently placed an order for 100 Urutus. Libya ordered more Cascavels and 180 Urutus in 1981. In time, these two nations became the largest single operators of the vehicle type, each holding hundreds of Urutus in service.

Libya deployed its Urutus extensively during the Chadian–Libyan conflict, most often during mechanized operations in support of National Liberation Front of Chad (FROLINAT) rebels. To downplay the extent of overt Libyan involvement, the Urutus were typically stationed near FROLINAT posts and presented to the press as FROLINAT vehicles. Prior to the 2011 Libyan Civil War, the Libyan Army had 100 Urutus remaining in service, although it is unclear how many were in reserve storage or operational. Some were apparently restored to service by Libyan militias during the civil war and retrofitted with BM-11 multiple rocket launchers.

The Urutu was deployed by both sides during the Iran–Iraq War. Most of the Iraqi Urutus were assigned to individual brigades of the Republican Guard during that conflict. It is unclear where Iran obtained its Urutu fleet; while most would appear to have been captured from Iraq, French historian Pierre Razoux asserted that at least some of the Iranian Urutus were acquired directly through Brazil. Another possibility is that the Urutus were transferred to Iran by a third party. No restrictive conditions were placed on the re-sale or transfer of Engesa products purchased by Libya, allowing that country to re-export Cascavels and Urutus as it saw fit. Libya reportedly exported 130 unidentified armored vehicles of Brazilian origin to Iran before 1987.

== Description ==
The basic layout of all Urutu variants is the same: the driving compartment is located to the front left of the hull, with the engine compartment to the front right and the troop compartment to the immediate rear. The driver is provided with a hatch and three driving periscopes in the sharply angled vehicle glacis. Passengers may debark from doors on either side of the hull or from the rear; they are also afforded four emergency hatches in the hull roof. The troop compartment is fitted with vision blocks and firing ports as standard to allow passengers situational awareness while embarked. An Urutu's hull is composed of two distinct layers of welded ballistic steel able to resist point-blank small arms fire, including 7.62×39mm armor-piercing ammunition.

The Urutu was fitted with a 12.7mm Browning M2 heavy machine gun as standard. The machine gun is operated by a gunner seated directly behind the driver in the left of the hull. In all late production models, the gunner's station is also provided with day/night sights with five power magnification and a stadiametric rangefinder. Some of the more common Urutu variants replaced the Browning heavy machine gun with a single turret or pintle-mounted 7.62mm general-purpose machine gun. Depending on the size of the turret ring, it was also possible to fit heavier turrets carrying gun-mortars or low-pressure cannon for direct fire support.

Transmission consists of an Allison MT-643 automatic gearbox with five forward and one reverse gear ratios. Early Brazilian Army Urutus used either a Clark manually operated gearbox with the same gear pattern or a manual Mercedes-Benz 63/40 gearbox. The Urutu has an independent double wishbone suspension for its front wheels, but the rear two axles are fitted with a unique boomerang type walking beam suspension with semi-elliptical springs.

=== External ===
Urutus had a very distinct hull with a sharply angled glacis; the front of the hull slopes back to just forward of the rear wheels at 60°. The hull sides are vertical until halfway to the roof line, at which point they slope slightly inwards. Hull doors are visible to the rear of the first wheel station on either side of the vehicle, although the final production run of Urutus produced by Engesa eliminated the door on the right to create a more spacious engine compartment.

== Variants ==
=== Production marks ===
- Urutu Mk I: First production model to enter service with the Brazilian Army in 1975. Powered by a 174 hp (130 kW) Mercedes-Benz engine with a manual Clark transmission. This variant also lacked propellers; water propulsion was accomplished by use of the wheels.
- Urutu Mk II: Second production model, which replaced the Clark gearbox with a Mercedes-Benz 63/40 gearbox but was otherwise identical to the first mark.
- Urutu Mk III: Third and by far most common production model, which incorporated an Allison MT-643 automatic gearbox and a Detroit Diesel 6V-53T 6-cylinder water-cooled diesel engine.
- Urutu Mk IV: The final production model introduced by Engesa, which offered the option of a 190 hp (142 kW) Mercedes-Benz OM 352 engine and an Allison AT-540 automatic gearbox. Other possible options included various Mercedes engine and Allison gearbox combinations.

=== Other variants ===
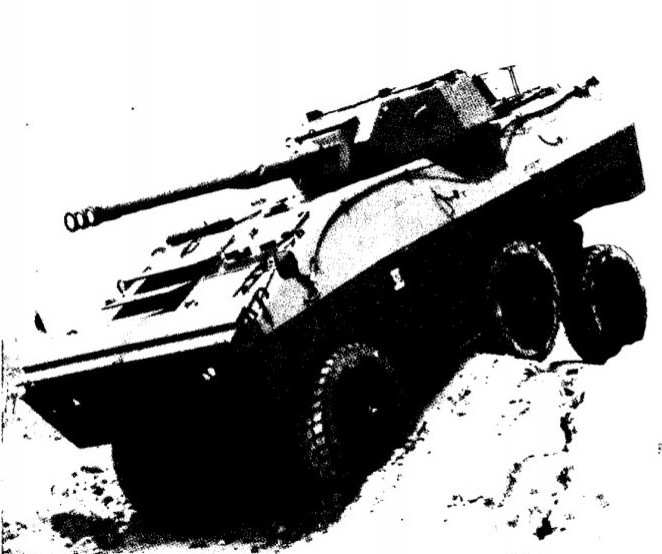
Uruvel with 90 mm gun undergoing trials.

Engesa produced a wide variety of variants which grafted modifications on its basic production models; of these the Uruvel is the most well-known, but the others went largely unnamed and were often designated according to their intended role.

- Uruvel: Also known as the Urutu Armored Fire Support Vehicle, the Uruvel was developed for a US Army program during the 1980s aimed at creating a multi-purpose, air-portable wheeled armored vehicle capable of delivering direct fire support as needed. It was a baseline Urutu modified with a large turret ring to accommodate the Cockerill Mk.III 90 mm cannon and EC-90 turret of the EE-9 Cascavel. The Uruvel was first publicly unveiled in 1985; it could seat four infantrymen in addition to a driver and two-man turret crew.
- EE-11 Mortar Carrier: Urutu modified with an 81 mm mortar in the troop compartment; the mortar is fired through a hatch in the hull roof. The mortar could be elevated from +40° to +80° and was designed for quick disassembly as needed. A 7.62mm general-purpose machine gun is mounted on the hull roof for self-defense.
- EE-11 Ambulance: Urutu equipped with four stretchers, a freezer, and medical equipment, as well as a raised roofline, with the troop compartment redesigned for casualty transport.
- EE-11 Riot Control: Turretless Urutu equipped with a bulldozer blade for clearing street barricades.
- EE-11 Recovery: Urutu modified with a hydraulic crane and towing winch, portable generator, and increased internal stowage for accommodating power tools and welding equipment.
- EE-11 Anti-Tank: Urutu fitted with a one-man turret housing a 25 mm autocannon capable of firing 600 rounds per minute and a bank for TOW anti-tank guided missiles. This variant was developed for the United Arab Emirates; it could also be fitted with MILAN anti-tank guided missiles as needed.
- EE-11 Cargo Transporter: Urutu designed as a general transporter for hauling or towing heavy loads. This variant had an internal load capacity of up to 2,000 kg.
- EE-11 Command and Control: Urutu modified to carry additional radio equipment.
- EE-11 Air Defense: Urutu carrying twin 20 mm autocannon in a French-designed Electronique Serge Dassault TA20/RA20 turret.
- 60mm mortar: A version that carries a 60 mm mortar, firing HE, HEAT and other munitions. The direct fire range is 300 m and indirect fire range is 2,600 m. An option is available for a 7.62 mm machine gun with 1,200 rounds, or a 12.7 mm machine gun with 600 rounds.

There were also Urutu prototypes modified to carry turrets armed with twin general-purpose machine guns, twin heavy machine guns, a single HS804 20 mm autocannon.

=== Colombian derivatives ===
During the early 1990s, Colombia began seeking a domestically produced replacement for its Urutu fleet. The decision to acquire a uniquely Colombian armored personnel carrier was made because it saved hard currency and promoted local industry; with Engesa's closure, Colombian officials were also concerned that parts for the Urutu series would become increasingly scarce and expensive to source in the future. In 1993, Colombia produced a single prototype designated El Zipo, which was essentially a simplified Urutu rebuilt with local parts and a reverse engineered hull. Between 1996 and 2003 three more prototypes were built and designated Aymara. The program was shelved after the Colombian Army rejected the Aymara in favor of the Dragoon 300 to complement the Urutus remaining in service. At least one prototype was retained for training purposes, while another may have been converted into an explosive ordnance disposal vehicle.

The Colombian Urutu derivatives shared the same transmission, electrical system, and engine of the baseline Urutu but utilized a four-wheeled chassis which eliminated the vehicle's articulated boomerang suspension. Their hulls were externally identical to that of the Urutu, retaining the same hatch and door configuration; however, the interior dimensions were different. For example, the engine compartment of the Aymara was located in the center of the hull rather than at the front and to the right like the Urutu. The prototypes were all at least five tonnes heavier than the standard Urutu and lacked amphibious capability.

== Operators ==
=== Current operators ===
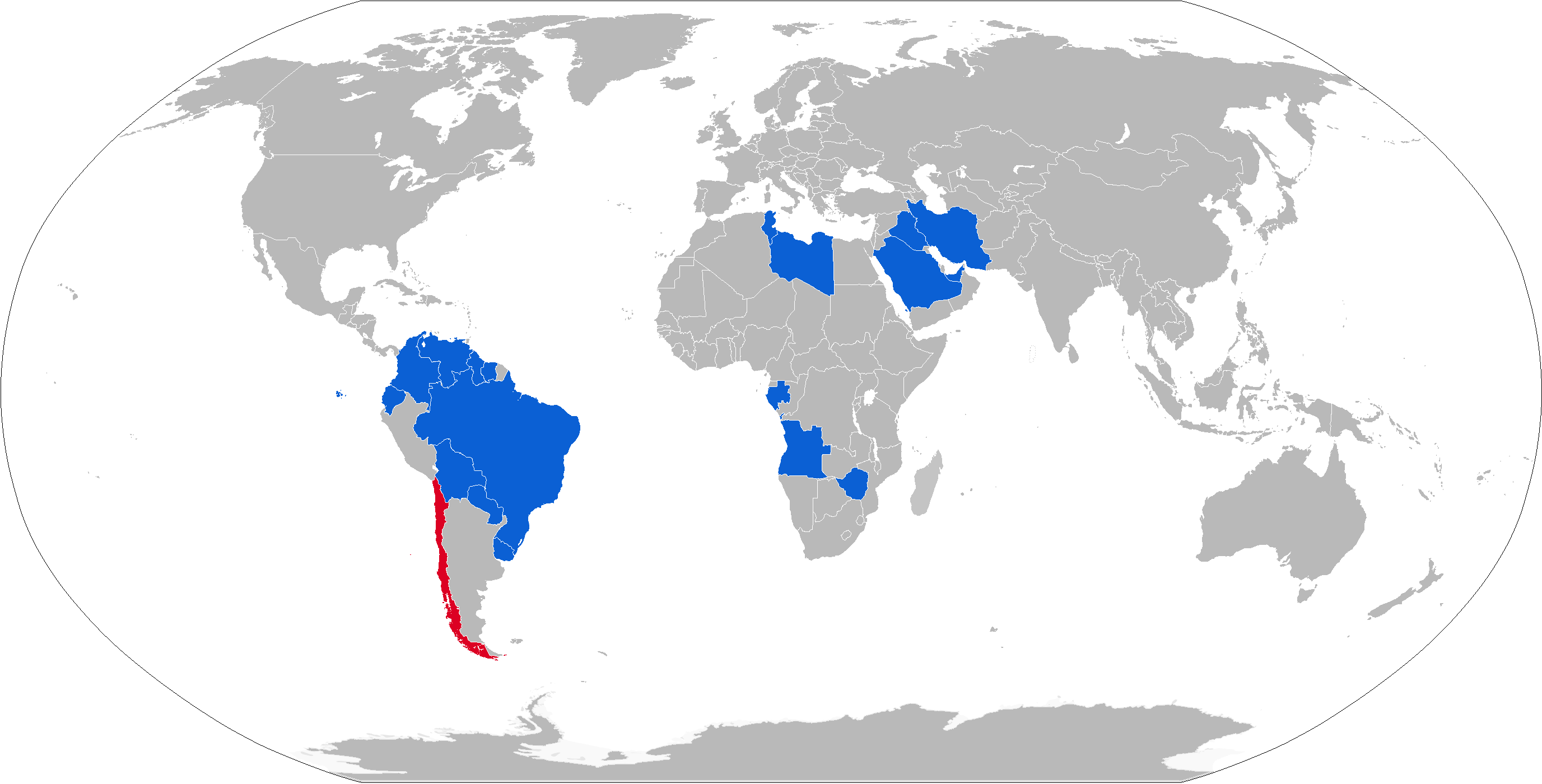
Map of EE-11 operators in blue with former operators in red

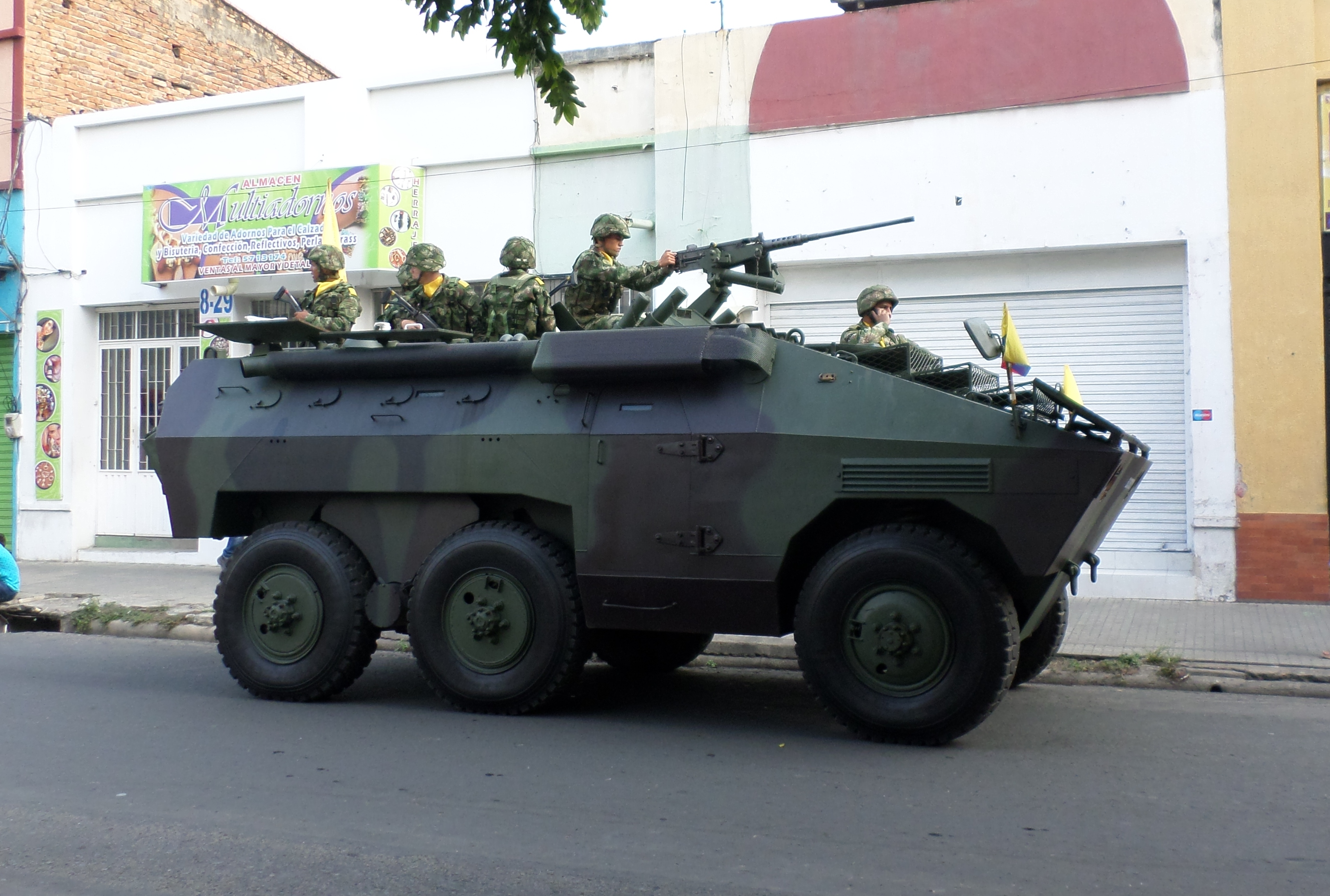
EE-11 Urutu in service with the Colombian Army in 2016.

- Angola: 24
- Bolivia: 12
- Brazil: 5 M2, 50 M6 variants in service as ambulance/engineering vehicles; in process of replacement by VBTP-MR Guarani.
- Colombia: 56
- Cyprus: 10
- Dubai: 60
- Ecuador: 32
- Gabon: 12
- Guyana 24
- Iraq: 148
  - Kurdistan Region
- Iran
- Jordan: 82
- Libya
- Nigeria
- Paraguay: 12
- Senegal
- Suriname: 15
- Tunisia: 18
- Uruguay: 29
- Venezuela: 38
- Zimbabwe: 7

=== Former operators ===
- Chile: 37
