= Defense industry of Brazil =

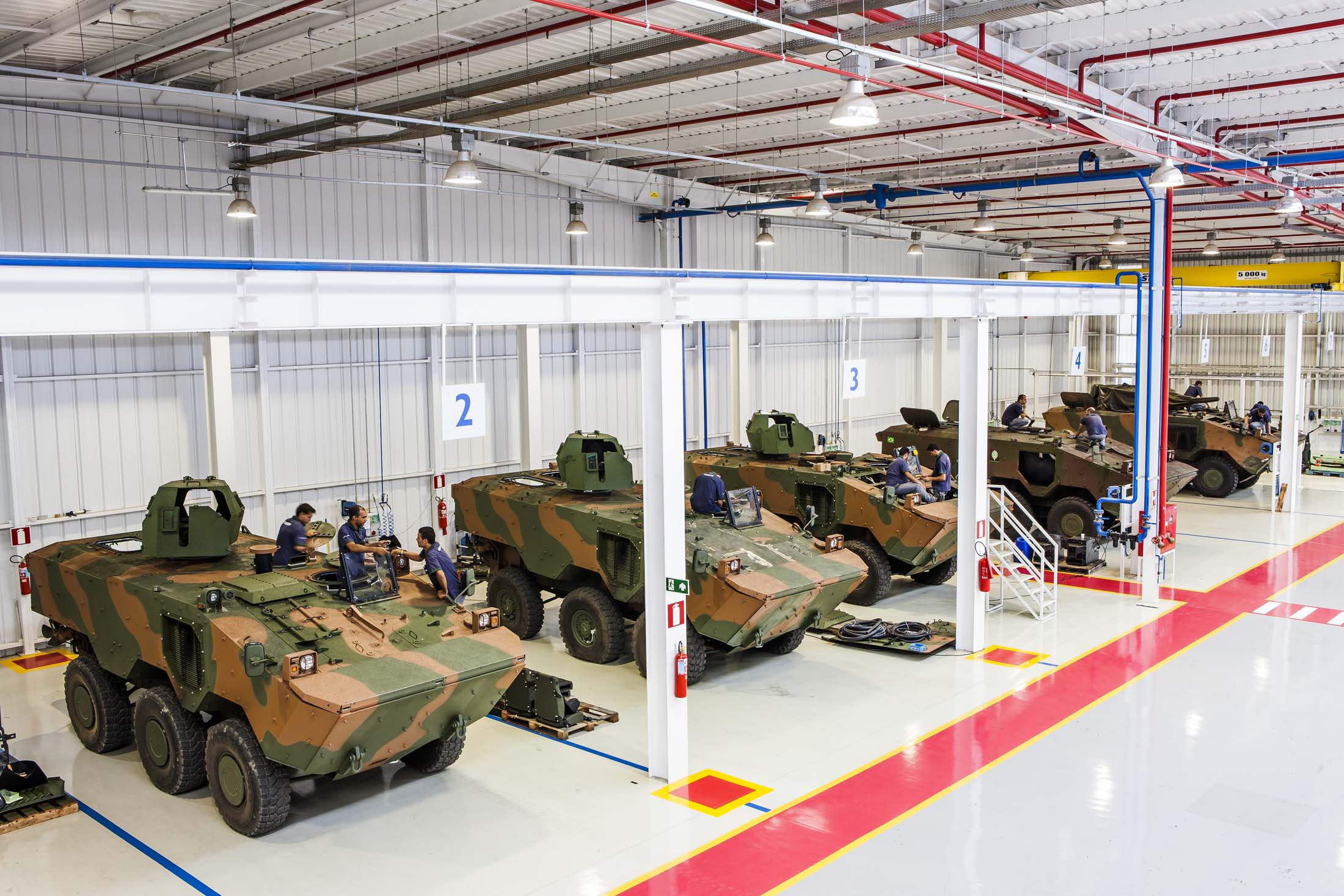
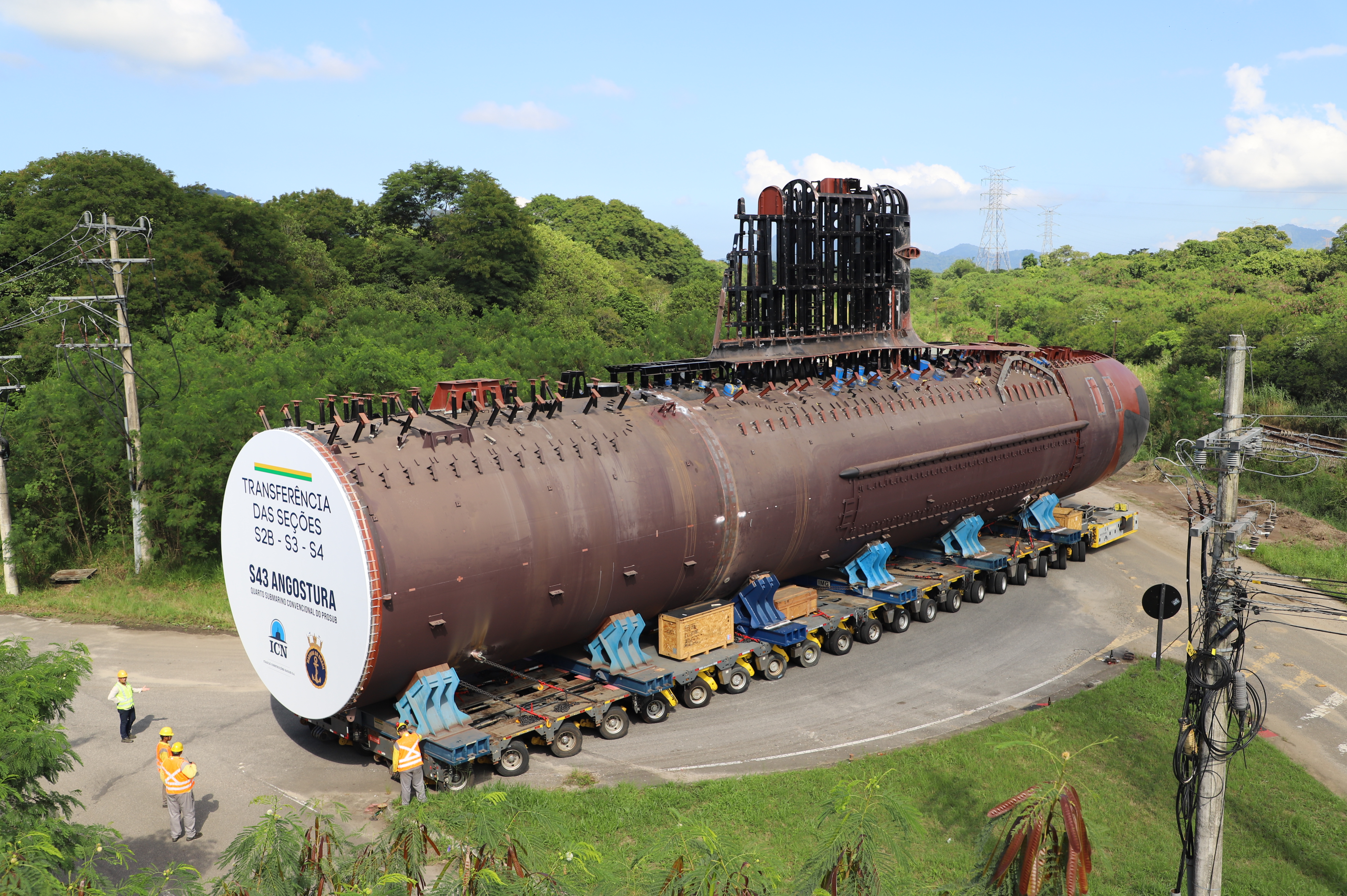
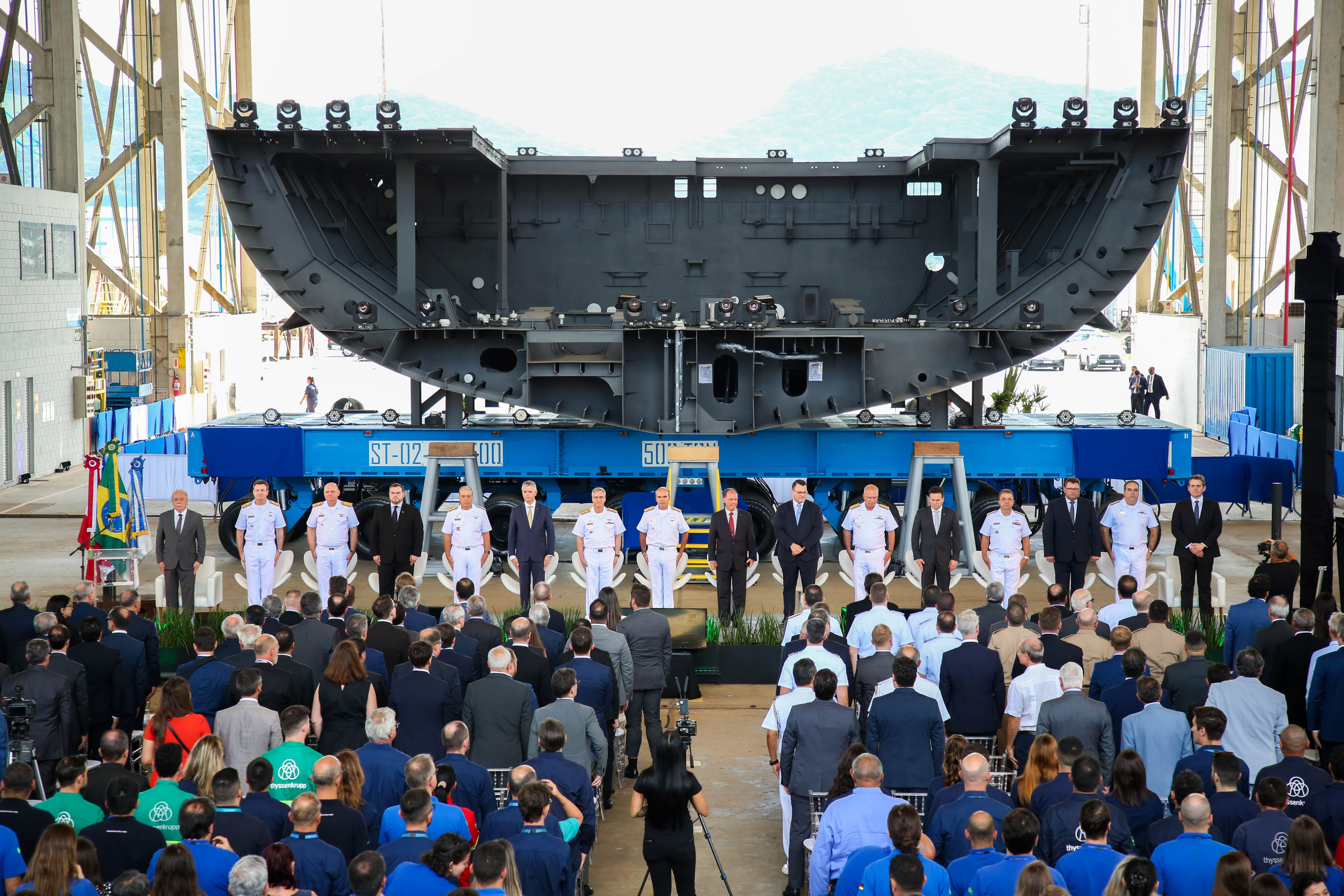
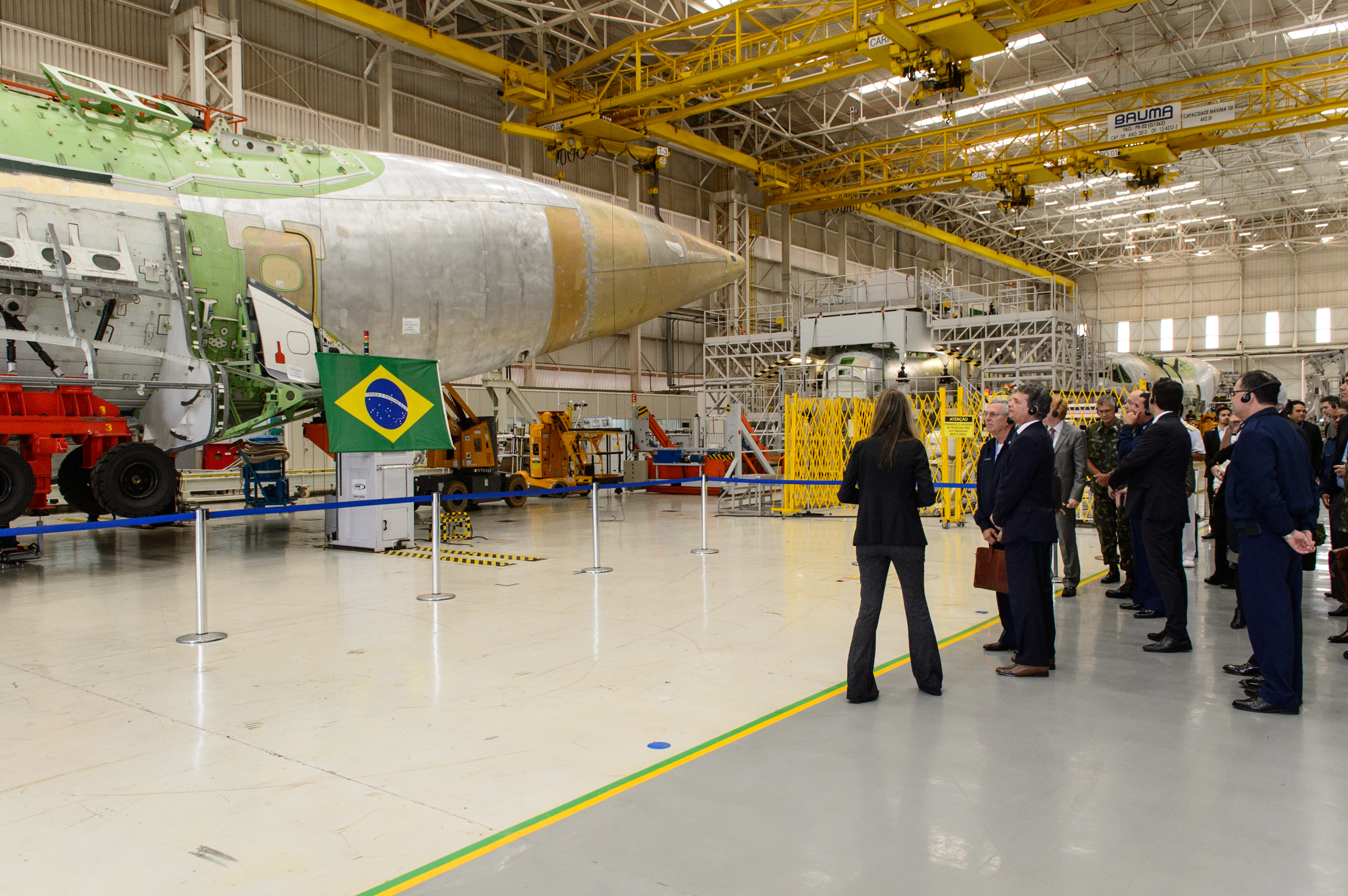
- Top left: Guarani armored vehicle production line
- Top right: Construction of the submarine Almirante Karam
- Bottom left: Keel-laying of the frigate Tamandaré
- Bottom right: Embraer C-390 in production

The Brazilian defense industry boasts a diverse range of manufacturers producing various military equipment, firearms, ammunition, missiles, aircraft, armored vehicles, and explosives. It generates an annual revenue of approximately R$1 billion and employs around 40,000 people, according to data from Aniam (Brazil's National Association of the Arms and Ammunition Industry).

From 1975 to 1985, Brazil became one of the few countries to simultaneously produce aircraft, artillery, armored vehicles, navigation and radar systems, and warships. At its peak, it was the world's tenth-largest arms exporter. The industry faced a crisis in the late 1980s and early 1990s, but some companies survived and continued their development into the 21st century.

Currently, Brazil’s largest military exporter is Embraer, which annually exports its Super Tucano aircraft in military and training versions, the ERJ series with military modifications, and its C-390 cargo planes. Other key players include Helibras (the Brazilian manufacturer of Airbus Helicopters), Avibras (a producer of missiles, rockets, and launch systems), and manufacturers of light firearms, particularly pistols and revolvers made by Taurus, shotguns by Boito, and assault rifles by the state-owned IMBEL. These weapons are exported for military, civilian, and law enforcement markets worldwide. Since 2007, Brazil has hosted LAAD, the leading defense, armament, and military equipment trade fair in Latin America, attracting visitors, buyers, and exhibitors from all continents.

== History ==
=== Early years ===
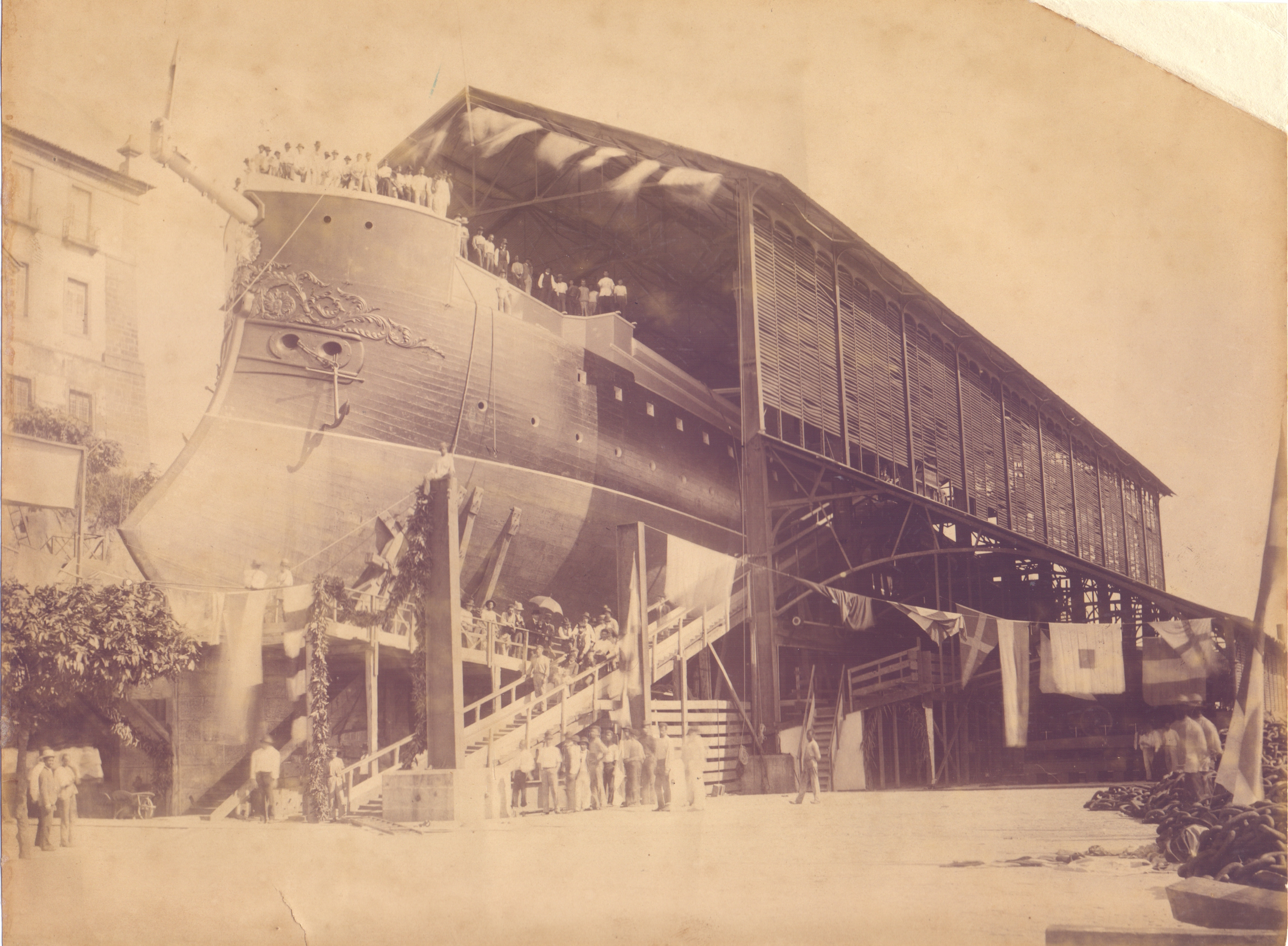
Construction of the warship Tamandaré (1890)

There are reports that in 1762, the Casa do Trem was established in Rio de Janeiro with the purpose of repairing and maintaining weapons and equipment for existing troops at the time. This date coincides with the creation of the Rio de Janeiro War Arsenal.

Officially, the defense industry in Brazil emerged in 1808 with the establishment of the Fábrica de Pólvora da Lagoa Rodrigo de Freitas (Gunpowder Factory of Lagoa Rodrigo de Freitas) in Rio de Janeiro by King John VI. Since it was government-owned, the gunpowder factory was part of the Ministry of the Army for many years until it was finally incorporated into the newly created IMBEL in 1975.

Before this, all weaponry in Brazil was imported from Europe . Muskets, pistols, blunderbusses, lead shot, gunpowder, and cannons were brought in the holds of ships for hunting, colonial defense, expeditions by the bandeirantes, and controlling Indigenous peoples and enslaved people at the time. Many weapons from this period can still be found in various museums across Brazil.

The colonial navy had several arsenals, especially the one in Rio de Janeiro, which was established in 1763. Its first warship was built four years later. During John VI's reign, shipbuilding was concentrated in Bahia due to its abundant timber. From 1810 to 1822, only seven warships were built. In 1827, the arsenals constructed one nau, three frigates, one corvette, and eight gunboats. However, they did not constitute an industrial naval complex and struggled to keep up with technological advancements. The transition from sail to steam engines and from wood to iron required industrial, rather than artisanal, shipbuilding. During the Paraguayan War, Brazil designed ironclads in record time, but after the costly construction of the Tamandaré battleship in 1890 and the bombardment and relocation of Rio de Janeiro arsenal’s equipment during the Naval Revolt of 1893, imports became the primary means of expanding the fleet.

Throughout the 19th century, there was gunpowder production, cannon foundry operations, and shipbuilding, all under state control and located near the centers of power. In some strategic regions, the private production of light weapons and ammunition was encouraged. At the beginning of the Brazilian Republic, the Brazilian Army operated a Cartridge and War Artifacts Factory in Rio de Janeiro, two Gunpowder Factories (in Rio de Janeiro and Mato Grosso), three War Arsenals (in Rio de Janeiro, Rio Grande do Sul, and Mato Grosso), and several specialized laboratories, including pyrotechnics (in Rio Grande do Sul), bacteriology, chemistry, and pharmaceuticals (in Rio de Janeiro).

=== Development (until the 1960s) ===
Construction of the Companhia Siderúrgica Nacional (1941)

In the 1930s, five more army factories were established. During Getúlio Vargas' government, centralization, industrialization, and the alignment of political and industrial elites paved the way for the cause of military autonomy. Private capital showed little interest in the sector, and state production was limited to small-caliber weapons and explosives. However, during this period, the necessary industrial base began to emerge to add value to military items, most notably with the creation of Companhia Siderúrgica Nacional in 1941. The import substitution policies of subsequent governments also played a significant role. Despite these advancements, external dependence for military equipment remained considerable, particularly with the Brazil-United States Military Agreement. From 1946 to 1970, American weaponry dominated, enabling the formation of both an armored and an airborne division. However, the unrestricted entry of foreign armaments hindered national defense projects.

Until 1960, almost all military production took place at the Galeão Base and in the factories and arsenals of the army and navy. Meanwhile, the overall industrial sector was expanding, so when the military sector diversified, it already had suppliers and skilled labor available, supported by established metallurgical and automotive industries. This development set Brazil apart from Argentina’s defense industry, which had emerged earlier and was used to drive the growth of the civilian industry. In Brazil, however, the military industry primarily contributed to the sophistication of already well-integrated industrial sectors.

==== For the navy ====
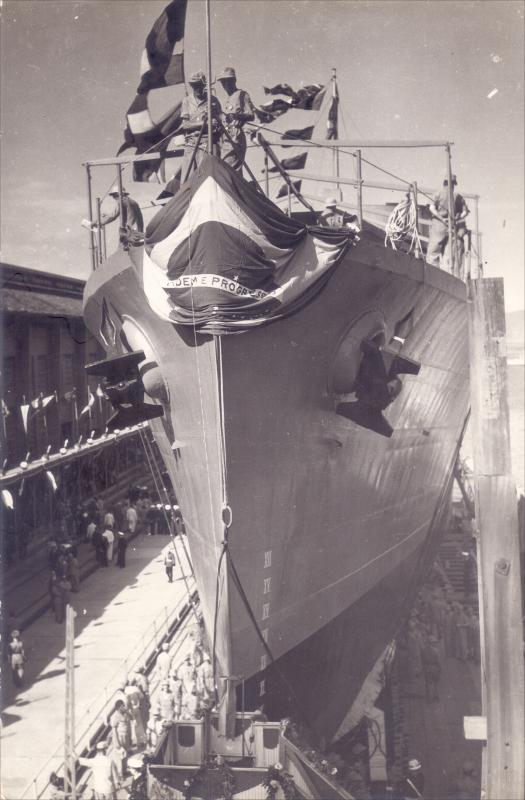
Construction of the destroyer Acre (1941)

Vargas' nationalist policy was also applied to the Brazilian Navy. The revision of the 1932 Naval Program in 1934 included plans to restore military shipbuilding. According to the Minister of the Navy, Aristides Guilhem, this would be feasible by first adapting shipyards to work with imported components. To counter industrial offers from Germany—including the construction of a port and a naval arsenal—the United States, which was competing for economic influence in Brazil, supported the Brazilian Navy. In addition to offering to build or transfer American destroyers, the U.S. Naval Mission assisted Brazilian naval construction. The plans for Mahan-class destroyers were sold at a symbolic price and used to build three Brazilian M-class destroyers. By 1945, two monitors, three submarine chasers, and six corvettes had also been assembled. However, plans to construct submarines did not materialize.

Although still dependent on imported prefabricated components, this industry had already developed an experienced technical workforce and was able to meet part of the demand for cannons, ammunition, torpedoes, and electronic equipment. Imports continued and even increased during World War II through the Lend-Lease program. The United States halted its support for Brazilian naval construction once its own production was sufficient to supply surplus ships to its allies. Additionally, U.S. foreign policy in South America shifted toward balancing military strength among nations. Imported equipment remained inexpensive in the postwar period. After the ousting of Vargas, widespread suspicion toward all measures from his administration led to the erosion of prior achievements, significantly slowing warship construction. However, during Juscelino Kubitschek's administration, investments in naval engineers and the establishment of an industrial base for producing naval components laid the groundwork for a later resurgence.

==== Aerial ====
Assembling of a Focke-Wulf Fw 58 at Galeão Air Base

Attempts to establish an aviation industry, including a military sector, date back to the 1930s. These efforts had limited success, such as the production of the Muniz M-7 and the FW 58, the latter resulting from an agreement between the navy and Focke-Wulf. The Brazilian Air Force was created in 1941, the same year the Ministry of Aeronautics was created, which was also responsible for civil aviation. Its establishment reflected a national development ambition that included an aeronautical industrial complex. However, this remained a long-term goal, as Brazil was still an agrarian country with no advanced industrial base. The key instrument to realize this ambition was the establishment of the Instituto Tecnológico de Aeronáutica (ITA) in 1950 and the Centro Técnico da Aeronáutica (CTA), which spread technical knowledge and fostered the birth of aerospace industries. The CTA is considered a landmark in the development of Brazil’s modern defense industry. The Galeão Base produced small training aircraft using foreign technology, at one point manufacturing up to one aircraft per day during the war. Additionally, many imported planes were subjected to reverse engineering.

==== For the army ====
For the supply of light weapons to the Brazilian Army, Rossi and Taurus emerged in 1889 and 1937, respectively, both headquartered in Rio Grande do Sul. Meanwhile, the Companhia Brasileira de Cartuchos (CBC) was founded in São Paulo in 1926 and gained market prominence by supplying ammunition to São Paulo’s troops during the 1932 Constitutionalist Revolution and, years later, to the Brazilian Expeditionary Force during World War II. In the postwar period, many firearms manufacturers emerged, including the Indústria Nacional de Armas (INA), founded in 1949 by a military officer who reportedly received the rights to manufacture the Danish Madsen M1946 submachine gun. This was after he participated in a Brazilian Army technical mission and helped Denmark prevent certain weapon designs from falling into Nazi hands. INA, along with CBC and the Fábrica de Itajubá (a weapons factory belonging to the Ministry of the Army, later incorporated into IMBEL in 1975), became the primary manufacturers and suppliers of firearms for military and police forces during the 1950s and 1960s.

A crucial technological issue was the adoption of motorized and mechanized vehicles. Arguments in favor of maintaining partial reliance on horses included the high cost of replacement, the insufficient transportation network, the need to import fuel, limited industrialization, and the absence of a domestic defense industry capable of producing such vehicles—though importation remained an option. An agreement with the United States allowed for some degree of motor-mechanization, but by the 1960s, its level was still low. Infantry units largely moved on foot, and a significant portion of the cavalry remained horse-drawn.

=== Apogee (1960s and 80s) ===
Concerns about dependence on foreign arms imports had already emerged during João Goulart’s presidency and continued among military leaders and geopolitical strategists after the 1964 coup. There was a strong interest in modernizing the Armed Forces to match the level of weaponry and equipment used by global powers, reducing reliance on external suppliers, gaining geopolitical influence in the Third World, and showcasing the competence of the ruling elite. As a result, various companies began adapting and developing entirely domestic projects, often based on successful foreign designs. Defense development programs date back to the 1960s, with significant industrial growth leading to a peak in the 1980s. During the 1960s, key defense companies emerged, including Avibras (1961), Engesa (1963), (Note: Or 1958.) and Embraer (1969). These companies would go on to account for more than 90% of Brazil’s arms exports during that period.

The growth of Brazil’s defense industry occurred alongside U.S. restrictions on military exports to Brazil in the 1960s, followed by the rupture of the Brazil-United States Military Agreement in 1977. It also coincided with the expansion of the capital goods industry in the 1970s, the Brazilian Economic Miracle, and later, the Lost Decade. Despite the economic downturn of the early 1980s, the defense industry continued to grow rapidly, proving resilient even amid the recession.

Brazil's developmentalist state collaborated with an entrepreneurial private sector, unlike Argentina, where the state dominated, and Chile, where its role was more limited. The government invested in military research, provided credit, operated some state-owned enterprises like IMBEL and Embraer, secured a domestic market by purchasing products, and implemented protectionist policies. Foreign involvement came through multinational corporations, joint ventures, and technology transfers. Due to U.S. reluctance to share technology, most transfers came from European countries. In 1987, foreign dependence—through co-production and licensed manufacturing—was estimated at 47%, not accounting for the large-scale importation of components, which would push the figure even higher. Brazil also engaged in industrial and technological cooperation with other developing nations, including Saudi Arabia, Argentina, China, Egypt, Iraq, and Libya.

The defense industry was highly concentrated, with Engesa, Avibras, and Embraer dominating the sector. The entire space program, aircraft production, and tank manufacturing were centered in São Paulo, while the naval sector was concentrated in Rio de Janeiro.

==== Exports ====
The state was unable to generate significant domestic demand, as public debt became a heavy burden starting in the late 1970s. Unlike Argentina and Chile, where defense industries primarily supplied national forces, Brazil’s defense industry was export-oriented, with strong international sales beginning in the 1970s. Brazil’s market strategy—targeting a niche distinct from that of major powers by offering low-cost products tailored to buyers' needs—proved successful. Clients were diverse, including the regimes of Augusto Pinochet, Saddam Hussein, and Muammar al-Gaddafi. A key factor in this success was Brazil’s general indifference to the political alignment of its customers, many of whom were under sanctions from the United States or multilateral organizations. However, all sales had to go through the Ministry of Foreign Affairs, which at times intervened—for instance, blocking the shipment of armored vehicles to El Salvador and Honduras, fearing it would escalate conflicts. There were no restrictions on the use of exported products, leading to situations like Libya purchasing equipment and transferring it to Iran, which drew U.S. protests. A 1991 U.S. Congressional report noted that the Departments of State and Commerce had restricted technology transfers to Brazil’s defense sector due to concerns about proliferation.

The Middle East accounted for 48.3% of Brazil’s arms sales between 1982 and 1986, with Iraq alone representing 38.6%. This surge was driven by the Iran-Iraq War, which created a boom in Brazilian defense exports. North Africa was also a major buyer, while in Latin America, key clients included Chile and Colombia.

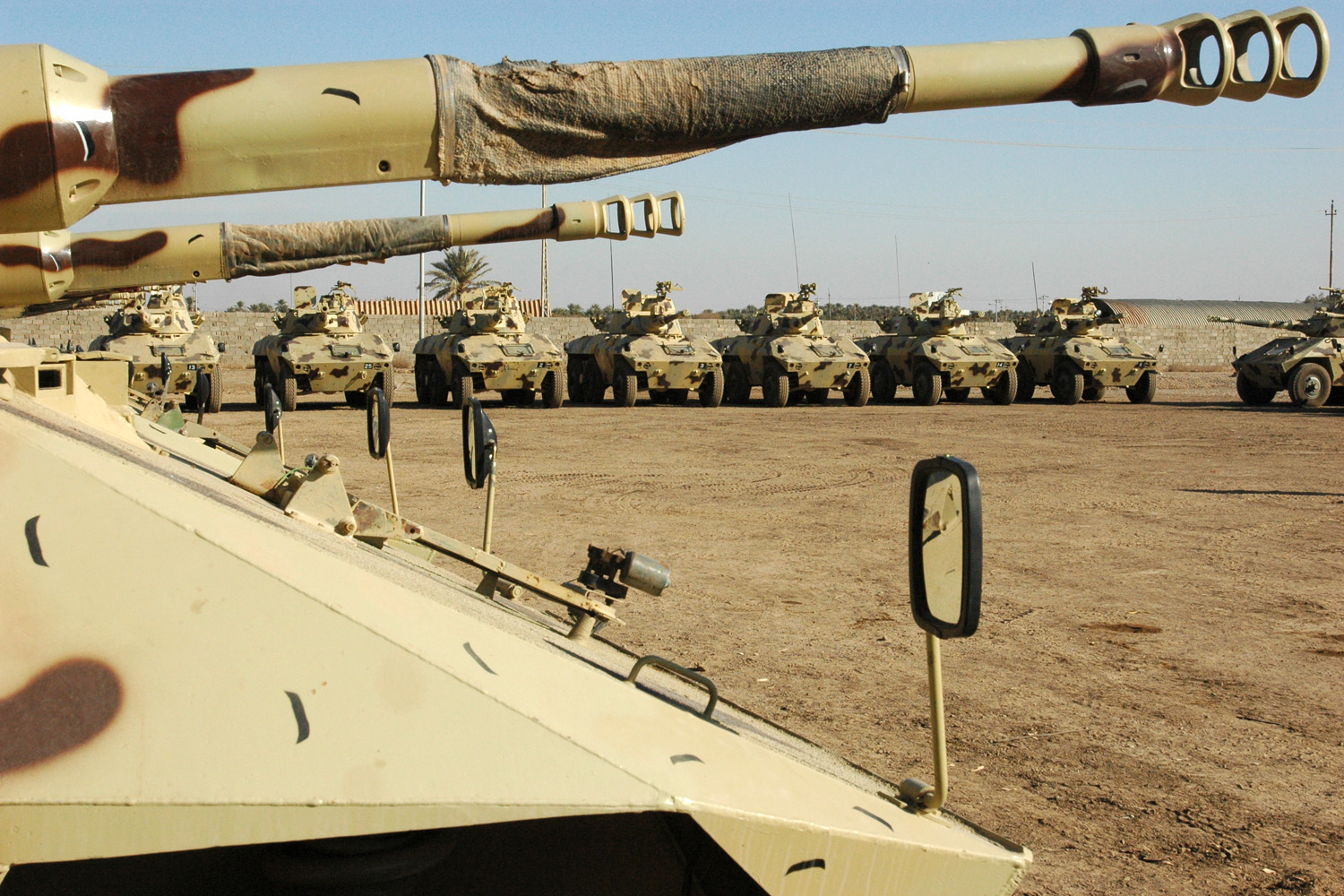
EE-9 Cascavel in Iraqi service (2008)

The international market was favorable to Brazilian arms exports. The United States, the Soviet Union, and the United Kingdom were losing ground to other powers such as France, Italy, and Germany, while more advanced developing nations were also entering the market. Technology transfer was widespread. The 1973 oil crisis increased arms purchases in the Middle East and led oil-importing countries to export weapons as a way to earn foreign currency. Brazil took advantage of this through countertrade, paying for its oil imports with arms exports. By 1986, this trade model covered 65% of Brazil’s oil imports. Former colonies, often overlooked by traditional suppliers, sought alternatives beyond their former colonial powers. Meanwhile, the heightened tensions of the Cold War from 1979 to 1985 further stimulated arms demand, as the United States restricted sales to many non-aligned countries.

Thus, the defense sector reached its peak between 1980 and 1992, managing each year—except 1981—to be among the world's top 20 arms exporters. In 1985, Brazil achieved its highest position, ranking 10th globally and accounting for approximately 1% of global arms sales that year. A conservative analysis from 2001, skeptical of the real size of the industry and accusing both the industry and the press of exaggerating its importance, cites earlier studies with the following conclusions: employment reached 39,000 workers in 1986 (representing 0.4% of industrial employment and 0.06% of the overall economy) and did not exceed 50,000 at its peak.; its share of GDP never exceeded 0.2%, while its contribution to industrial production peaked at 0.9%, resulting in a very limited overall economic impact; export value peaked at US$570 million in 1987, averaging US$186 million annually between 1975 and 1988, and it is uncertain whether the sector provided a positive net balance of trade. Other estimates for arms exports during the 1980s vary significantly, ranging from US$200 million to US$1 billion annually, or as high as US$2 billion at the 1985–1986 peak.

=== Companies ===
==== Armored vehicles ====
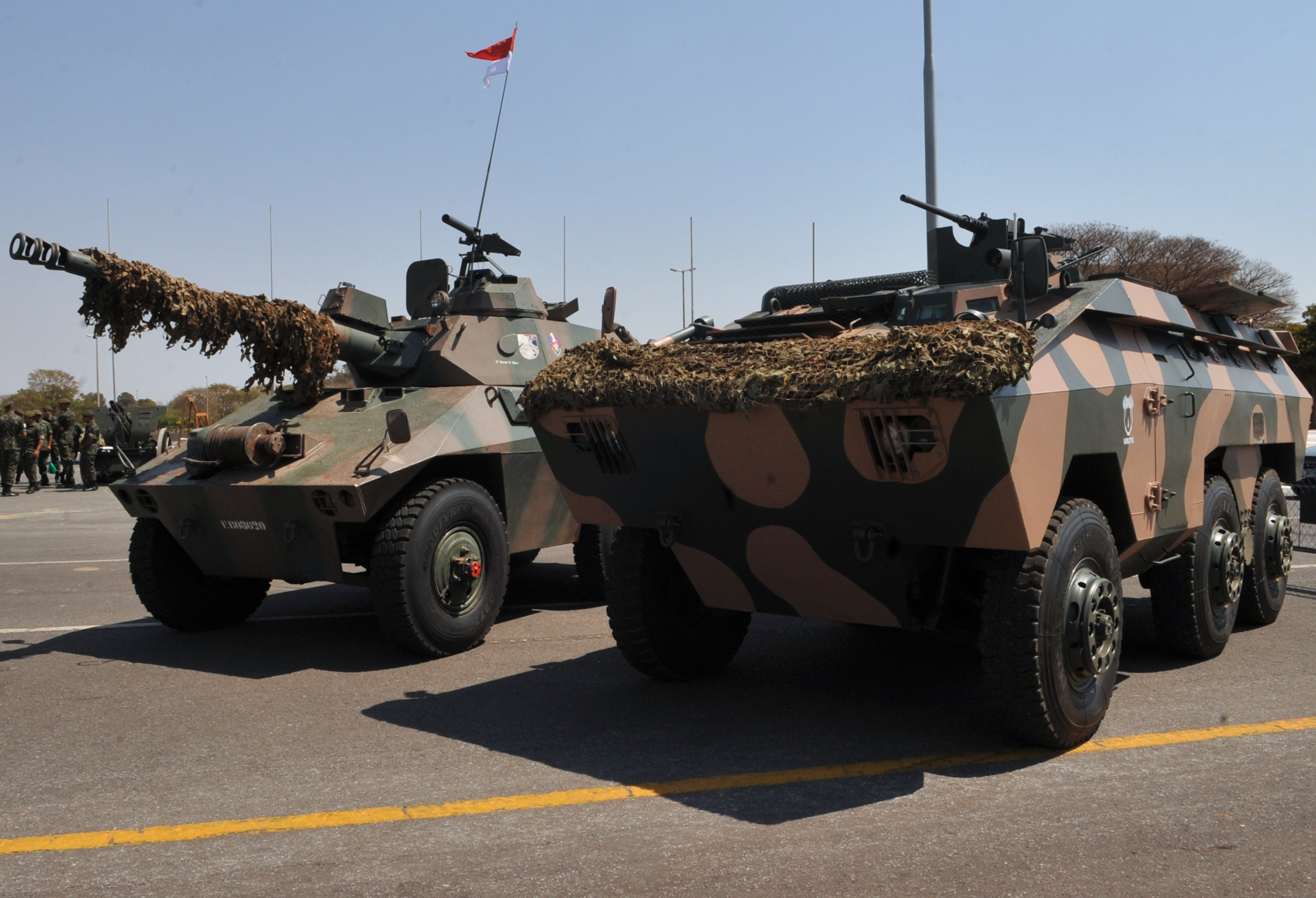
Cascavel (left) and Urutu (right)

In the armored vehicle sector, Engesa was the dominant company, with smaller contributions from Bernardini, Biselli, Novatração, Gurgel, and Motopeças. The broader land vehicle sector was more extensive. From the 1960s and 1970s onward, nearly the entire fleet of non-armored vehicles used by the Brazilian Army was supplied by domestic manufacturers. This included buses, vans, general transport pickups, ambulances, and various types of trucks, such as cargo, tanker, workshop, and all-terrain trucks. Key manufacturers included Willys (e.g., Rural), Chevrolet (e.g., Veraneio), and Volkswagen, while Engesa specialized in adapting and militarizing many of these trucks.

At the same time, the need for motorization and mechanization had become undeniable, and previous counterarguments were no longer valid. By this period, Petrobras was supplying fuel, the road network and industrial base were sufficiently developed, and GDP had grown significantly. As a result, infantry brigades and battalions became motorized, cavalry units were mechanized, and the number of armored units increased.

The supply of mechanized and armored formations required a three-stage project by the army in São Paulo. At first, national engines and mechanical components were adapted to imported vehicles in the mid-1960s, successfully modernizing the M8 Greyhound reconnaissance vehicles. Then, national wheeled armored vehicles were developed, the EE-9 Cascavel and EE-11 Urutu by Engesa, national and international successes. Between 1,352 and 1,758 Cascavels and between 420 and 888 Urutus were sold. Finally, the development of tracked armored vehicles began parallel to the previous phases with the modernization of the M2 Half-track and M3 Stuart, with the main participation of Biselli and Bernardini. The M41 Walker Bulldog was also modernized. This stage culminated in the 1980s with the development of two main battle tanks, the MB-3 Tamoyo by Bernardini and the EE-T1 Osório by Engesa, which, however, did not find a buyer.
