= Bernardini MB-3 Tamoyo =

MB-3 Tamoyo
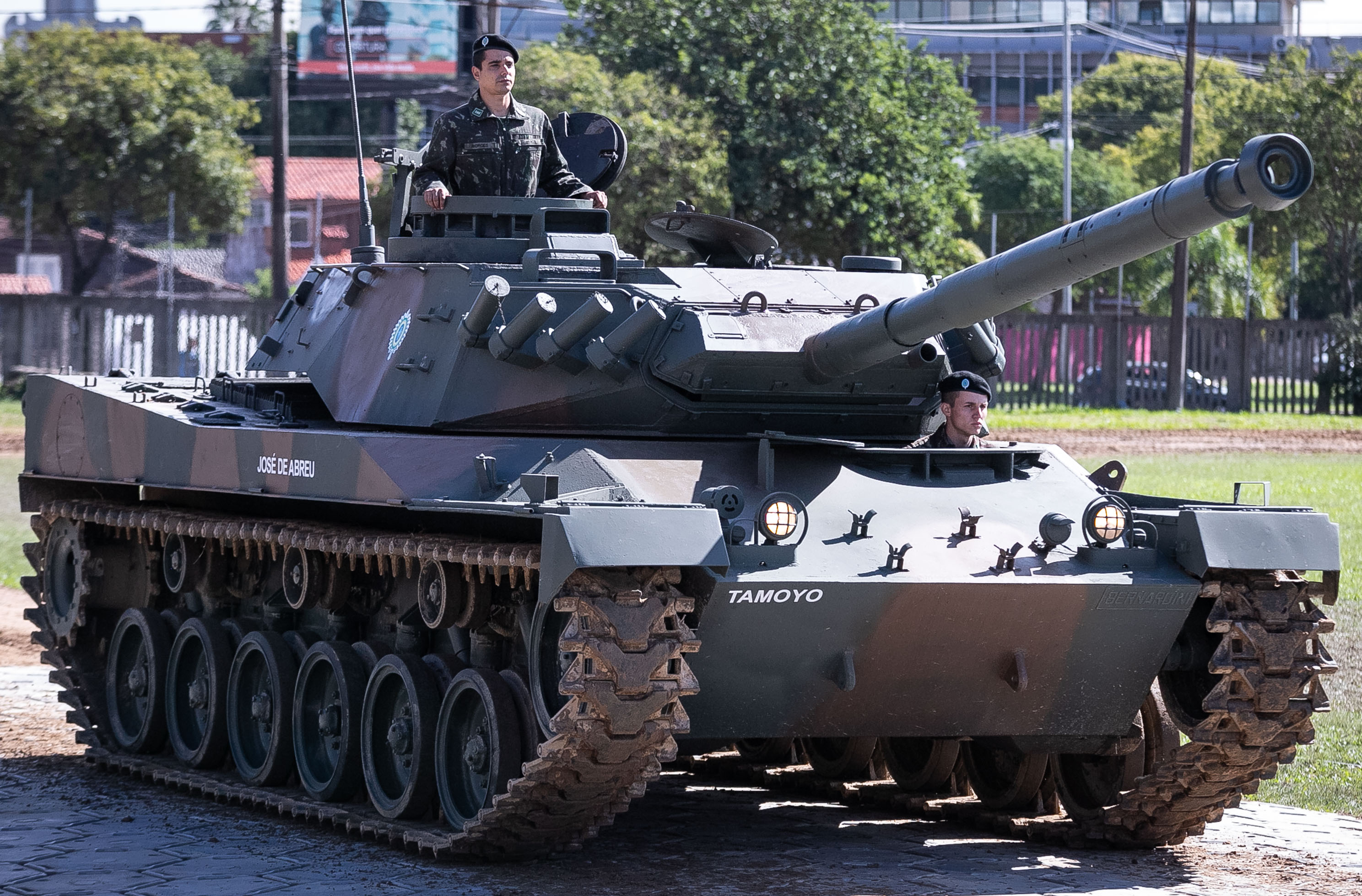
- Type: Main battle tank
- Place of origin: Brazil

Production history
- Designed: 1983
- Manufacturer: Bernardini S/A Indústria e Comércio

Specifications
- Mass: 30 t
- Length: 6.5 m (hull)
- Width: 3.2 m
- Height: 2.5 m
- Crew: 4
- Main armament: Bernardini 90 mm canon
- Secondary armament: 1 x FN-MAG 7.62 mm machine gun, 1 x 12.7 mm M2 HB MG
- Engine: Saab-Scania DSI-14; 368 kW
- Power/weight: 12.3(kW/t)
- Transmission: Allison CD-500 Mechanic or General Electric HMPT-500 Automatic
- Suspension: Torsion Bars
- Operational range: 550km
- Maximum speed: 67 km/h

The Bernardini MB-3 Tamoyo was a Brazilian main battle tank designed by Bernardini; however, it never reached production status and it never passed beyond the prototype stage (1983). It was followed by the EE-T1 Osório in 1984, the EE-T2 Osório in 1985, and the Tamoyo III in 1987. The tank was armed with a 90mm gun and carried 68 rounds of ammunition.

Based on the US M41 Walker Bulldog, which Bernardini had been upgrading for the Brazilian Armed Forces to the M41B and C configurations (new Scania V-8 diesel engine, modified electrical system, addition of night sights and laser range finder, side skirts, additional spaced armour for the forward part of the hull, glacis plate and turret and replacement of the original 76 mm gun with a 90 mm one), the follow on MB-3 Tamoyo had a lengthened hull and an additional road wheel. Initially armed with a 90 mm rifled main gun manufactured in Brazil by Bernardini. The final model, the Tamoyo III was armed with a NATO 105 mm L7 rifled main gun.
