= M41 Walker Bulldog =

Cold War-era American light tank

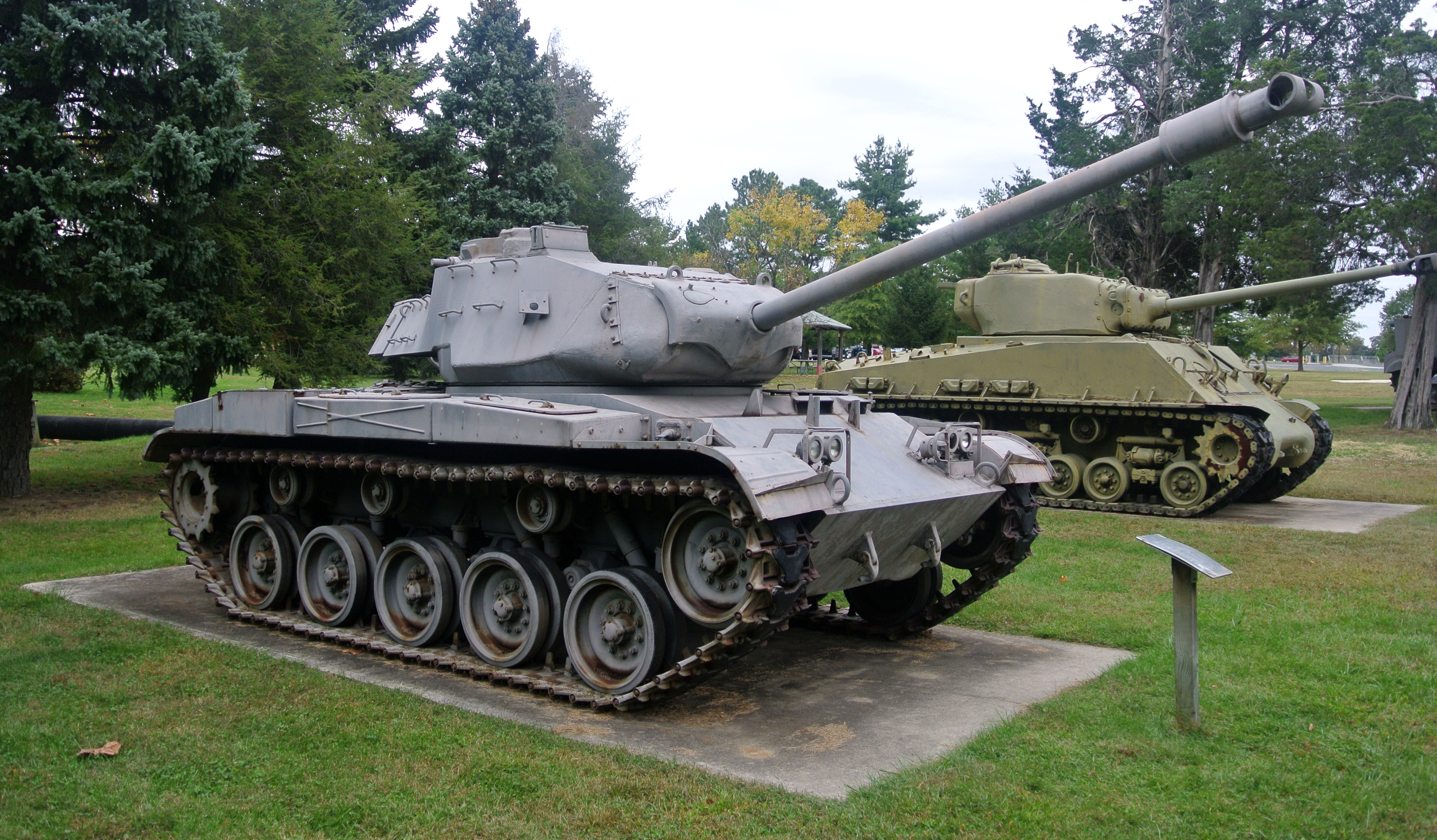
- M41 Bulldog tank at Fort Meade Museum, Maryland.
- Type: Light tank
- Place of origin: United States

Service history
- In service: 1953–1969 (US Armed Forces) 1961–present (foreign users)
- Used by: See Operators
- Wars: Bay of Pigs Invasion; Guatemalan Civil War; 1964 Brazilian coup d'état Vietnam War; Ethiopian Civil War; Lebanese Civil War; Ogaden War; Sino-Vietnamese War; Somali Civil War; 2006 Thai coup d'état 2025 Cambodia-Thailand conflict

Production history
- Designed: 1944
- Manufacturer: Cadillac
- Unit cost: USD $162,000 (secondhand, FY1988) (equivalent to $379,905 in 2025)
- Produced: 1951–1954
- No. built: 5,467
- Variants: See Variants

Specifications
- Mass: 23.49 tonnes (25.89 short tons; 23.12 long tons)
- Length: 5.81 m (19 ft 1 in) (hull)
- Width: 3.19 m (10 ft 6 in)
- Height: 2.72 m (8 ft 11 in)
- Crew: 4 (commander, gunner, loader, driver)
- Armor: Welded steel 25.4 mm (1.00 in) turret front 25 mm (0.98 in) turret sides and rear 12.7 mm (0.50 in) turret top 31.7 mm (1.25 in) at 30° hull upper glacis plate 25.4 mm (1.00 in) at 45° hull lower glacis plate 19 mm (0.75 in) hull rear 9.25 mm (0.364 in) hull floor
- Main armament: 76 mm M32A1 rifled cannon (65 rounds)
- Secondary armament: .30 caliber M1919A4 coaxial machine gun (5,000 rounds); .50 caliber Browning M2 roof-mounted machine gun (2,175 rounds)
- Engine: Continental AOS-895-3 six-cylinder air-cooled gasoline 500 bhp (370 kW)
- Power/weight: 21.2 hp (15.8 kW)/tonne
- Suspension: Torsion bar
- Ground clearance: 0.45 m (1.5 ft)
- Fuel capacity: 530 L (140 US gal)
- Operational range: 161 km (100 mi)
- Maximum speed: 72.4 km/h (45.0 mph)

The M41 Walker Bulldog, officially 76-mm gun tank M41, is an American light tank that was developed for armed reconnaissance purposes. The M41 Walker Bulldog was produced by Cadillac between 1951 and 1954, who marketed it successfully to the United States Army as a replacement for its aging fleet of World War II-vintage M24 Chaffee tanks. Although engineered as a reconnaissance vehicle, the M41's weight and armament also made it effective for close infantry support and for rapid airborne deployments. Upon entering US service, all M41s received the designation Little Bulldog and subsequently, Walker Bulldog after the late General Walton Walker, who was killed in a Jeep accident in 1950. The M41 was the first postwar American light tank to see worldwide service, and was exported in considerable numbers by the United States (particularly to Asia).

Development of the M41 proceeded slowly until the outbreak of the Korean War, when the US Army's renewed demands for more tanks resulted in the M41 being rushed into production. The haste with which it was initially produced led to technical problems, which, coupled with the relatively cramped dimensions of its hull interior and its poor armament, gave it a mediocre reputation among American tank crews. It was also considered too large for a reconnaissance vehicle. Funding for the M41 program was slashed accordingly, and more emphasis placed on the development of new main battle tanks such as the M47 Patton. Cadillac ceased production of the M41A1 in late 1954. It was replaced by the M551 Sheridan during the 1960s, when the gun could no longer penetrate fielded medium tanks.

== Development ==
Beginning in 1946, the United States Army commissioned a project to oversee the replacement of the M24 Chaffee light tank in the reconnaissance role. For preliminary purposes, this hypothetical tank was to be known as T37. However, in the wake of World War II most armored vehicle development programs suffered from a lack of impetus and inadequate funding. The T37 concept did not reach viability until 1949, when three disparate prototypes were finally built. The second prototype of the trio, T37 Phase Two, was selected for further testing and received a unique designation, T41. In its final, pre-production form this model was known as T41E1 to the US Army.

The T41E1 was envisaged as a highly mobile light tank, capable of undertaking aggressive reconnaissance and being sufficiently armed to engage the latest Soviet medium tanks if necessary. It was to utilize automotive parts and components already common to other US military vehicles, and incorporate a modular hull capable of being converted for a variety of other specialized roles — for example, the US Army requirement called not only for a light tank, but an air defense platform and an armored personnel carrier based on the same chassis. A specific powerplant had even been pre-selected for all three proposed vehicles: a Continental or Lycoming six-cylinder, air-cooled gasoline engine. This made the T41E1 one of the first American tanks to be designed around a preexisting engine type, rather than being built first and then adopting a suitable engine. Weighing nearly 52,000 pounds, the T41E1 was so heavy that it would have easily been classed as a medium tank in its own right only five years earlier, and was no longer deemed suitable for frequent airborne deployments.

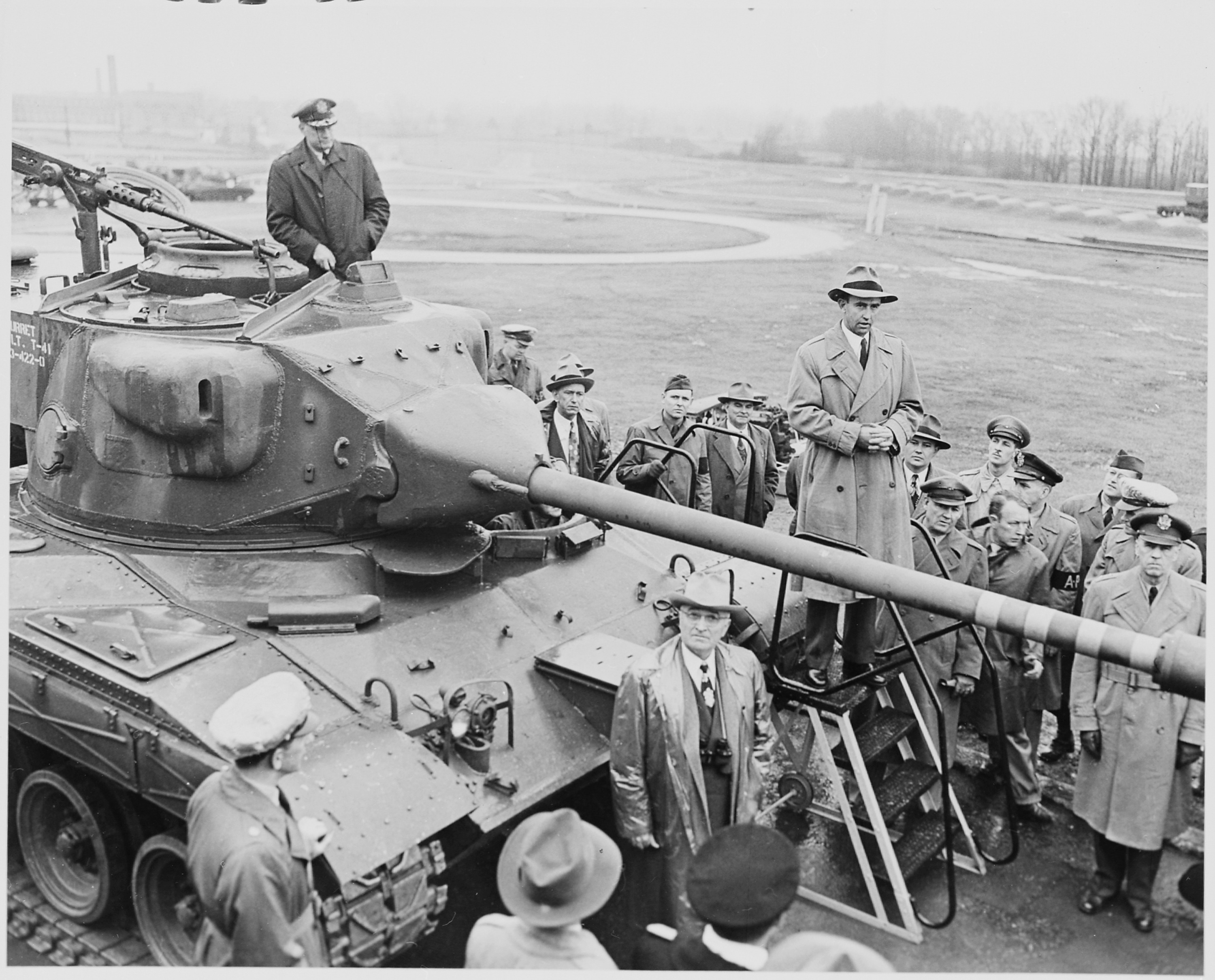
President Harry Truman with a T41 prototype undergoing trials at Aberdeen Proving Ground.

The Army placed orders for the T41 circa August 1950. The tank was christened the "Walker Bulldog"—after the late General Walton Walker who was killed in a Jeep accident a year earlier—at a demonstration for President Harry S. Truman at Aberdeen Proving Ground in February 1951.

Serial production was delayed by technical difficulties stemming from the decision to incorporate an integral rangefinder directly into the steel turret. A renewed sense of urgency introduced by the outbreak of the Korean War and increasing demands by the US Army for more tanks resulted in production hurriedly commencing in mid-1951. The hasty production cycle led to numerous modifications during the course of and after manufacture. Cadillac repurposed a warehouse in Cleveland in August 1950 and began outfitting the location for production of the Walker Bulldog and other combat vehicles, namely the Cadillac M42 Duster. The plant, employing 3700, delivered the first production M41 Walker Bulldog in March 1951. The first eight Bulldogs were delivered to the US Army in July.

By March 1952 over 900 M41s had already been manufactured. These entered service too late to take part in the Korean War, though some may have been shipped out to US forces in that region just as the fighting ended. Roughly 1,802 were built, but these suffered from a variety of technical issues due to their somewhat rushed production, and a second mark, the M41A1, was introduced to correct these problems. Over 4,000 engineering design changes were requested by the US Army between July 1951 and July 1952. Approval to issue the M41 type to regular units was denied until December 1952, when the new mark was introduced. Another 1,631 baseline M41s were also relegated to storage at the Ordnance Corps Depot in Lima, Ohio until their deficiencies could be corrected.

The M41A1 was later superseded by the M41A2 and M41A3, which had the advantage of greater ammunition stowage, and considerably simplified gun and turret systems. Despite these detail improvements, the M41 series did not prove especially popular in US service. Crew members seated in the turret often complained of limited interior space. Reconnaissance units criticized the height and size of the design, which reduced its ability to reconnoiter discreetly, and although it was intended for employment with airborne units, its weight made it impractical for airdrops. This led to the development of the M551 Sheridan, which was designed for airdrops, and in which low combat weight was considered a key factor. M41 production ceased around late 1954, allowing the US Army to refocus on developing medium tanks such as the M47 Patton. As early as mid-1952 the US government had become so disillusioned by the M41's perceived shortcomings that it recommended the M41 acquisition process be terminated and a new light tank development project initiated; however, General J. Lawton Collins, then Army Chief of Staff, successfully argued for the existing purchase orders to be filled.

With the introduction of increasingly well-armored Soviet main battle tanks, the M41 was no longer perceived as powerful enough for frontline service, and it was replaced by the much lighter and more heavily armed Sheridan during the late 1960s. Most second-hand US M41s were refurbished and subsequently sold or donated to US allies abroad, namely Brazil, Japan, and South Vietnam.

=== Derivatives ===
When the M41 entered production, it was not considered economical to simply manufacture a single tank chassis and hull. The US Army wanted the M41 series to include various supporting vehicles built using the same chassis, engine, tracks and as many as other associated automotive components as possible to simplify logistics. Cadillac obligingly produced the M42 Duster anti-aircraft vehicle, as well as the M44 and M52 self-propelled howitzers, and the M75 armored personnel carrier, all based on an M41 chassis and drive train. The acquisition process for these vehicles was risky because unlike the M41, no prototype or test models were manufactured and trialed. In January 1951, under intense pressure to meet the US Army's requirements, representatives of the Army Ordnance Corps agreed to approve the anti-aircraft platform, self-propelled guns, and armored personnel carrier for production "with the full knowledge that in doing so there were certain inherent risks involved by forgoing complete tests and evaluation". The technical problems encountered with the series, coupled with those of the M41 in general, led to the US Army only adopting the M75 in large numbers.

== Service history ==
=== Bay of Pigs Invasion ===
During the prelude to the Bay of Pigs Invasion, the Central Intelligence Agency proposed creating a single tank platoon composed of anti-communist exiles to support Brigade 2506's incursion and subsequent seizure of strategic sites in Cuba likely to be patrolled or defended by armor, mostly Soviet-supplied T-34-85 medium tanks. To that end, the CIA procured five M41 tanks from US Army reserve stocks and earmarked them for this purpose. American instructors trained the prospective Cuban tank crews at Fort Knox in March 1961, teaching them driving and gunnery basics. The tanks were transported to the Cuban coast by a single Mechanized Landing Craft on April 17, then came ashore with infantry support in a combined arms amphibious assault on Playa Girón. Due to a lack of adequate air support, the brigadista M41s had to land under heavy fire from circling Cuban aircraft, although all of the tanks succeeded in advancing past the beach intact. They immediately attacked a local airstrip, inflicting heavy casualties among the defending Cuban militiamen, who did not possess adequate anti-tank weapons. The militia organized an ill-advised counterattack with a single battalion, which was annihilated by the tanks and brigadista mortar crews in an engagement remembered in Cuba as the "Slaughter of the Lost Battalion".

Although the exiles had arrived at multiple landing sites, since Playa Girón was the furthest inland Cuban president Fidel Castro ordered the military to concentrate on destroying the exile force there. Four infantry battalions and two companies of Cuban T-34-85 tanks were ordered to retake the airfield and beachhead, but their radio transmissions were intercepted by the exiles, allowing them to plan their defense accordingly. The Cuban forces shelled Playa Girón with artillery around midnight, then advanced towards the village by road, with the T-34-85s in the lead. Three M41s which had taken up positions directly opposite the road junction nearest the beach then opened fire on the column at extremely close range. At least two T-34-85s were initially destroyed, a third disabled by track damage, and a fourth captured by the rebels intact when its crew surrendered. The M41s succeeded in knocking out several more attacking T-34-85s which became stranded on the narrow road and bottlenecked due to difficulties their crews encountered in skirting the existing wreckage. However, this success was short-lived: the unexpectedly heavy resistance encountered by Cuban armor ensured that by noon the following afternoon all the M41 crews had exhausted their ammunition.

At one point American Defense Secretary Robert McNamara proposed using the US Navy vessels within the vicinity to move another eight M41s and their associated ammunition to support the exiles; however, without sufficient supplies or air support Brigade 2506 was unable to hold its positions against repeated Cuban armored attacks and was overwhelmed. The surviving M41s were abandoned on the beach near Playa Girón when the invasion ended.

=== Vietnam War ===
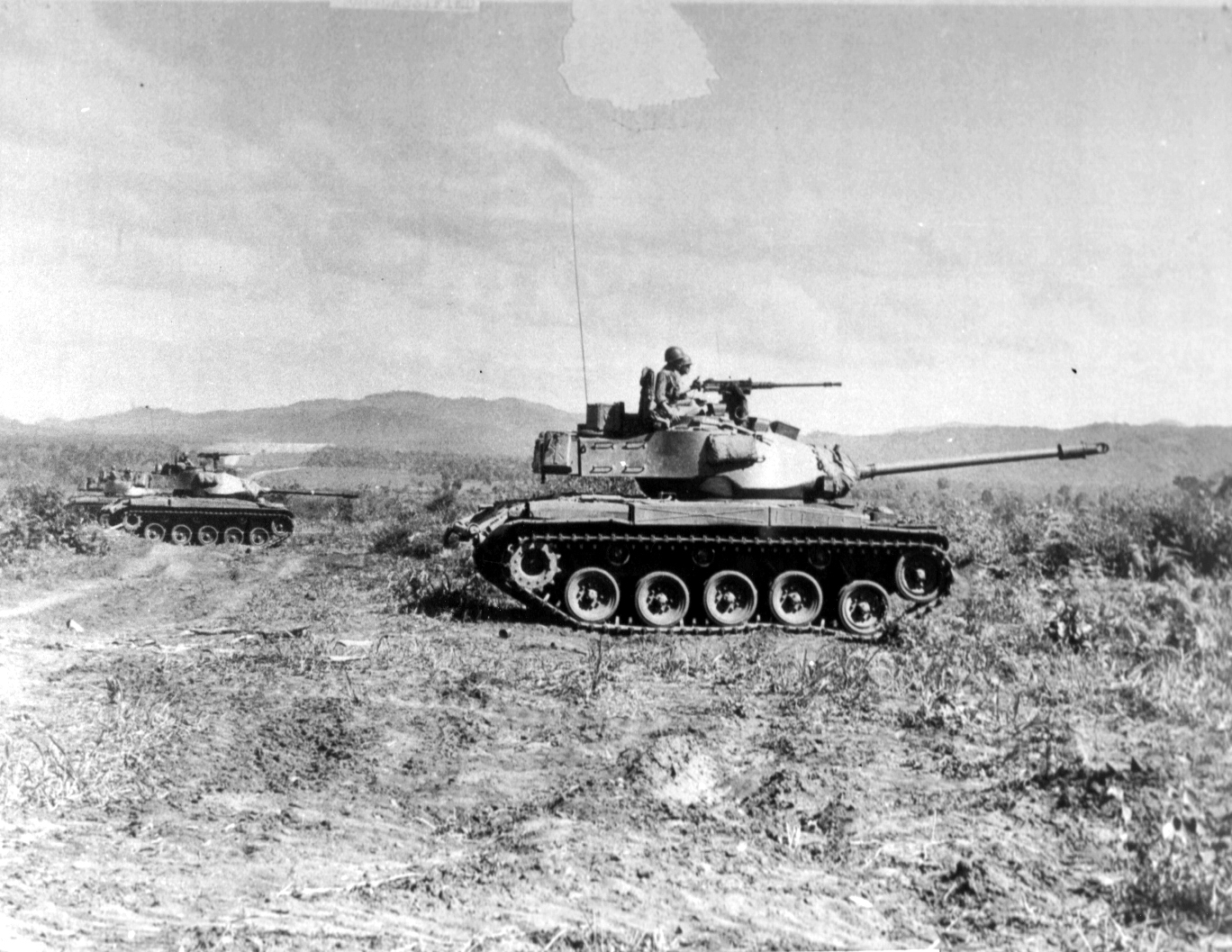
South Vietnamese M41 tanks during a training operation.

The Army of the Republic of Vietnam (ARVN)'s fledgling armored corps had its roots in a colonial armored corps established by French Indochina in 1950 and equipped with old M24 Chaffee and M5 Stuart light tanks. Throughout the 1950s and early 1960s South Vietnamese armor was not used in offensive maneuvers and was often unserviceable due to logistical problems and age. With the formation of the Military Assistance Command, Vietnam (MACV) in 1962, US influence on ARVN doctrine grew; all armored units were subsequently reorganized and patterned after the US cavalry regiments. American advisers also made a concerted attempted to refurbish the ARVN M24 fleet but encountered sourcing problems with the US Army supply system's dwindling stock of M24 parts, most of which had already been disposed of or donated to other countries. They arranged to have the engines from the ARVN M24s periodically sent to Japan for overhaul, but this was considered neither practical nor economic in the long term.

In mid-1964, as part of a greater effort to introduce more modern equipment to the ARVN, the MACV proposed that the South Vietnamese armored corps be increased by five tank squadrons. Between January and April 1965 all the ARVN M24s were decommissioned or passed to the Republic of Vietnam Air Force base security units and replaced by M41A3s. The M41 proved extremely popular with South Vietnamese tank crews, who were generally of smaller stature than their American counterparts and did not experience the same discomfort operating within the tank's limited interior space. ARVN M41s undertook their first combat employment less than a year later, and played an instrumental role in crushing the 1966 Buddhist Uprising. The tanks were mostly used to support ARVN infantry in street fighting, especially around Da Nang.

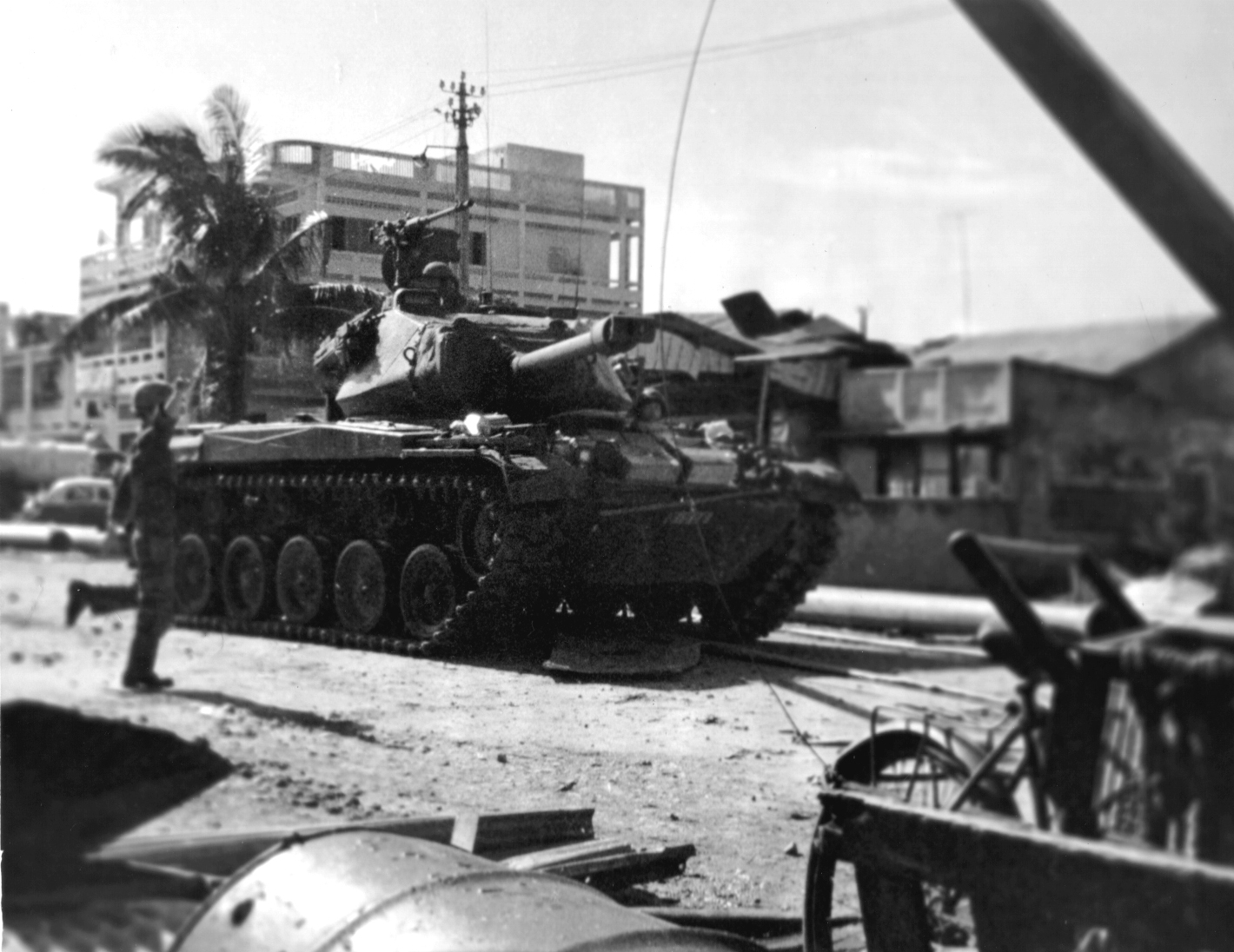
ARVN M41 operating against enemy positions in Saigon, 1968.

Seventeen ARVN M41s were initially sent into Laos as part of Operation Lam Son 719 between February and March 1971, an abortive cross-border incursion to disrupt strategic supply lines for the People's Army of Vietnam (PAVN) and the Viet Cong. The tanks were to coordinate their actions with several ARVN heliborne and paratroop units, who would be joining them by air. Their offensive soon stalled when a PAVN tank battalion equipped with T-54 and PT-76 tanks attempted to overrun one of the ARVN's designated landing zones. In the first major armor engagement of the Vietnam War, the M41s counterattacked, and ARVN claimed six T-54s and seventeen PT-76s were destroyed. Five M41s and 25 APCs were lost during the same encounter, mostly to land mines and rocket-propelled grenades. However, the PAVN continued to regroup and counterattack over the next week, forcing the outnumbered South Vietnamese units to abandon the landing zone and withdraw further south. Failure to maintain a cohesive withdrawal led to individual infantry or mechanized units with no armor support of their own being cut off and surrounded by PAVN tanks.

ARVN commanders declared they did not possess enough tanks or anti-tank weapons to eliminate the PAVN armored threat, which had been underestimated during their operational planning. For the remainder of the operation, the M41s were dug into defensive positions and essentially used as static artillery. This prevented the ARVN from taking full advantage of their mobility, and units elsewhere had to depend solely on well-timed air support from South Vietnamese or US bombers to stave off PAVN tanks. Armor reinforcements were eventually dispatched to help bolster the ARVN forces in Laos, but these arrived piecemeal and it is unclear how many additional M41s actually reached the operational area. Due in part to conflicting orders, the final ARVN withdrawal from Laos, conducted while under pursuit from PAVN T-54s, was disorderly and resulted in a number of M41s being abandoned intact by their crews. The ARVN lost 54 M41 tanks during its abortive incursion into Laos.

During the PAVN Easter Offensive of 1972, M41s were again dug into static positions, and typically engaged attacking T-54 or Type 59 tanks from defile. As this tactic sacrificed the tanks' superior maneuverability, the PAVN tanks responded with flanking movements which enveloped and overran the M41s before they could maneuver. North Vietnamese infantrymen also succeeded in knocking out several platoons of static M41s with 9M14 Malyutka (AT-3 Sagger) anti-tank guided missiles. Still others were captured, and used by the PAVN at the Battle of An Lộc, where defending US troops were forced to destroy them with M72 LAWs.

Between 1965 and 1972 the U.S. had shipped 580 second-hand M41A3s to supply various ARVN tank units and replace losses sustained in combat. According to SIPRI, between 1972 and 1974 the ARVN only took delivery of M48 Pattons, which gradually superseded the M41 as the primary tank in South Vietnamese service. According to MACV South Vietnam received 19 M41 tanks during 1974.

During the PAVN's 1975 Spring Offensive, 300 ARVN M41s were destroyed or captured.

=== Other foreign service ===
==== Argentina ====
During the early 1960s, Argentina received five M41s on ostensibly permanent loan from the United States. The terms of the transfer remain unclear, as despite formally entering service with the Argentine Army the five tanks were still listed as property of the American government. They were first publicly paraded in Buenos Aires following the 1966 coup. Shortly afterwards, Argentine leaders ordered the tanks withdrawn from service and returned to the US due to continued political differences between the two countries. They were superseded in Argentine service by the AMX-13, and a proposal to purchase or request the loan of more M41s from the US was canceled.

==== Brazil ====
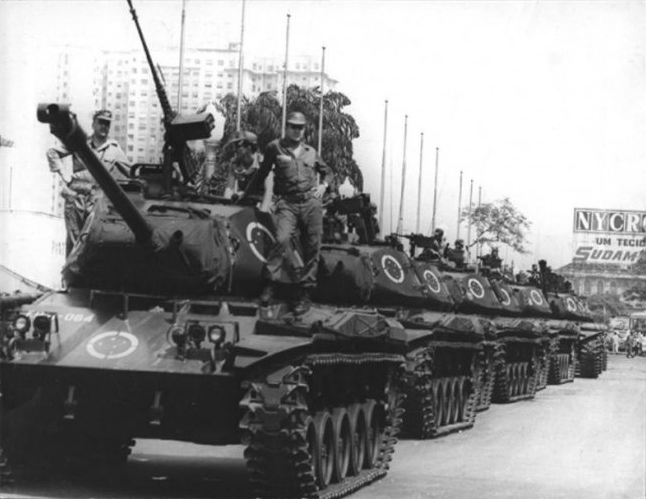
Brazilian M41s in the streets of Rio de Janeiro, April 1968.

The M41 was the first tank to be adopted in large quantities by Brazil's armed forces, and formed the armored mainstay of both the Brazilian Army and the Brazilian Marine Corps well into the twenty-first century. In 1960, an initiative to modernize existing Brazilian armored units led to the purchase of 386 second-hand M41s from the US government. The tanks were delivered in successive shipments over a period of seven years. Between 1984 and 1985, Bernardini S/A Industria e Comercio, an industrial firm in São Paulo, rebuilt and modernized all the Brazilian M41s to prolong their service life. The principal features of the modernization program were a replacement of the original Chrysler petrol engine with a diesel model, thicker armor, and replacement of the 76 mm gun with a 90 mm gun produced by boring out the original armament. The rebored gun was modified to fire Belgian fin-stabilized, shaped charge projectiles developed for the Cockerill Mk. III smoothbore cannon already fitted to Brazil's preexisting fleet of EE-9 Cascavel armored cars. The tank's transmission was also upgraded to increase acceleration and give it a maximum road speed of 70 km/h (45 mph). In Brazilian service, these upgraded M41s received the designation M41B and M41C.

==== Lebanon ====
In 1958, the Lebanese Army received either 20 to 50 M41A3 tanks from the US to replace its fleet of obsolete British Sherman Firefly medium tanks and French Hotchkiss H35 and Renault R35 light tanks employed during the 1958 Lebanon crisis. The Lebanese Army M41s first saw action on 21 November 1969, when they engaged Palestine Liberation Organization (PLO) guerrillas at the town of Nabatiyeh during the border clashes in the Rashaya district of southern Lebanon, and again at the Souk el-Khan sector of "Fatahland" in the early 1970s.

Later during the Lebanese Civil War, M41s were extensively employed by the Lebanese Army and various armed groups in and outside Beirut between 1975 and 1977, following the collapse of the Lebanese Armed Forces (LAF) structure in January 1976. During this period, most of the regular Army's M41s fell into the hands of the competing Christian-rightist Lebanese Front and Muslim-leftist Lebanese National Movement (LNM) militias or were taken way by dissident rebellious Lebanese Army factions. Captured M41s were employed by the Lebanese Arab Army (LAA), Army of Free Lebanon (AFL), Kataeb Regulatory Forces (KRF), Tigers Militia, and the People's Liberation Army (PLA). At least 18 M41s were eventually returned by the militias to the Lebanese Army in 1977–78, and remained in service until the 1983-84 Mountain War, when they were retired and quickly replaced by M48A1 and M48A5 main battle tanks provided by the US and Jordan.

==== New Zealand ====
In 1960, the Royal New Zealand Armoured Corps procured ten M41s from the US to replace its obsolete Valentine tanks, which had been inherited from its close association with the British Army during World War II. As a result of their adoption and the retirement of the Valentines, the organization of New Zealand's armored corps was altered from two tank squadrons to a single cavalry squadron consisting of M41s and M113 armored personnel carriers. The decision to acquire the new tanks was made a year earlier, in 1959, and this allowed army maintenance technicians to be sent to the US well in advance and receive the necessary familiarization training at Fort Knox before the tanks reached New Zealand. After the acceleration of the US military commitment to Vietnam, General Maxwell D. Taylor suggested the New Zealand M41s be deployed there to support allied operations. The proposal was rejected, but Australia offered to send a squadron of Centurion tanks in their stead.

By 1978, New Zealand's M41s were no longer regarded as cost-effective due to their increasing age, as well as an inadequate budget for their continued maintenance. The Ministry of Defence argued that a cheaper light tank was needed, and in 1983 the M41s were decommissioned and replaced by the FV101 Scorpion. Only one was retained in operational condition; this was donated to the New Zealand National Army Museum.

==== South Africa ====
During the mid to late 1970s, the purported presence of M41 Walker Bulldog tanks in the South African Defence Force (SADF) aroused international interest, especially when press reports suggested they had been used as part of Operation Savannah, a controversial 1975 South African military incursion into Angola. In 1977, an economist named Sean Gervasi at the Fernand Braudel Center claimed that the SADF was in possession of 100 M41s. Similar figures were subsequently repeated in a variety of literature and academic sources.

As a voluntary arms embargo had been imposed on South Africa due to the passage of United Nations Security Council Resolution 181, Gervasi was invited to testify on this claim before the US House of Representatives, which had a subcommittee on African relations. According to the minutes from the discussion, the delivery of one M41 Walker Bulldog to South Africa was acknowledged by the Department of State, presumably for evaluation purposes, although this took place in the early 1950s and predated the arms embargo. William H. Lewis, director of the Bureau of Inter-African Affairs at the State Department, debunked Gervasi's allegations that the US had supplied South Africa with a large stockpile of tanks.

As late as 1982 the Angolan government continued to make unsubstantiated claims that US-supplied M41s were being used during South African raids into Angola.

==== Taiwan ====
The Republic of China Army (ROCA) began receiving M41A3s as military aid from the US in 1958. The ROCA once had 700 M41s in various configurations in service. Those in front-line service received heavy upgrades and were redesignated M41D; the non-upgraded M41A3s were relegated to training and reserve roles. In February 2022, the ROCA announced it would be retiring its remaining M41A3s, although the M41D would remain in service.

==== Uruguay ====
Uruguay embarked on a significant revitalization campaign for its armored corps in 1981, purchasing 20 FN-4RM/62F light armored cars and 22 M41A1 Walker Bulldog tanks from Belgium. The tanks underwent a significant rebuild prior to their export, including the installation of new armor plate by a German contractor, and replacement of the turret armament with a 90 mm Cockerill Mk. IV cannon and an FN MAG co-axial machine gun, respectively. The new cannon fired fin-stabilized high explosive anti-tank (HEAT) and high explosive squash head (HESH) shells. These M41s were designated M41A1U and were retrofitted with diesel engines by a Brazilian firm in 1991.

==== West Germany ====
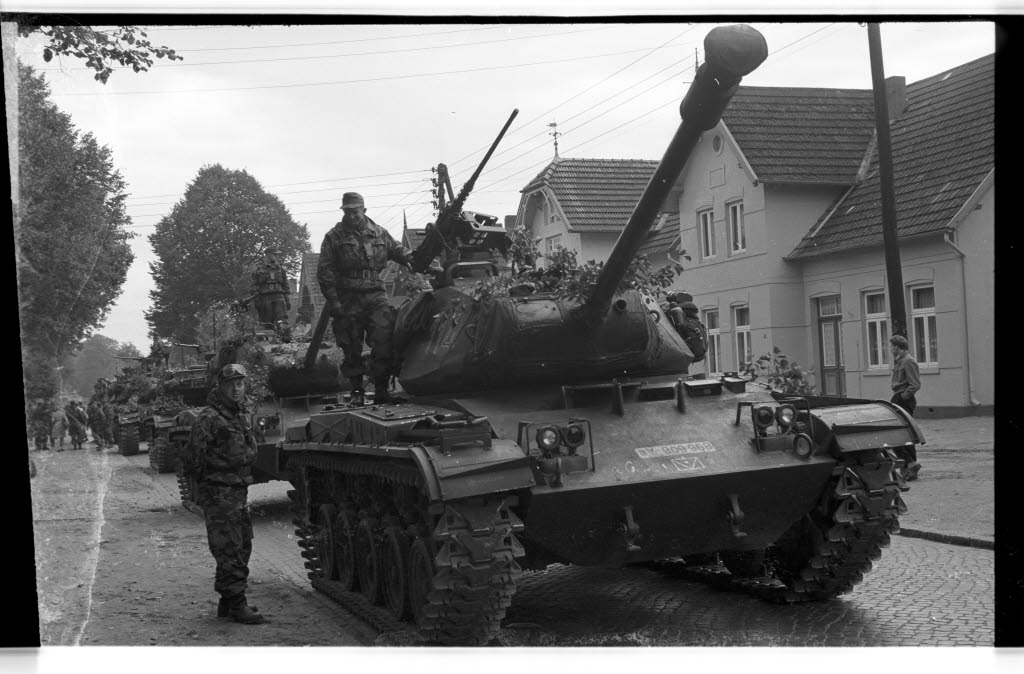
M41 tank of the 3rd Panzer Division's Kampfgruppe A 3 during the Manöver Südwind exercise in the Trittau and Neumünster area, 2 October 1957.

The M41 Walker Bulldog was the first postwar tank to be adopted by the Bundeswehr after its formation in 1955. In German service, it was primarily utilized for its traditional role of reconnaissance. Each Bundeswehr division was organized with an integral armored reconnaissance battalion of one M41 company and two companies of Schützenpanzer SPz 11-2 Kurz tracked scout vehicles. The concept of light tanks proved unpopular with the Bundeswehr, and by 1966 all its M41s had been retired and replaced with the much heavier M48 Patton and Leopard 1 in armored reconnaissance battalions. Additionally, the M41 was used in a tank destroyer role until 1969, first in divisional tank destroyer battalions and later also in the tank destroyer platoon of the heavy company of a mechanized infantry battalion.

== Description ==
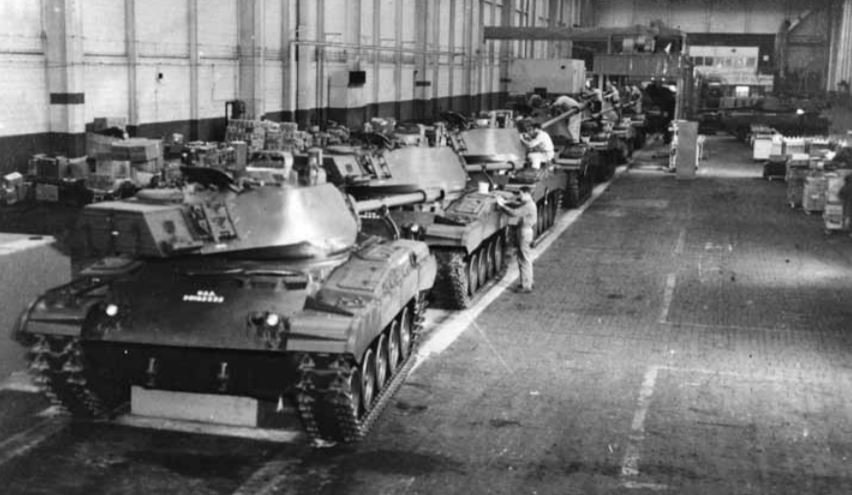
M41s on the assembly line at the Cleveland Tank Plant, the Cadillac factory where they were manufactured from 1951 to 1954.

The hull of the M41 is of welded steel construction, with the driving compartment located at the front of the tank and to the left. This may be accessed through the hull by a single piece hatch cover opening to the right. When the hatch is closed, the tank is navigated by three driving periscopes mounted forward of the driver's position and one to the left. There is no night vision equipment fitted as standard, although in some models an infrared searchlight could be mounted externally on the turret or the day periscopes replaced with new infrared periscopes. An emergency escape hatch is situated beneath the driver's seat. The engine compartment is located towards the rear of the hull and is insulated from the crew by a fireproof bulkhead. The Allison Cross-Drive Model CD-500-3 transmission is located within this compartment, immediately behind the engine, and includes two forward and one reverse gear ratios. All M41 tanks utilize a torsion bar suspension, which supports five road wheels with the drive sprocket at the rear and idler towards the front, and three track return rollers. The first, second, and fifth road wheel stations have hydraulic shock absorbers. Although the M41 is not considered amphibious, it was designed for fording up to 1.016 meters of water without preparation, and up to 2.44 meters of water with preparation. The hull is fitted with electric bilge pumps accordingly.

Standard M41 turrets are of cast and welded steel construction and fitted with a turret basket. The crew commander and gunner are seated to the right and a loader seated to the left. Turret rotation is assisted by hydraulic/electrical drives and takes approximately ten seconds to traverse a full 360°. Crew commanders have a day periscope and a turret cupola with five vision blocks for observation; this is also provided with a hinged hatch cover opening forwards. Both the loader and gunner are also provided with periscopes. In some models, there is an additional stowage basket welded to the rear of the turret, and a dome-shaped ventilator on the turret roof.

The M41 has a very distinctive, well sloped glacis plate with a horizontal top, and may also be readily identified by its large exhaust pipes on each side of the upper hull rear. Both turret sides are vertical and slightly sloped. Other identifying features on the turret include the bustle and stowage box at the rear, the commander's cupola to the right, and the muzzle brake with fume extractor on the main armament.

=== Armament and ammunition ===
The M41A1, M41A2, and M41A3 were equipped with a 76 mm M32A1 high velocity rifled cannon firing fixed high explosive (HE), armor piercing (AP), or high velocity armor piercing (HVAP) ammunition. The baseline M41 was equipped with a very similar 76 mm M32/T91E3 cannon. In all four marks, a co-axial .30 caliber machine gun is mounted to the left of the main armament; additionally, in US service an external .50 caliber machine gun was also mounted to the turret roof. The 76 mm cannon has a maximum elevation of +19.75° and a depression of −9.75°. It utilizes a vertical sliding breech block and a spring actuated, inertia percussion firing mechanism. To prevent overpressure and help absorb recoil, the cannon has also been fitted with a bore evacuator, a blast deflector, and a concentric hydrospring recoil system. Ranging is manual and conducted through the gunner's M97A1 telescopic sight. Maximum range of the M32/T91E3 and M32A1 is estimated at 4,752 meters.

M32A1 and M32/T91E3 ammunition
Type	Model	Weight, kg (projectile)	Muzzle velocity, m/s
AP-T	M339	Unknown	975
HVAP-T	M319	16.78	1,260
HE	M352	19.05	731
WP-SMK	M361	19.05	731
HVAP-DS-T	M331	Unknown	1,257

In 1982, the AAI Corporation announced that it had developed a 76 mm APFSDS shell for the M32A1 and M32/T91E3, which greatly increased the M41 tank's lethality. Both Denmark and the Republic of China (Taiwan) purchased an undisclosed amount of the new ammunition.

== Variants ==
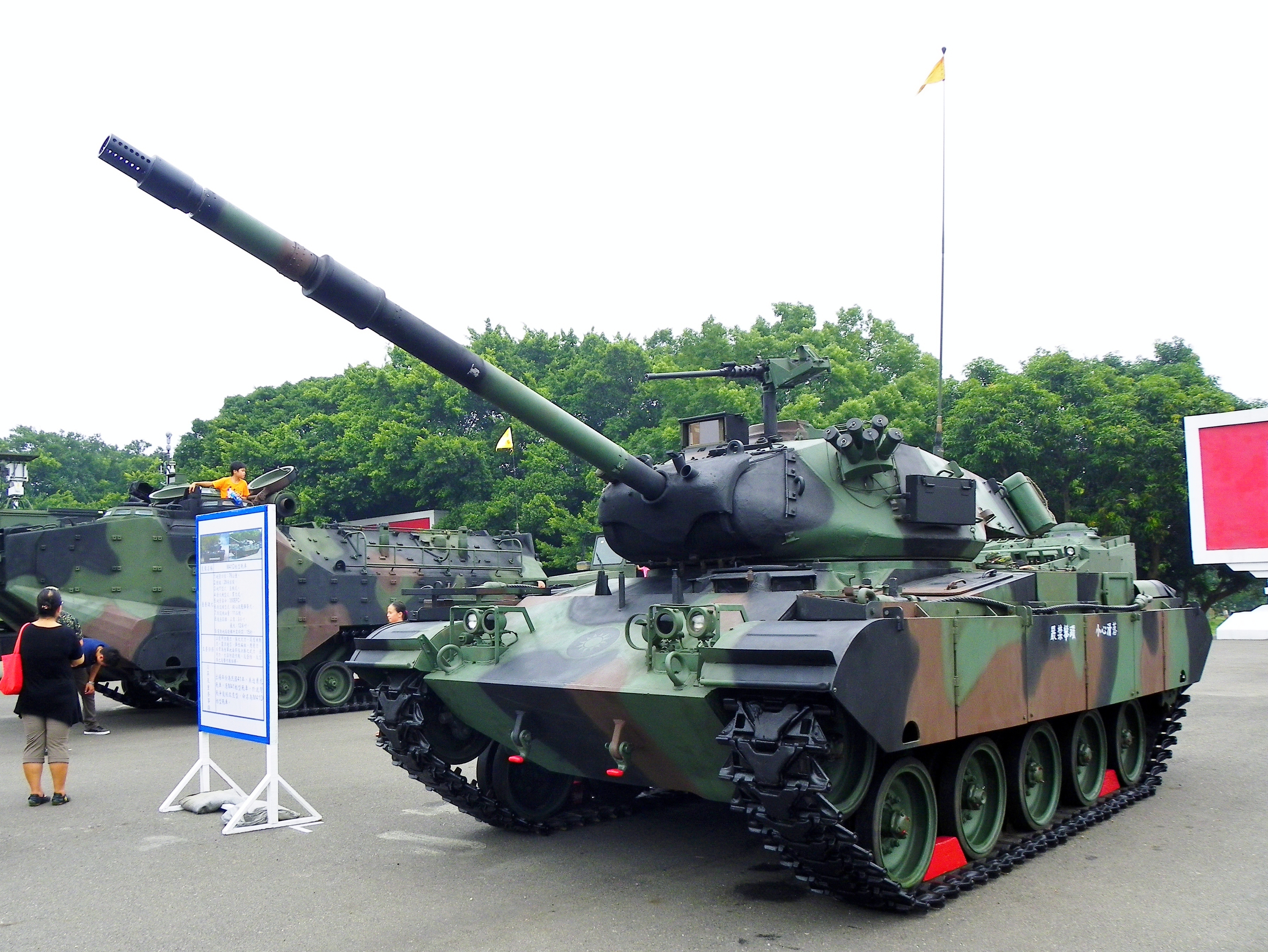
M41D of the Republic of China Army.

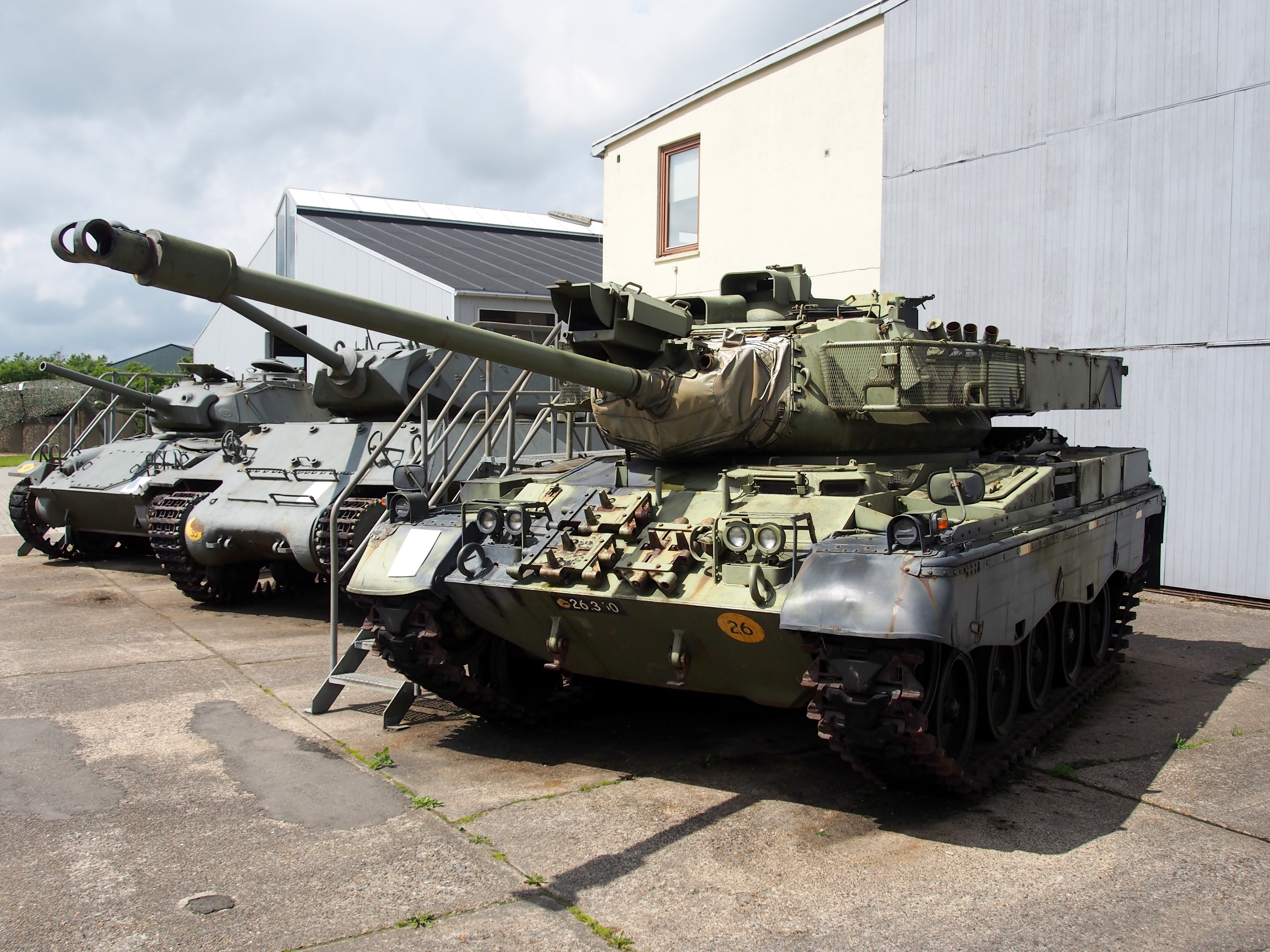
M41 DK-1 of the Royal Danish Army.

- M41: Standard production model from 1951 to 1952. Armed with an M32/T91E3 76 mm rifled gun on an M76/T138E1 mount and carried fifty-seven rounds of 76 mm ammunition. Turret traverse was conducted through a pulsing relay system and electrical drives, and the tank was powered by an AOS-895-3 petrol engine.
- M41A1: Replaced the base M41 as the standard production model. Received the improved hydraulic turret traverse system with manual backup in 1953. Armed with an M32A1 76 mm rifled gun on an M76A1 mount. Carried sixty-five rounds of 76 mm ammunition.
- M41A2: An improved variant of the M41A1 incorporated in 1956 with a fuel-injected Continental 6-cylinder gas engine, A much less fuel hungry AOS-895-5 fuel injection engine, dual power traverse for the tank commander, and a pinion-type gun elevation gear.
- M41A3: Upgraded M41A1 tanks with fuel injection engines.
- QM41: United States Navy model, fitted with a remote-control mechanism and employed for ordnance testing purposes.
- M41 105: An M41 hull retrofitted with the complete turret and 105 mm gun of the Stingray light tank. This prototype was trialed by Cadillac Gage as a potential market upgrade for preexisting M41 tanks but was not adopted by any country.
- M41B: M41 modernized by Bernardini S/A Industria e Comercio for the Brazilian Army. Fitted with a new Saab-Scania DS-14A 04 eight-cylinder diesel engine developing 405 hp (302 kW), enabling the tank to reach speeds of up to 70 km/h (45 mph). A new cooling system was also installed, consisting of a radiator and two large fans. The size of this apparatus required the construction of an entirely new rear hull. The 76 mm gun has been bored out to 90 mm caliber, shortened, and fitted with a counterbalance on the barrel and a torsion bar compensator at the breech; this heavily modified M32 is known as the Ca 76/90 M32 BR2.
- M41C: M41B rebuilt to the specifications of the Brazilian Marine Corps, including a different DS-12 OA diesel engine and a laser rangefinder.
- M41D: M41 modified by the Republic of China Army with a new Detroit Diesel 8V-71T diesel engine developing 350 hp (260 kW), enabling the tank to reach speeds of up to 72 km/h (45 mph) and increasing its range to 450 km (280 mi). The turret was altered to carry a Taiwanese-manufactured variant of the M32 known as the M32K1, as well as a co-axial Type 74 (FN MAG) general purpose machine gun. The M32K1 has a fume extractor and a different muzzle brake, and has been upgraded with thermal imaging sights.
- M41 DK-1: M41 modified by the Royal Danish Army with an NBC protection system, an external laser rangefinder, and thermal imaging equipment.
- M41E: M41 modified by the Spanish Army with a new General Motors 8V-71T diesel engine developing 400 hp (300 kW); this increases the tank's range to about 483 km (300 mi).
- M41GTI: M41 modernized by German company GLS for the Royal Thai Army. Fitted with a new MTU MB 833 Aa501 diesel engine developing 442 hp (330 kW), enabling the tank to reach speeds of up to 60 km/h (35 mph) and increasing its range to 600 km (370 mi). The 76 mm gun was also coupled to the MOLF 41 digital fire control system with thermal imaging sights and a laser rangefinder, as well as a new co-axial Heckler & Koch HK21 machine gun.
- M41 HAKO: Turretless M41 modified by the Spanish Army to carry a bank of HOT anti-tank guided missiles.
- M41U: M41A1 with improved armor and a turret altered to carry the Belgian-designed 90 mm Cockerill Mk. IV gun as well as a co-axial FN MAG general purpose machine gun. Developed by Belgium for the Uruguayan Army.
- T49: An experimental tank made as an improvement for the M41 Bulldog in 1954, featuring the 90mm gun T132 and a stereoscopic rangefinder. Only two were built. The tank later served as a test bed for the XM551 Sheridan and was mounted with a rounded turret and a 152mm cannon.
- Type 65: A M41 designed by the Republic of China Army, similar to the M-41D but with significantly thicker armor and a co-axial M60 machine gun. It is unclear whether the Type 65 is an M41 derivative built under license in the Republic of China, or simply a rebuilt M41A2/M41A3. Unlike the M41 series the Type 65's turret is entirely cast steel, and its interior dimensions are smaller.
- NIMDA M41: A modernization upgrade package for the M41 offered by NIMDA ltd which included a new FCS-53 system, a laser range finder, a 2-plane stabilizer and a fully overhauled powerpack, with the key upgrade being the addition of the new 8V-71T engine.

	T37	T41	M41 & M41A1	M41A2 & M41A3	T49
Length	292.1 in (7.4 m)	317.1 in (8.1 m)	318.6 in (8.1 m) (early muzzle brake); 319.8 in (8.1 m) (later muzzle brake)	319.8 in (8.1 m)	313.0 in (8.0 m)
Width	127 in (3.2 m)		125.9 in (3.2 m)		128.9 in (3.3 m)
Height	102 in (2.6 m) (over cupola)	108 in (2.7 m)	118.8 in (3.0 m)		127.3 in (3.2 m) (over MG)
Ground clearance	17.5 in (44.5 cm)				
Top speed	41 mph (66 km/h)		45 mph (72 km/h)		
Fording	44 in (1.1 m)	45 in (1.1 m)	48 in (1.2 m)		
Max grade	60 percent				
Max trench	8 ft (2.4 m)	5 ft (1.5 m)	8 ft (2.4 m)		6 ft (1.8 m)
Max wall	26 in (0.7 m)		28 in (0.7 m)		
Range	150 mi (240 km)		110 mi (180 km)	110 mi (180 km) (280 mi (450 km) w/ jettison fuel tanks)	100 mi (160 km)
Power	500 hp (370 kW) at 2800 rpm				
Power-to-weight ratio	20.7 hp/ST (17.0 kW/t)	19.4 hp/ST (15.9 kW/t)	19.5 hp/ST (16.0 kW/t) (M41); 19.3 hp/ST (15.9 kW/t) (M41A1)	20.5 hp/ST (16.9 kW/t) (M41A2); 20.3 hp/ST (16.7 kW/t) (M41A3)	18.8 hp/ST (15.5 kW/t)
Torque	945 lb⋅ft (1,280 N⋅m) at 2400 rpm		960 lb⋅ft (1,300 N⋅m) at 2400 rpm		
Weight, combat loaded	48,280 lb (21,900 kg)	51,600 lb (23,410 kg)	51,200 lb (23,220 kg) (M41); 51,800 lb (23,500 kg) (M41A1)	51,200 lb (23,220 kg) (M41A2); 51,800 lb (23,500 kg) (M41A3)	53,200 lb (24,130 kg)
Ground pressure	9.4 psi (65 kPa)	10.1 psi (70 kPa)	9.6 psi (66 kPa) (M41); 9.7 psi (67 kPa) (M41A1)	9.6 psi (66 kPa) (M41A2); 9.7 psi (67 kPa) (M41A3)	10.0 psi (69 kPa)
Main armament	T94 76 mm	T91 76 mm	M32 76 mm		T132E3 90 mm
Elevation	+20° / -9°		+20° / -10°		+19.5° / -9.5°
Traverse rate	12 seconds/360°	11 seconds/360°	10 seconds/360°		13 seconds/360°
Elevation rate	6°/second		4°/second		
Main gun ammo	60 rounds	46 rounds	57 rounds		
Firing rate	12 rounds per minute				10 rounds per minute

== Operators ==
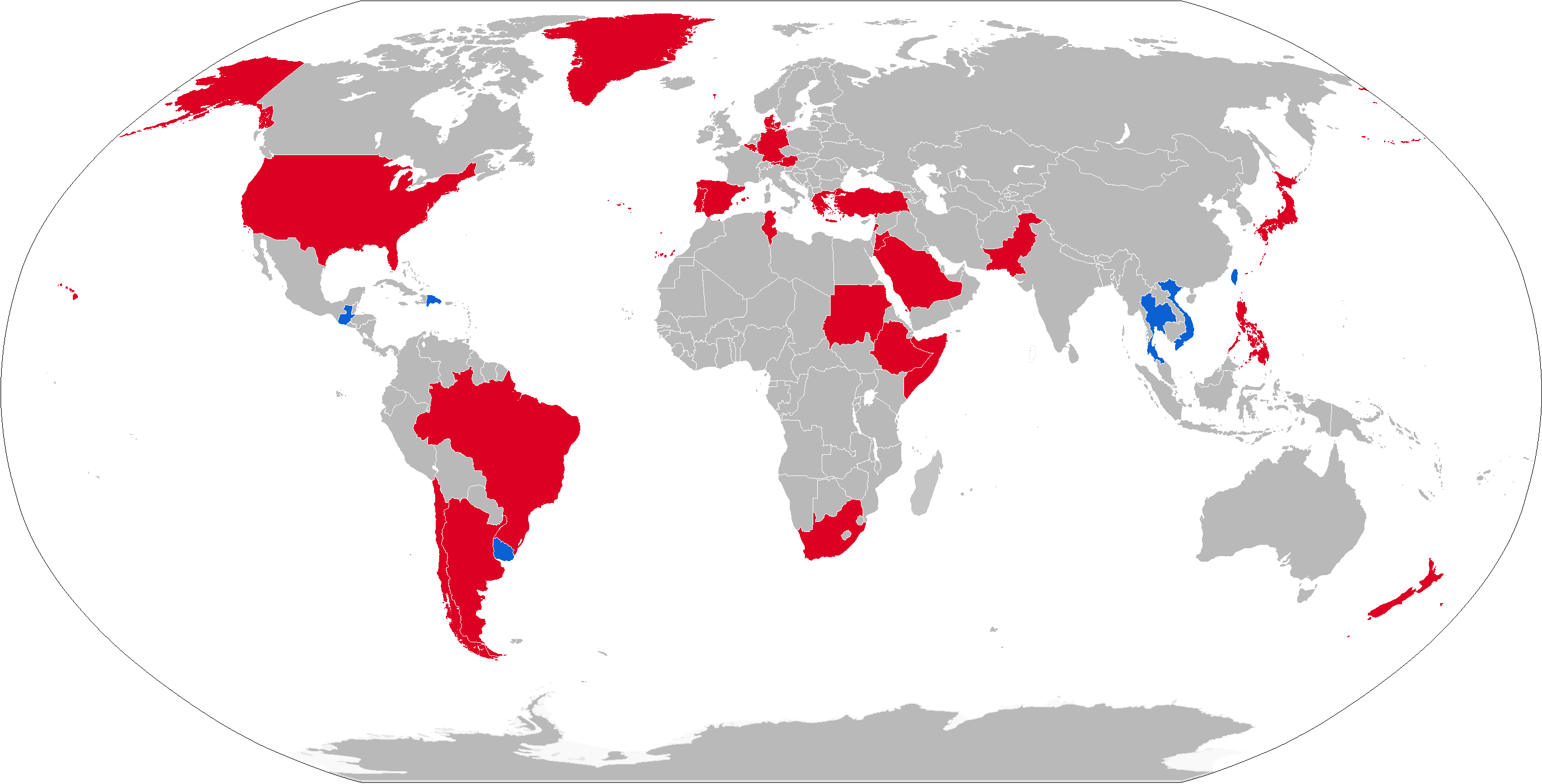
Operators Current Former

=== Current ===
- Republic of China (Taiwan): M41A3 used until 2022. Small numbers of M41D remain in service as of 2024.
- Dominican Republic: 12 M41B as of 2024.
- Thailand: 24 as of 2024.
- Uruguay: 22 M41A1UR and 25 M41C as of 2024.

=== Former ===
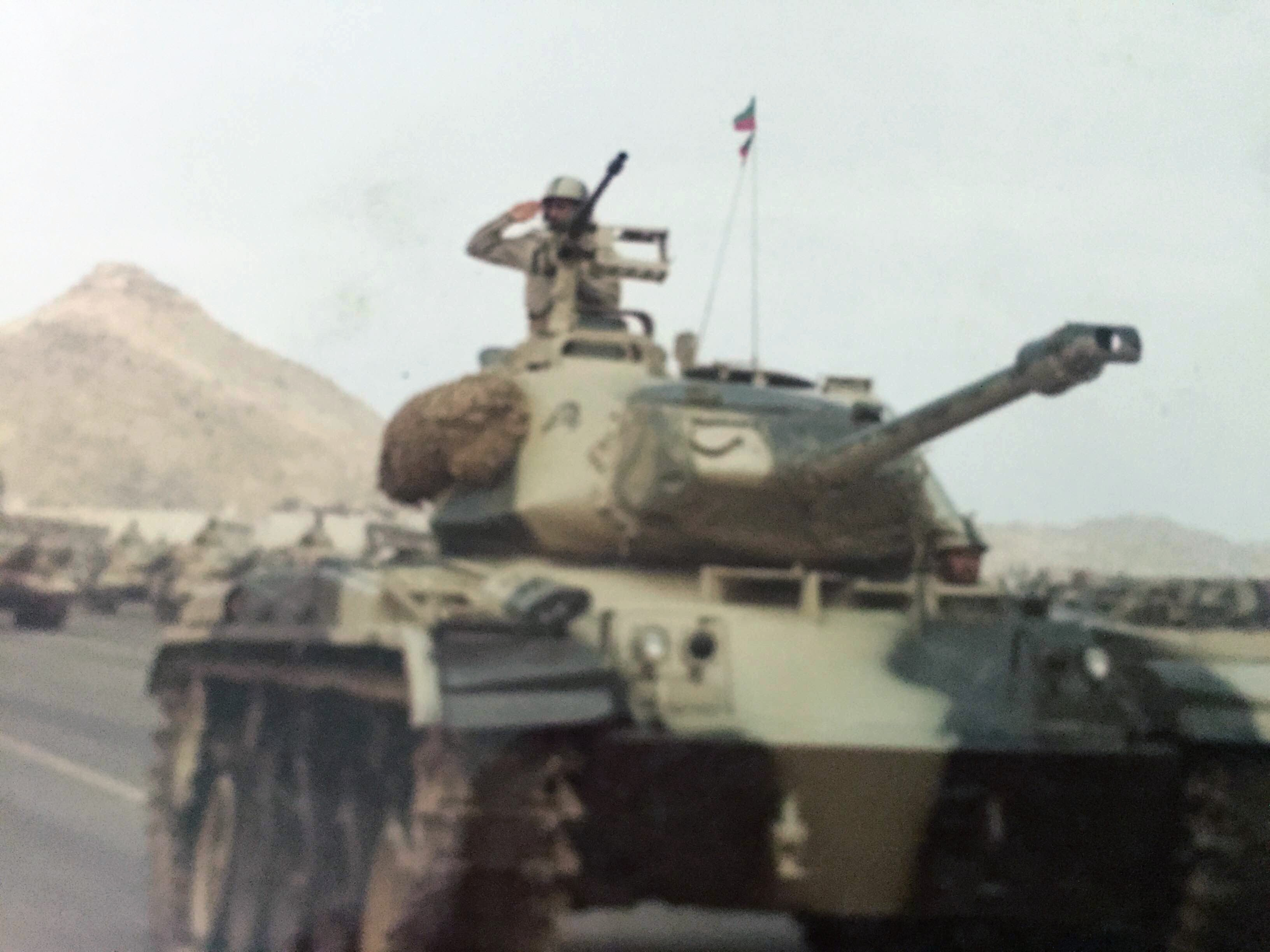
A Saudi Arabian Army M41 Walker Bulldog on maneuvers.

- Austria: 40
- Belgium: 135
- Brazil: 386
- Chile: 60, replaced by Leopard 1V MBT.
- Denmark: 53
- Ethiopian Empire: 54
- West Germany: 50
- Greece: 81
- Guatemala: 10
- Japan: 130
- Lebanon: 18 in service with the Lebanese Army (1958–1984).
- New Zealand: 10
- Pakistan: 50
- Philippines: 7
- Portugal
- Saudi Arabia: 60
- Somalia: 10
- South Africa: 1 confirmed, presumably for evaluation purposes. Other sources claimed anywhere from 90 to 100 in service; this resulted in significant controversy in the late 1970s.
- South Vietnam: 350
- Spain: 245
- Sudan: 53; donated by Saudi Arabia in 1981.
- Tunisia: 12
- Turkey: 100
- United States
- Vietnam: Captured or inherited from South Vietnam, largely in reserve storage as of 2020

=== Former non-state ===
- Army of Free Lebanon: Seized from Lebanese Army stocks.
- Brigade 2506: 5; all destroyed or captured during the Bay of Pigs Invasion.
- (Eritrea) Eritrean Liberation Front: Captured from Ethiopia.
- Kataeb Regulatory Forces: Seized from Lebanese Army stocks
- Tigers Militia: Seized from Lebanese Army stocks.
- Lebanese Arab Army: Seized from Lebanese Army stocks.
- People's Liberation Army (Lebanon): Seized from Lebanese Army stocks.

== See also ==
- List of "M" series military vehicles
- Type 64 (tank)

=== Vehicles of comparable role, performance, and era ===
- SK-105 Kürassier – (Austria)
- Type 63 (light tank) – (China)
- Type 62 – (China)
