= Bernardini (company) =

The Bernardini S/A Industria e Comercio (Bernardini Industrial and Commerce Company), of São Paulo, Brazil, was a safe manufacturer which operated from 1912 to 1992. During its later years it branched out into vehicle production.

== Products ==
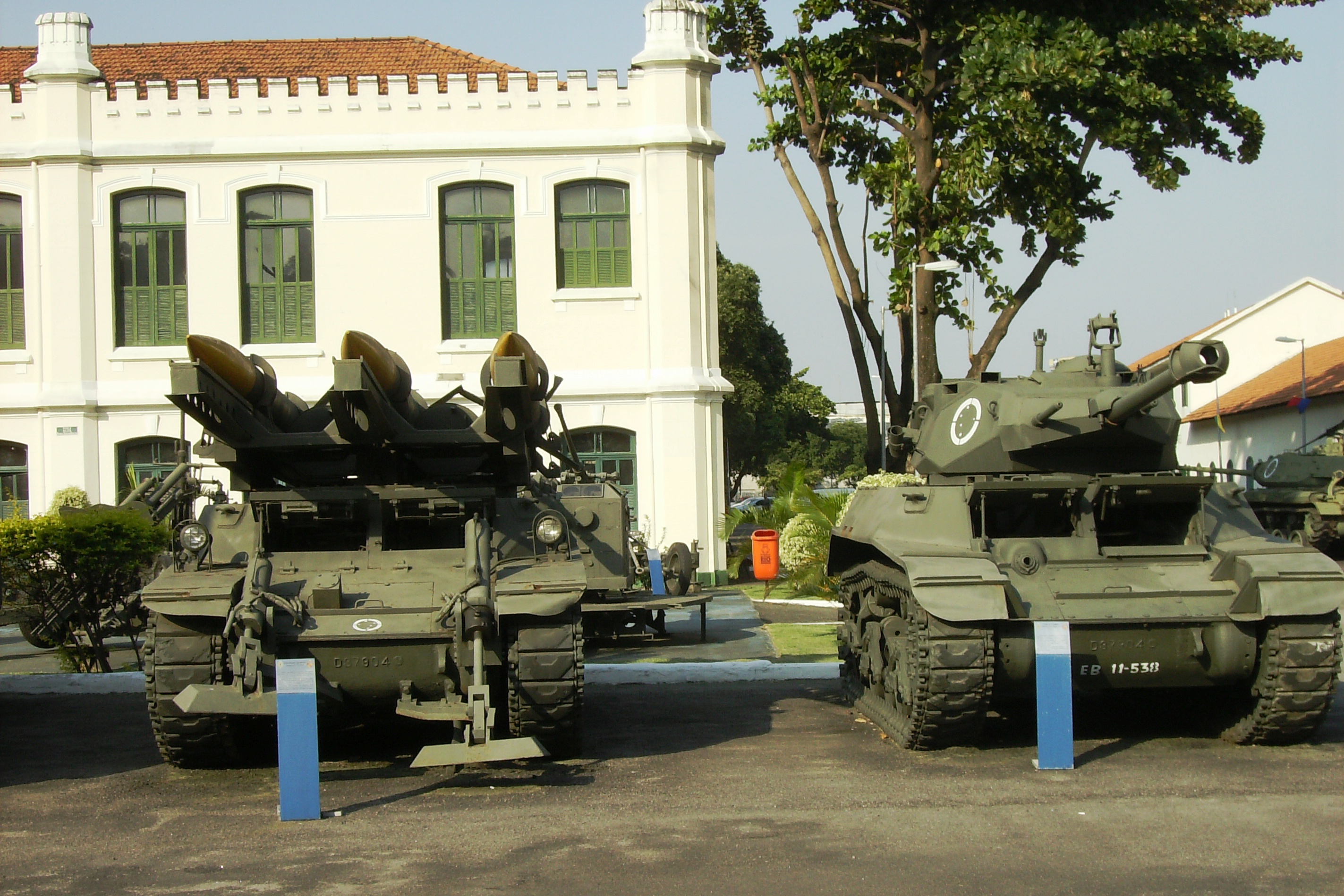
XLF missile launcher (left) and X1A1 tank (right)

- Bernardini X1A1 Light Tank and X1 based XLF missile launcher
- Bernardini MB-3 Tamoyo tank
- Bernardini Xingu BT25 and BT50 (4 x 4) light vehicles (Brazil), Jeep like vehicles based closely on the Toyota Bandeirante
