= Iveco LMV =

Italian infantry mobility vehicle

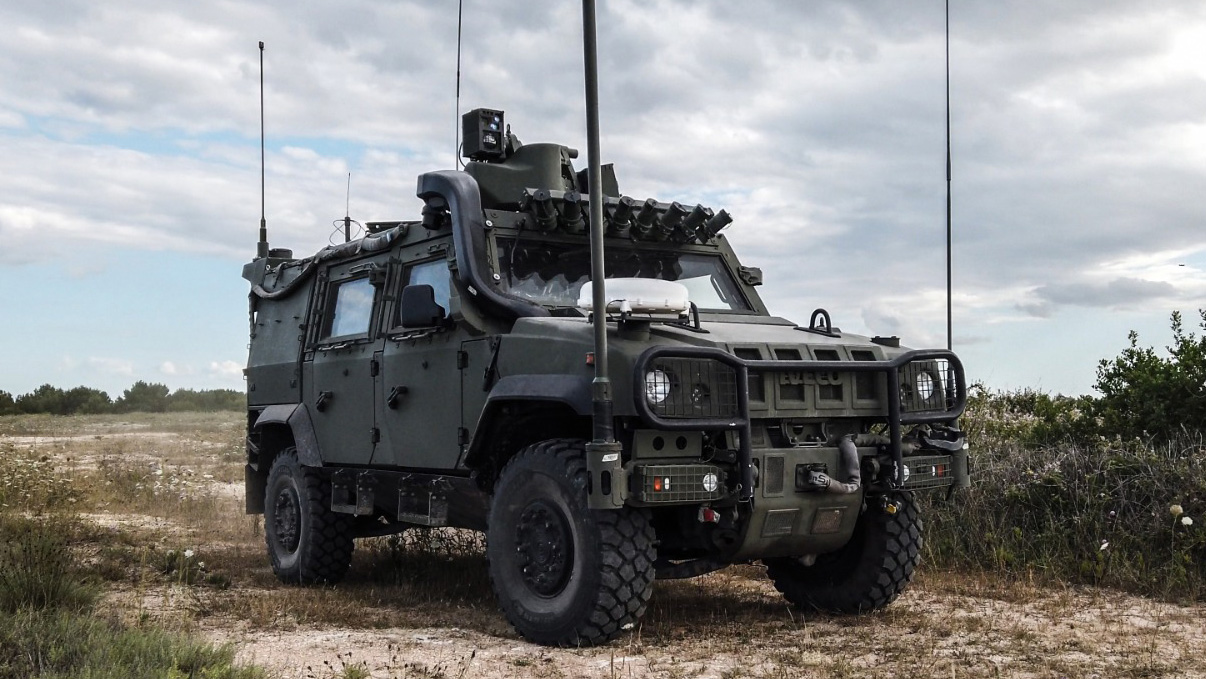
- VTLM2-NEC in 2020
- Type: Infantry mobility vehicle with MRAP capabilities
- Place of origin: Italy

Service history
- Wars: War in Afghanistan; Syrian Civil War; Russo-Ukrainian War; Russo-Ukrainian war

Production history
- Designed: 1990s
- Manufacturer: Iveco Defence Vehicles; BAE Systems (UK only); MVPS (Russia only)
- Unit cost: €405,000
- Produced: 2001–present
- No. built: 10,000+

Specifications
- Mass: 7.1T (LMV-Standard Cab); 7.5t (LMV-Standard Cab); 7.1t (LMV-Short Cab); 7.5t (LMV-Short Cab); 7.1t (LMV-Medevac); 8.5t (LMV2-Crew Cab); 7.1t (LMV2-Chassis Cab); 7.75t (LMV2-Chassis Cab); 7.1t (LMV2-Medevac)
- Length: Depending on the version
- Width: 2,200 mm (7 ft 2.6 in)
- Height: 2,050 mm (6 ft 8.7 in) (LMV Crewcab); 2,172 mm (7 ft 1.5 in) (LMV2 Crewcab)
- Crew: 1+4; 1+3 (Panther); 1+6 (Stretched Variant)
- Armor: AMAP for STANAG 4569 Level 1-3
- Main armament: Pintle mounted weapon; Remote controlled weapon station
- Engine: FPT F1C (3.0L Inline 4): 142 kW (190 hp) (LMV); 162 kW (217 hp) (LMV2)
- Payload capacity: 800 kg (1,800 lb) (LMV Crewcab); 1,500 kg (3,300 lb) (LMV2 Crewcab)
- Transmission: 6 speed fully-automatic (LMV); 8 speed fully-automatic (LMV2)
- Suspension: Independent, Double A-Arm
- Ground clearance: 473 mm (18.6 in)
- Operational range: 500 km (310 mi)+
- Maximum speed: > 130 km/h (81 mph)

The Iveco LMV (Light Multirole Vehicle) is a 4WD tactical vehicle developed by Iveco. After its adoption by the Italian Army as the Veicolo-Tattico-Leggero-Multiruolo (VTLM) Lince ("Light tactical multirole vehicle Lynx"), it won the Future Command and Liaison Vehicle (FCLV) competition of the British Army as the Panther, but the fleet was put up for sale in 2018.

It has been adopted by the armies of Albania, Austria, Belgium, Brazil, Norway, Russia and Spain. The Italian Army took vehicles to Afghanistan for ISAF and Lebanon for the UN Interim Force. In Afghanistan, Lince vehicles have saved passengers' lives in several attacks with IEDs.

== Design ==
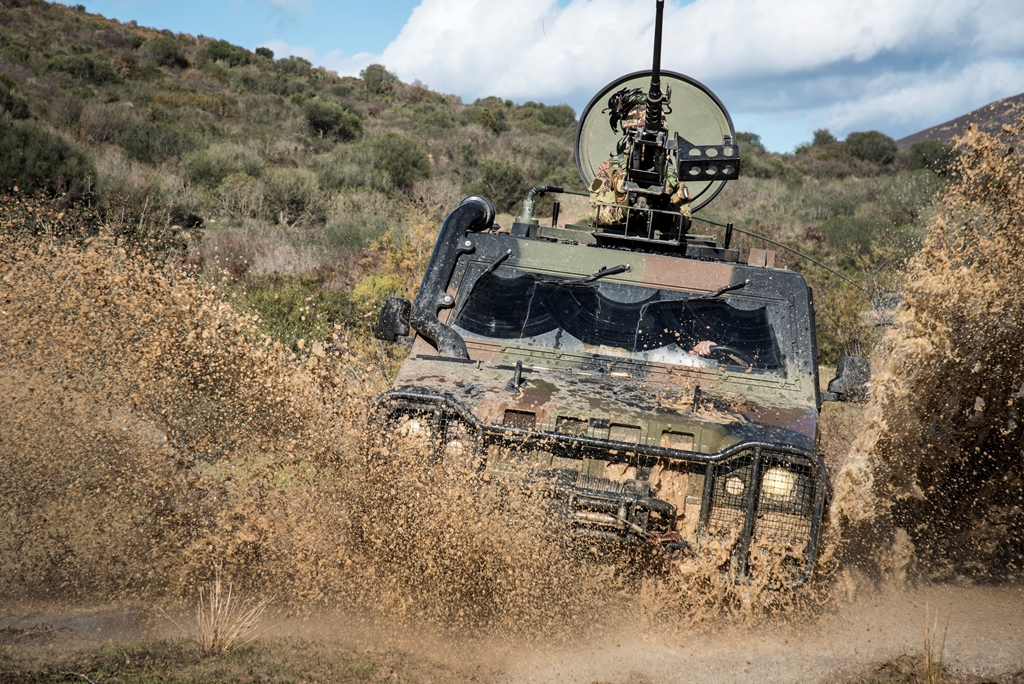
Italian Army 3rd Bersaglieri Regiment VTLM Lince

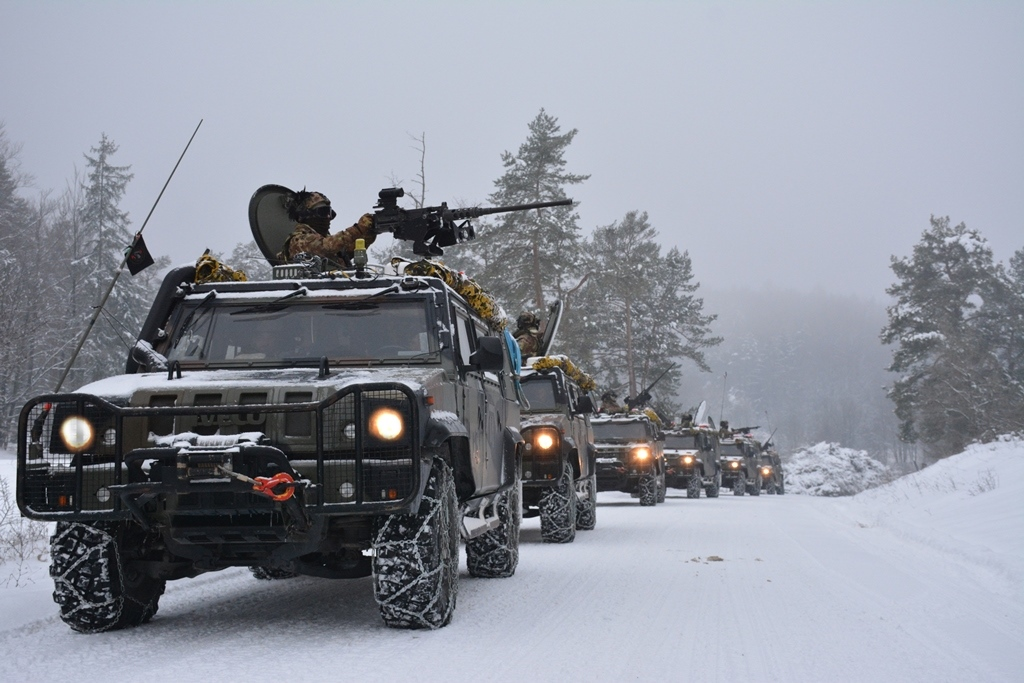
Bersaglieri Brigade "Garibaldi" during exercise Allied Spirit IV at the Hohenfels Training Area

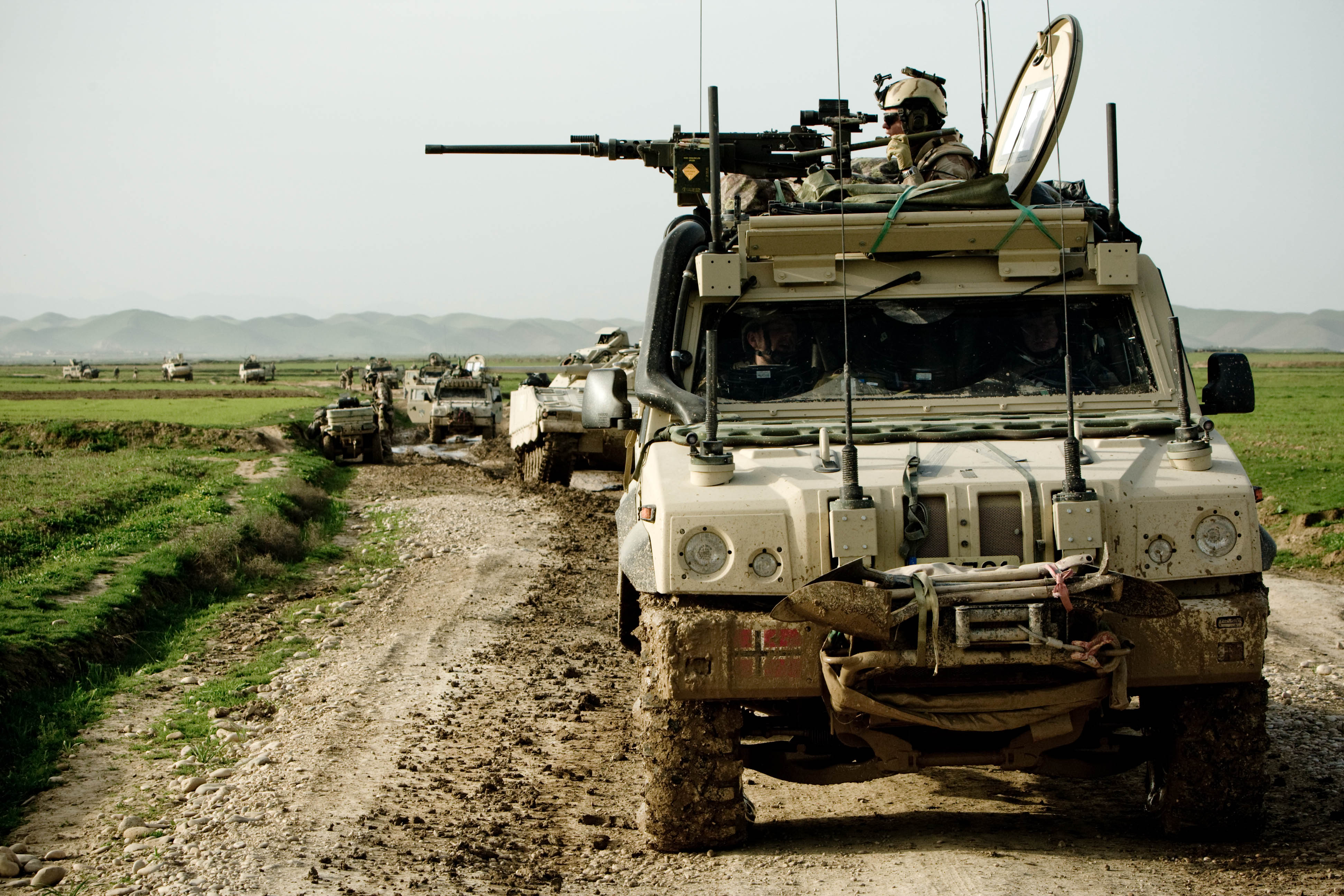
Norwegian Iveco LMV.

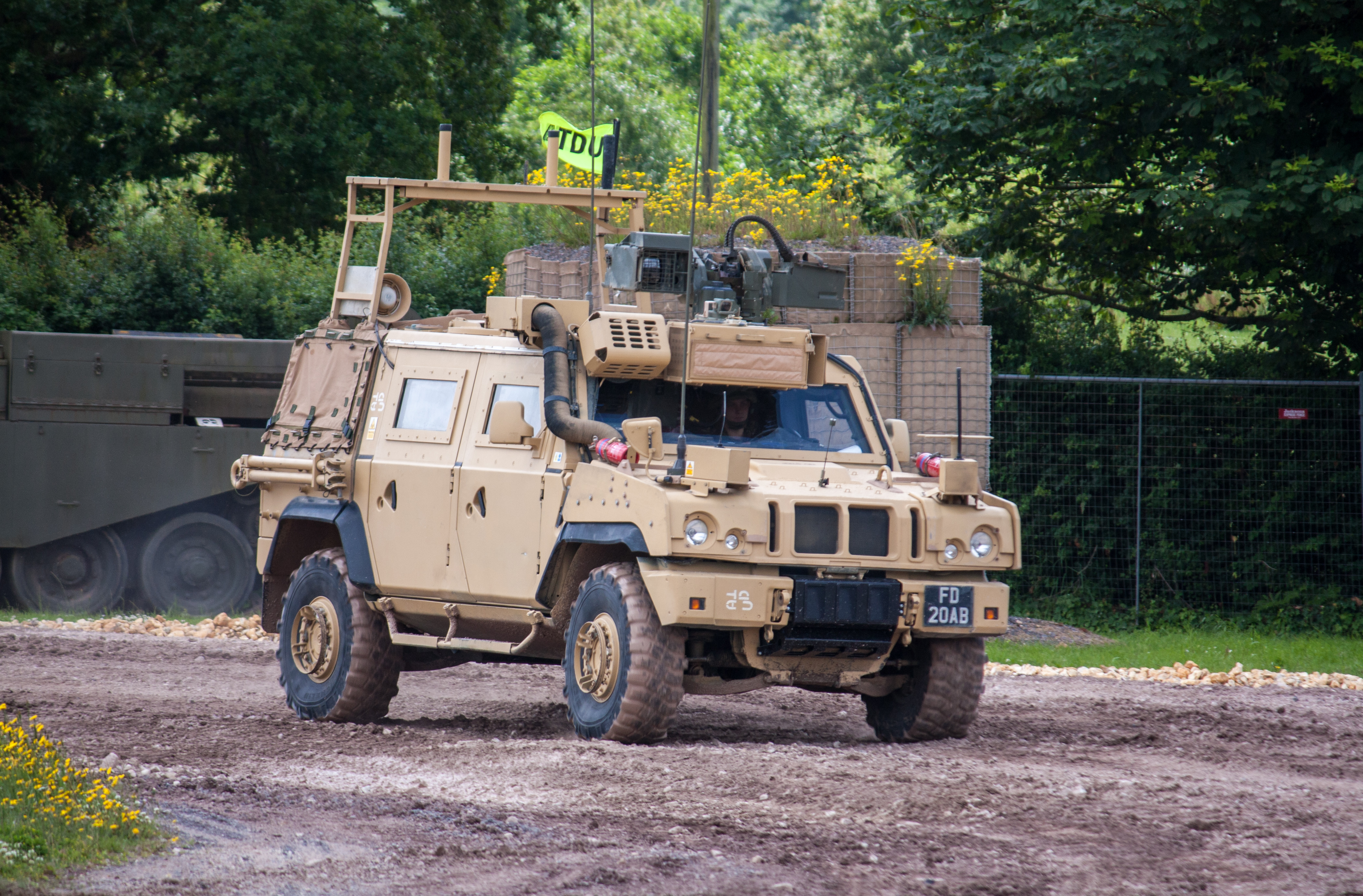
Panther CLV.

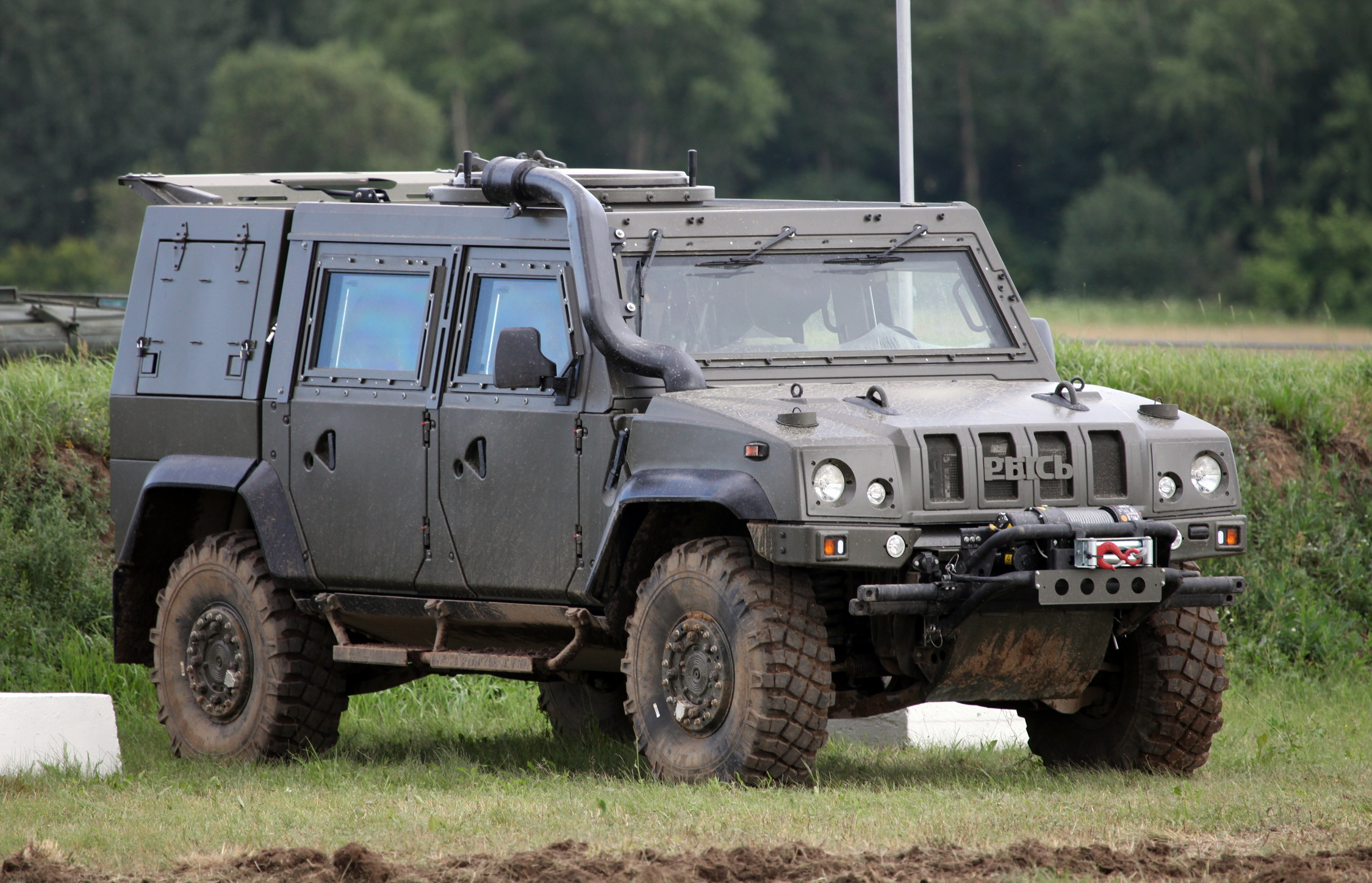
Russian Iveco LMV Rys'.

The LMV uses modular armour packs to adjust its level of protection to its mission requirements. In regards to mine protection, the vehicle's ground clearance has been increased to 493 mm (19.4 in) without increasing the overall height (which is less than 2 metres or 6.6 feet); it also uses suspended seats of aeronautical derivation, v-hull under body, and a collapsible sandwich structure in the floor to deflect and absorb mine blasts. Its exhaust is piped through its C-pillars, and its turbocharger is located underneath the engine to reduce its thermal signature. Good mobility is achieved thanks to a run-flat system, allowing the vehicle to move even with completely deflated tires. It is related to the Fiat Oltre concept car unveiled in 2005.

The LMV was designed in the 1990s and the first LMVs were produced in 2001 while the UK's Panthers were produced between 2006 and 2009.

== Variants ==
=== British Panther CLV ===
The Panther Command and Liaison Vehicle or Panther CLV is the British Army variant of the Iveco LMV. In common with many British army vehicle procurement programmes from the 1990s onwards, the Panther CLV's specification has its origins in the cancelled FFLAV project. In the aftermath of the Gulf War the programme was split into four parts, with the programme that led to the Panther CLV being named Future Command and Liaison Vehicle (FCLV). Alvis offered both their own Scarab and the Iveco LMV under license. The LMV was chosen over the Vickers RG-32 Scout, RG-31 Nyala and the INSYS offer of a licensed ACMAT VRBL. Before the announcement of the winning contract Alvis and Vickers merged to form Alvis Vickers, which was in turn merged with BAE Systems to form BAE Systems Land Systems, who took over the contract.

Design modifications were made by BAE to allow assembly at BAE Systems Land Systems' factory in Newcastle upon Tyne; over 300 Panthers were assembled there under a £160 million contract. It was intended that the Panther would replace multiple vehicles including Combat Vehicle Reconnaissance (tracked) family, FV432, Saxon and Land Rover Truck Utility Medium (TUM).

The Panther seated four people. They were equipped with Enforcer RCWS weapons stations which were developed by SELEX Galileo. These weapons station could be armed with a 7.62 mm general purpose machine gun, a 12.7 mm heavy machine gun or a 40mm automatic grenade launcher. The Panther was reduced to a three-seat vehicle when a large amount of communication equipment was placed in the right rear seat. This reduced its utility, because it was classed as an armoured vehicle, the commander and driver were always required to stay in the vehicle.

IVECO also attempted to secure an order for more Panthers under the Operational Utility Vehicle System (OUVS) programme, an attempt to replace a varied selection of utility vehicles in British service. The offer was added to the shortlist decided in 2008-09, but the programme was cancelled owing to lessons learnt in the War in Afghanistan.

The first Panthers were delivered to the 1st Mechanised Brigade and a small number underwent hot weather trials in Afghanistan.. The first British combat deployment was made as part of Operation Herrick in 2009, with 67 vehicles upgraded with additional electronic countermeasures, reversing cameras, new roof hatches and a new engine air intake. Additional armour increased the protection level from STANAG Level 1 to Level 3. These vehicles also carried an additional crew member, which was made possible by relocation of some of the BOWMAN radio equipment. This variant was known as the Panther PCV (Protected Command Vehicle), with the upgrades costing around £300,000 per vehicle. On withdrawal from Afghanistan these vehicles remained in service but with their theatre-specific ECM systems removed.

At end of April 2018, the UK Defence Equipment Sales Authority put the entire Panther 4x4 fleet up for sale with 395 vehicles available. The (CVRT) family, FV432, and Land Rover Truck Utility Medium (TUM) remain in service.

In May 2018 it was reported by Jane's that the British Army was intending to dispose of its Panther CLV fleet, however as of 2024 this has not yet taken place, with Panther CLV being deployed on exercises in Estonia. Others reported in 2023 that the Panther was expected to remain in service until at least 2037.

=== Russian Rys LMV ===
The Rys is the Russian variant of the Iveco LMV, manufactured by MVPS, an Iveco Russia and Oboronservis LLC joint venture company, with complete knockdown assembly on the premises of the 127th Wheeled Vehicle Repair Plant in Voronezh. The Rys' supply chain is from different plants around Russia.

=== Other variants ===
The LMV is available in two different wheelbases, 3.2 m (126.0 in) and 3.5 m (137.8 in). A two-door, two seater is also available.

Since 2015, LMV production has featured a host of improvements: these include a more powerful 220 horsepower (164 kW; 223 PS) diesel engine coupled to a new eight-speed automatic transmission, an upgraded drive line for higher performance and a new air filtration system. The payload of the LMV has been increased by some 40% and it is now fitted with new specially designed suspension units and recently developed all-terrain tyres for a higher level of cross-country mobility. A key feature of the latest LMV batch of improvements is that they can be backfitted to the entire legacy LMV fleet to enhance their capabilities. The internal layout of the LMV has also been redesigned for greater crew comfort, with new seats, a next-generation dashboard and an upgraded hardtop. The internal cab height has been increased by 100 mm (3.9 in) to create more internal volume and an electronic architecture has been fitted for easier upgrading in the future.

== Success ==
As of September 2015, Iveco Defence Vehicles had achieved sales of more than 4,000 LMVs Lince 4X4. Iveco LMV was authorized by the Italian government to sell to Ukraine for 41 million euros on 14 September 2014, but never confirmed delivery.

== Operators ==
=== Current ===
Albania

- Albanian Land Force:
  - 23 ordered in Iveco LMV in 2015, 2 more donated in 2017.
  - Order of Iveco LMV2 ordered in August 2025.

Austria

- Austrian Army operates 150 Iveco LMV
  - 123 GMF Husar and Husar MP (infantry mobility vehicle)
  - 3 GMF Husar PsyOps
  - 22 BAA-EO GMF Husar. (12 for reconnaissance companies, 6 for artillery observation, 4 for the Jagdkommando)
  - 3 GMF Husar Beagle (equipped with a ground surveillance radar).

Belgium

- Belgian Army:
  - 440 Iveco LMV purchased with 120 add-on armour kits, and had an option for 180 additional LMV that was never activated. The vehicle will be replaced by the JLTV.
  - 80 donated to Ukraine (announcement in January 2023).
  - 300 pledged to Ukraine in March 2024.

Bosnia and Herzegovina

- State Investigation and Protection Agency

Brazil

- Brazilian Army operates 48 LMV Lince and LMV-BR as of 2024.
- 420 units of the LMV-BR2 variant ordered in July 2024, with national production and deliveries planned to start in 2026. 105 LMV-BR2s will be armed with the REMAX IV remote weapon system. The remaining 315 vehicles are slated to receive the REMAN manned weapon station. 1 LMV-BR2 delivered.

Croatia

- Croatian Army operates 14 Iveco LMV

Czech Republic

- Czech Army bought 120 Iveco LMV and ordered 80 for CBRN reconnaissance.

Indonesia

- Indonesian Army

Italy

- Italian Army received most units from about 2,000 Iveco LMV in March 2013; 3,850 total planned to 2034
- Italian Air Force
- Italian Navy
- Carabinieri
- Guardia di Finanza
- Italian Red Cross
- Italian Civil Defence

Lebanon

- Internal Security Forces bought 25 Iveco LMV in 2014 and 20 Iveco LBTP in 2015, more donated in late 2021.

Norway

- Norwegian Army 170 Iveco LMV on order, last delivery of 62 units in February 2018
  - 14 donated to Ukraine in September 2022.

Qatar

- Qatar Armed Forces

Russia

- Russian Army received 67 Iveco LMV Rys' delivered in 2012. Additional 358 were locally assembled between 2013 and 2014.

Slovakia

- The Slovak Armed Forces bought 10 Iveco M65E 4x4 LMV for Special Forces.

Spain

- Spanish Army — 395 Iveco LMV in March 2013

Ba'athist Syria

- Syrian Arab Army used to operate Rys' variant supplied by Russia in 2017.

Somaliland

- Somaliland National Army: Operates between 2 and 3 LMVs donated by Taiwan in 2022.

Tunisia

- Tunisian Army
- Tunisian National Guard

Turkmenistan

- Ministry for National Security

Ukraine

- Ukrainian Ground Forces
  - 380 from Belgium.
  - 14 donated by Norway in September 2022.

United Kingdom

- British Army
  - Royal Tank Regiment: 19 vehicles

== See also ==
- Iveco MTV, future infantry mobility vehicle for the Dutch Armed Forces

Comparable modern 4x4 infantry mobility vehicle

- URO VAMTAC – (Spain)
- Sisu GTP – (Finland)
- AMZ Tur – (Poland)
- Hawkei – (Australia)
- JLTV – (United States)
