= VBTP-MR Guarani =

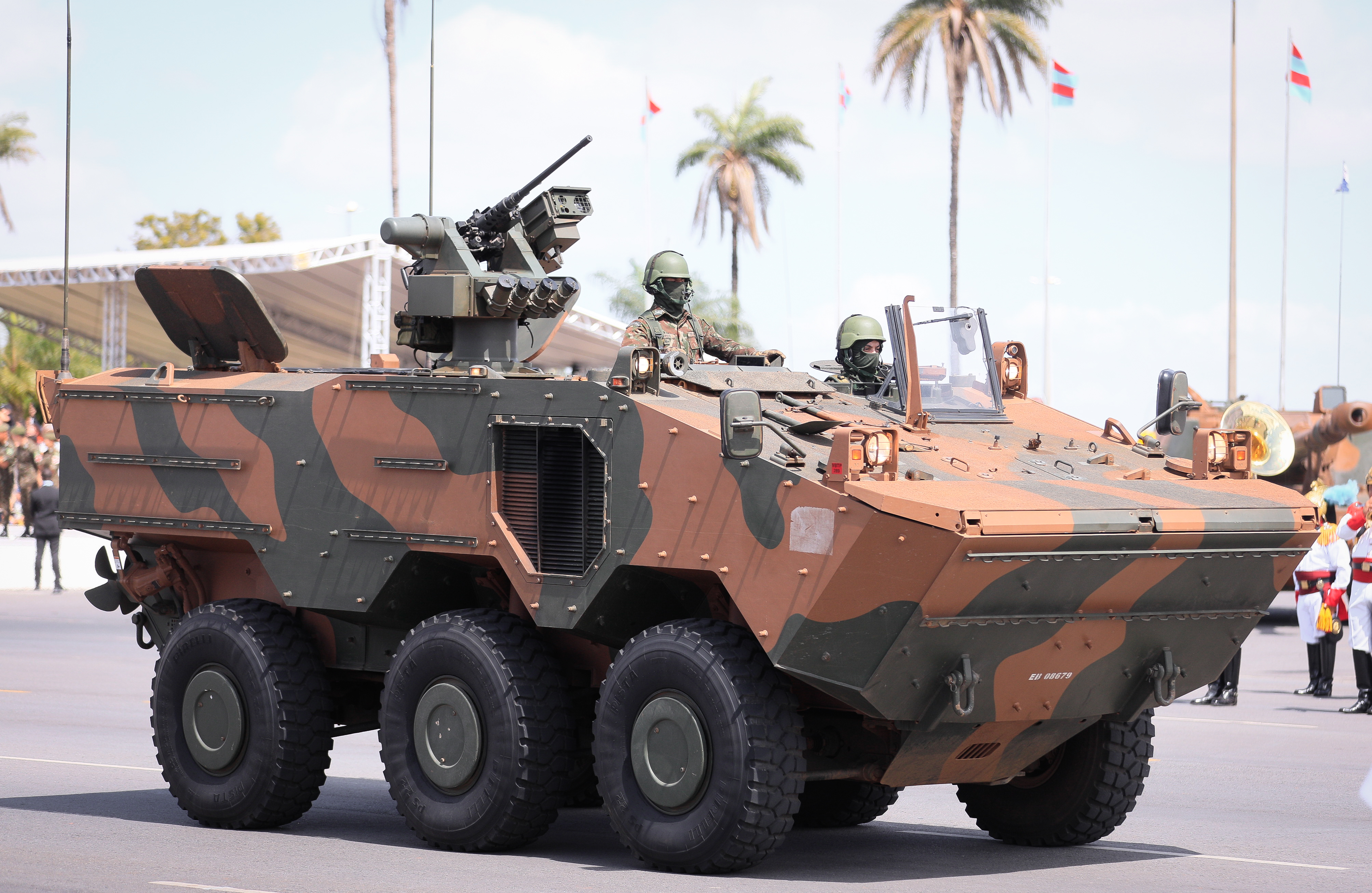
- The VBTP-MR
- Type: Amphibious wheeled Armoured personnel carrier
- Place of origin: Brazil / Italy

Service history
- In service: since 2014

Production history
- Manufacturer: Iveco
- Unit cost: US$ 1,074 million (2016)

Specifications
- Mass: 16.7 t
- Length: 6.9 m (23 ft)
- Width: 2.7 m (8.9 ft)
- Height: 2.34 m (7.7 ft)
- Crew: 3 (+ 8 passengers)
- Armor: Basic armour: STANAG 4569 Level 2. Add on armour: STANAG 4569 Level 4 (max)
- Main armament: Armoured remote controlled AEL Systems UT30 turret 30 mm Mk44 Bushmaster II autocannon with Coaxial FN MAG MG 7.62 mm, 6 smoke grenade launchers (can be fitted with add on armour), equipped with infrared/thermal/night vision electronic sight.
- Secondary armament: 7.62 mm FN MAG MG, M2 Browning installed in Remote controlled stabilized REMAX turret (fitted with 4 smoke grenade launchers, electronic thermal/infrared, night vision), or armoured manual turret REMAN (STANAG 4569 Level 2).
- Engine: Iveco Cursor 9 diesel engine 383 hp
- Suspension: Hydropneumatic
- Operational range: 600 km (370 mi)
- Maximum speed: 110 km/h (68 mph)

The VBTP-MR Guarani (Portuguese Viatura Blindada Transporte de Pessoal – Média sobre Rodas; "Armored Personnel Transport Vehicle – Medium on Wheels") is a 6×6 armoured personnel carrier developed by Iveco and the Brazilian Army as part of its "Urutu-III" modernization program aimed to replace all EE-11 Urutu by 2015. The VBTP-MR is the base of Iveco's Superav armoured personnel carrier. Other Brazilian companies also participated in the program, such as IMBEL (Communications), Elbit (Armaments), Usiminas and Villares (development of national ballistic structural steel).

== History ==
In 1999, the Brazilian Army issued a request (ROB #09/99) for a new family of armored fighting vehicles with amphibious capabilities to replace the EE-9 Cascavel and EE-11 Urutu. The main feature of this new family should be its modular design, allowing the incorporation of different turrets, weapons, sensors and communications systems onto the same carriage. The development program also include a communications version, an ambulance version and different fire support versions, armed with large calibre mortar and gun systems.

The Brazilian Army has signed with Iveco a contract worth about €2.5 billion for supplying armoured personnel carriers of the VBTP-MR model. The vehicles will replace the old Urutu armoured vehicle employed today by the Brazilian armed forces. The contract covers the delivery of 2,044 vehicles and logistical support for a period of 20 years. Deliveries were scheduled to begin in 2012, and continue for 18 years. The total order was later scaled down to 1,580 units, under a timetable stretched to 2035. By 2023, the Army considered a further cut in the total number to around 900 units.

There is also an 8×8 variant of the vehicle.

== Versions ==
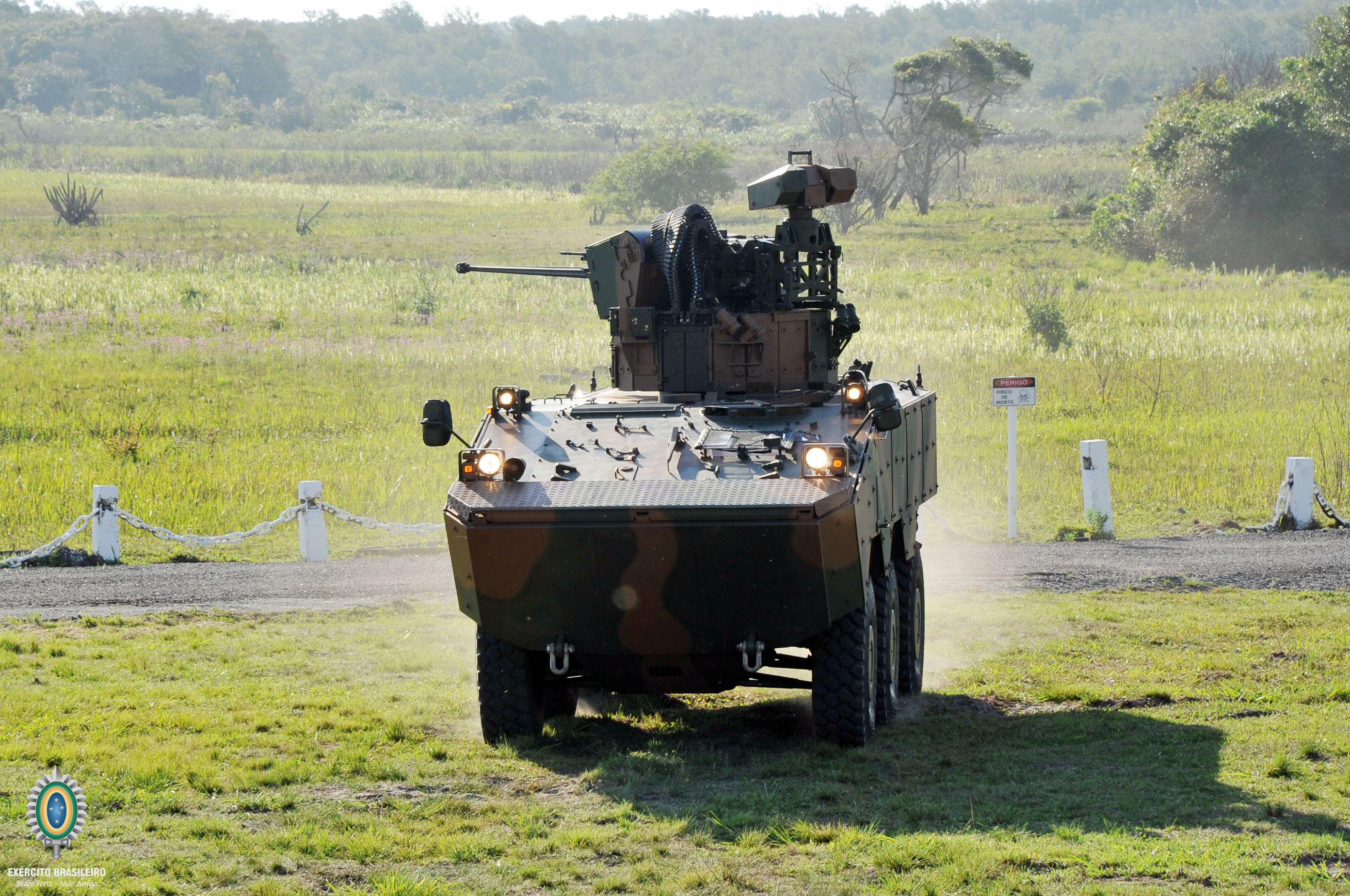
VBCI-MR Guarani (UT-30BR)

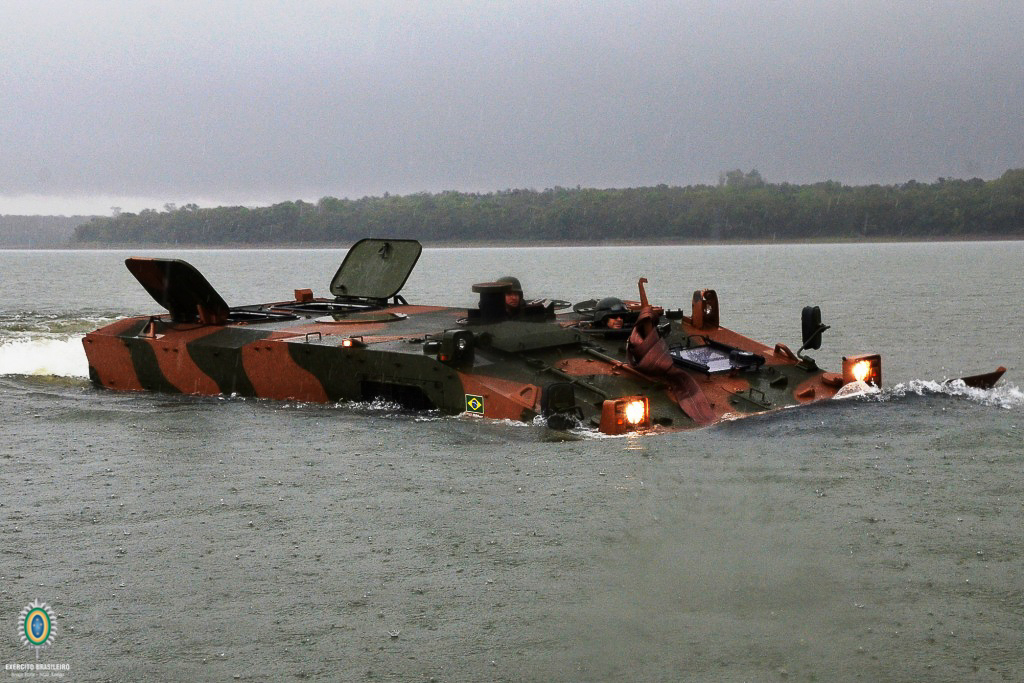
Guarani in amphibious operation

As of 2021 the VBTP-MR has several planned variants of which the VBTP armored personnel carrier has entered production and service, while the rest are under development:

- VBTP (armored personnel carrier)
- VBCI (infantry fighting vehicle with 30 mm turret)
- VBE PC (command post)
- VBC-MRT (mortar carrier, possibly 120 mm)
- VBR MR (105 mm cannon)
- VBE CDT (fire control)
- VBE COM (communications / command and control)
- VBE OFN (workshop)
- VBE SOC (armored recovery vehicle)
- VBTE AMB (ambulance)
- VBE ENG (engineering)
- VBC AAe (anti-air)

The requirements for the VBTP-MR VBCI included an ELBIT remote control turret, equipped with a Mk44 Bushmaster II cannon and a 7.62mm machine gun; it should also be able to fire anti-tank guided missiles. This turret, capable of 360 degree swivel and elevation / depression of -15 to +60 degrees, was chosen by the Brazilian Army on a selection made from among four companies. It is expected to be manufactured in Brazil. The firing system has a laser rangefinder, vision and fire control by day/night thermal vision, double shot of command (commander and gunner of the car, with precedence for the later), automatic target tracking system, and hunter killer smoke launchers. A significant aspect of this vehicle is that the turret is equipped with weapons sights and it is stabilized in two axes, allowing firing on the move with very high probability of hit within the first shot. Future needs will determine what kind of instruments will equip the turret, possibly after the vehicle enters service.

Some speculate that the VBE / CP version will fashion a battle management system. The first level at which information must flow in a bidirectional way, what is known as "situational awareness", refers to the tactical commander. The distress (probably the VBCI) and reconnaissance models are planned to have an 8×8 drive train.

In September 2021, the Brazilian Army launched a test campaign of a new engineering variant. The unit is equipped with an excavator manipulator arm (EMA), earth anchor blade (EAB) and a straight obstacle blade (SOB) systems, supplied by the British company Pearson Engineering Ltd. In April 2023, the Brazilian Army presented the anti-air version equipped with a RBS 70 NG system.

=== Armament ===
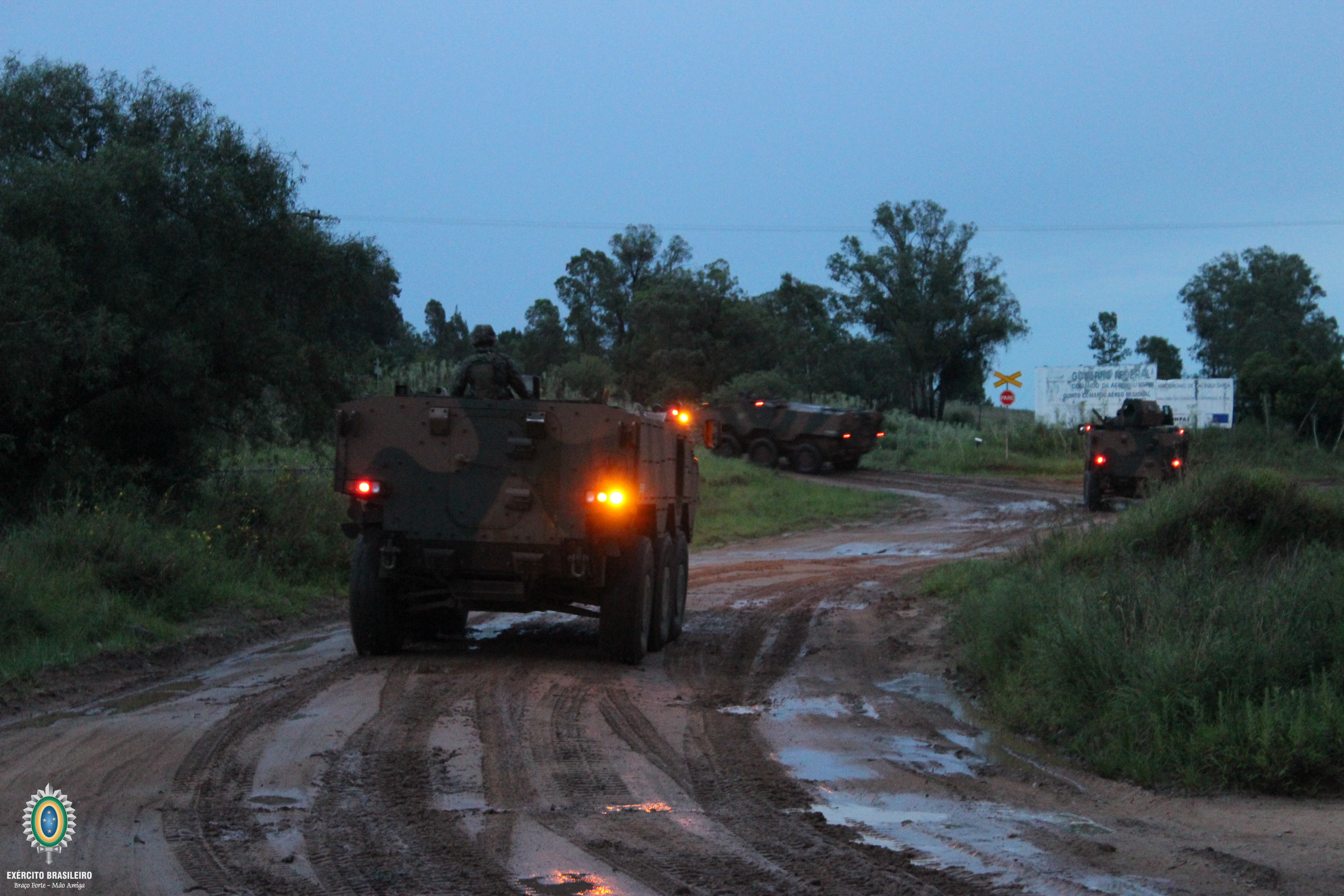
Convoy of Guarani armored vehicles

- UT-30BR turret by Elbit Systems, which will be produced in Brazil by AEL Sistemas S.A (Aeroeletronica). (30 mm autocannon)
- REMAX turret by Ares Aeroespacial e Defesa S.A. and CTEx. (12.7 mm (.50) machine gun)
- possibly a 120 mm mortar (mortar version)
- possibly a 105 mm cannon (reconnaissance version)
- RBS 70 NG (anti-air version)

== Export ==
Compared to the model in use today by the Brazilian Army, the new project brings advantages such as upgraded armor protection, increased mobility, increased range, independent hydropneumatic suspension, increased protection against mines, better ergonomics, air conditioning, brake system with double disc and ABS, GPS, automatic detection and extinguishing of fire, night operation capability as standard and laser detection system.

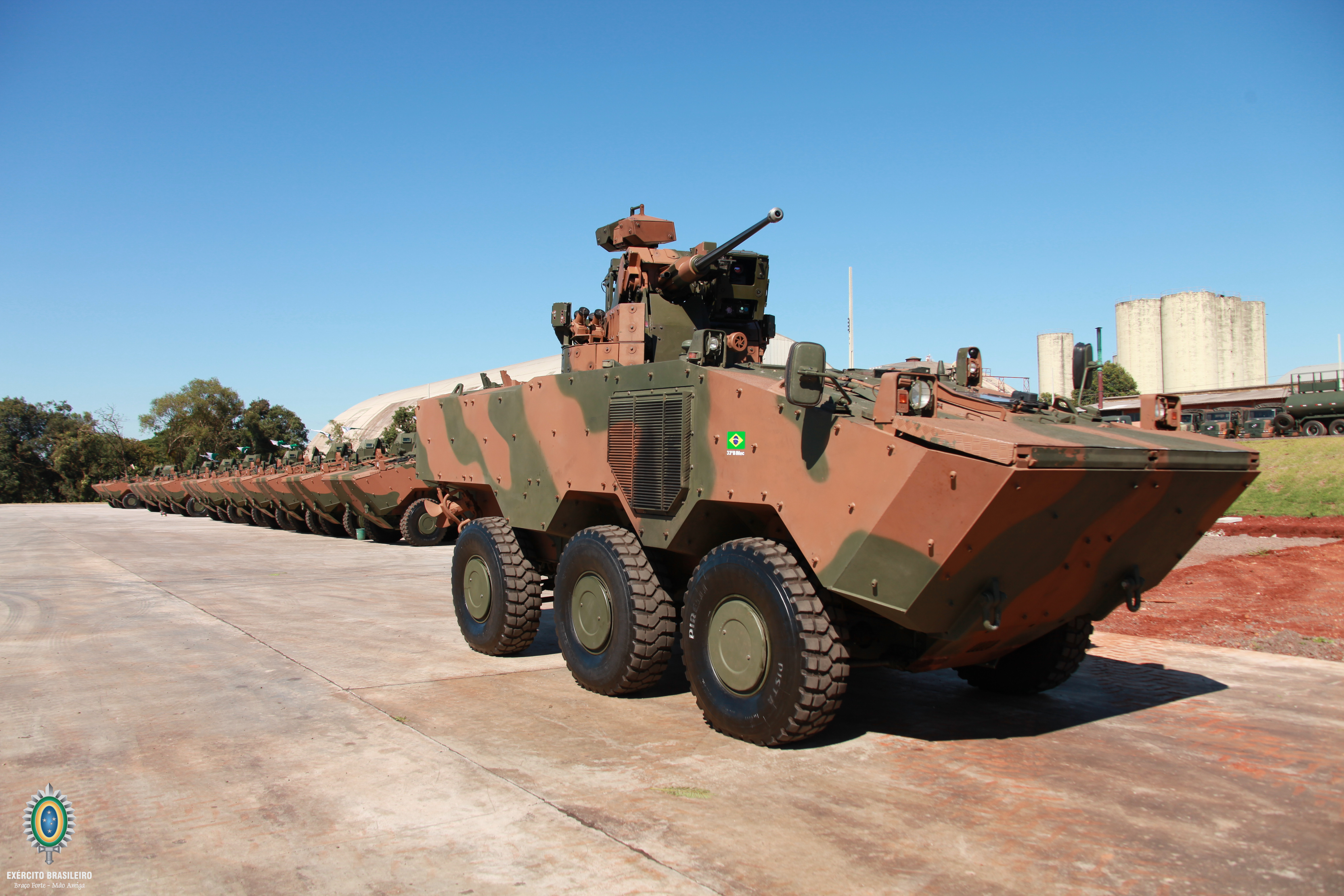
VBTP-MR Guarani in Brazilian service

According to Waldemir Cristino General Romulo, Military Project Manager, there is an interest in exporting the VBTP-MR to other markets, because Brazil has already sold vehicles to Latin America, Africa and Asia-Pacific in the past. The Argentine Army expressed interest in an 8×8 version. Armies also from Chile, Colombia and Ecuador showed interest in the Guarani.

=== First orders ===
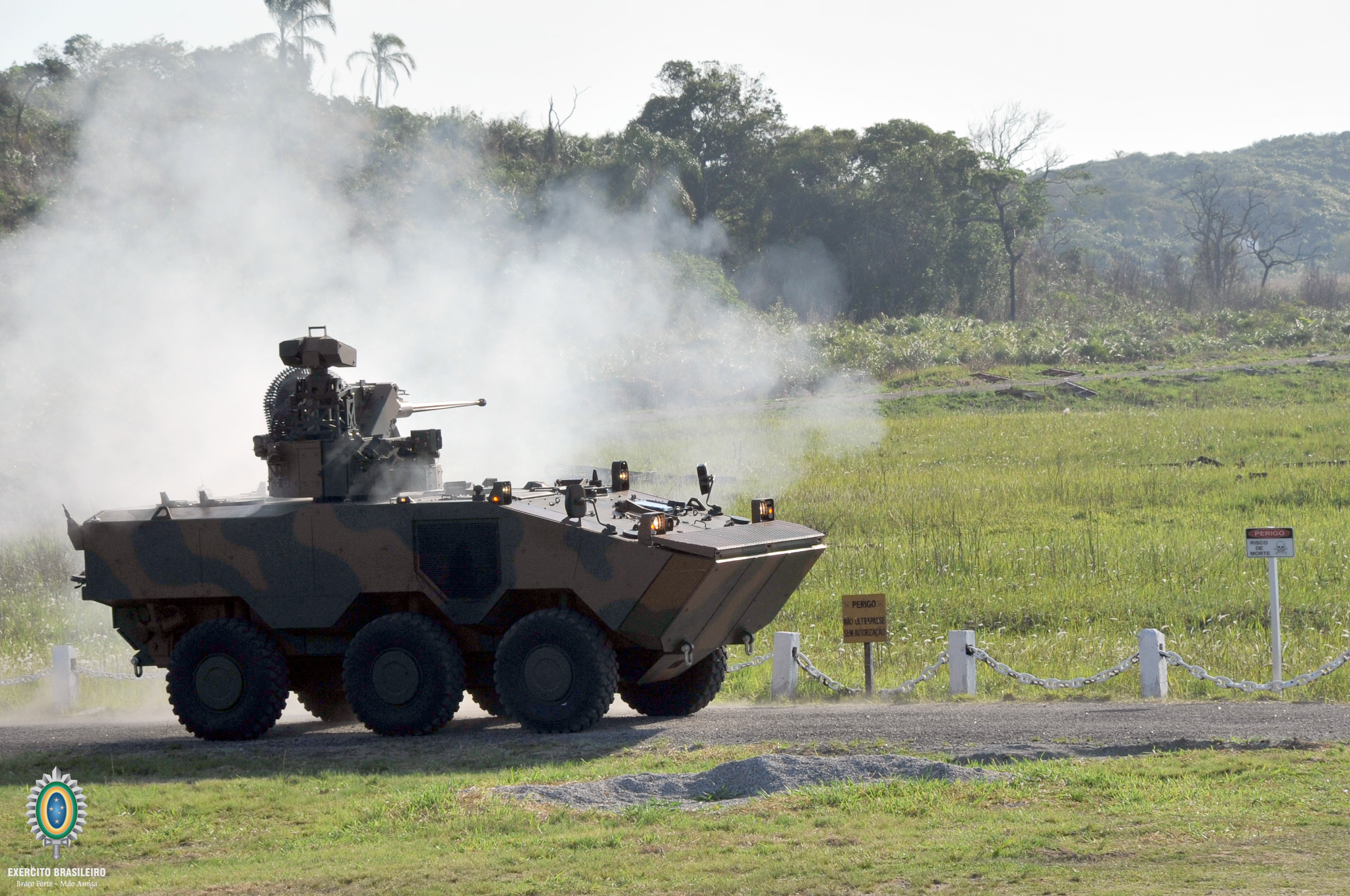
Guarani in firing operation

On the 26 November 2009, the Brazilian Defence Minister, Nelson Jobim, announced that President Lula had authorized the start of production for 2044 new vehicles with the new name Guarani, formerly known as Urutu III. According to him the new vehicle would replace the entire mobility system of the Brazilian Army. Also according to the minister, $6 billion would be invested in construction for the Guarani over 20 years. It was predicted that the first vehicle would be ready in 2010 and 16 vehicles would be tested by 2011. From 2012 on, the actual production would begin.

The army commander, General Enzo Martins Peri, signed the contract for the manufacture of vehicles on 18 December 2009. The examinations would be held at Army's test range (CAEx), located in Barra de Guaratiba, west of Rio de Janeiro state. The tests would examine the vehicle durability, ergonomics and armour in situation such as landmine explosions,

Only on 7 August 2012, the Brazilian Army signed a contract to produce 86 Guarani. The order was completed by December 2012.

In March 2014, the 33rd Motorized Infantry Battalion of the 15th Mechanized Infantry Brigade will receive the first 13 vehicles. It will be the first regular army unit to be issued the new vehicle. It will be part of trials using the initial 86 vehicles to figure out doctrine for its use in service.

=== In service ===
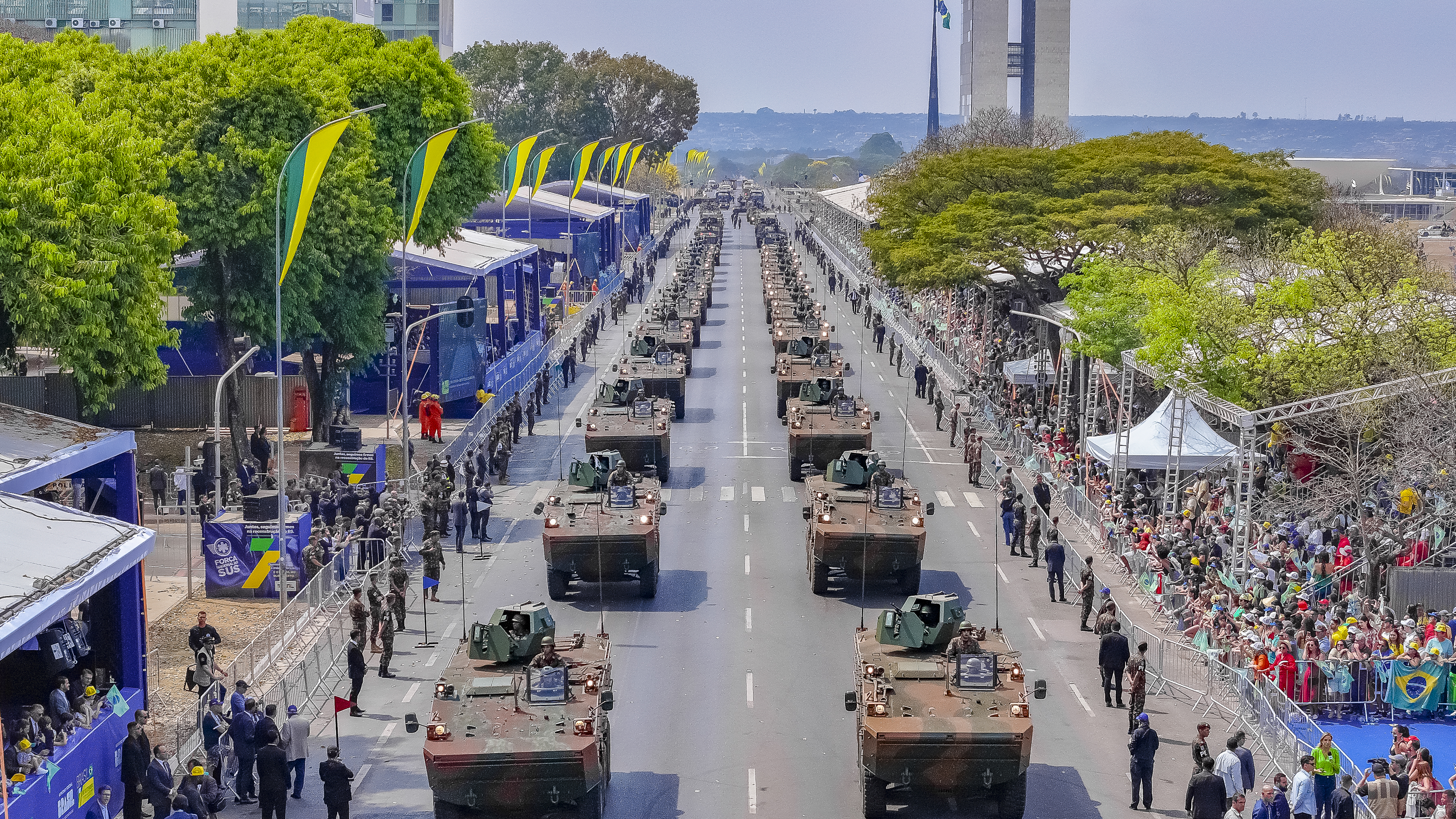
Guaranis in 2024 Brazil's Independence Day Parade

In 2018 the 30th Mechanized Infantry Battalion in Uberlandia-MG received 30 VBTP-MR Guaranis.

In 2020, The 14th Mechanized Cavalry Regiment of São Miguel do Oeste received ten VBTP-MR Guaranis equipped with the Remax tower.

In 2021 the 11th Mechanized Infantry Brigade, in Campinas-SP, was equipped with more than 126 VBTP-MR Guaranis. In July, the first units of the Brazilian Army in the northeast of the country started to receive the first Guarani vehicles, an example of the 10th Mechanized Cavalry Squadron of the 11th Infantry Brigade.

On August 4, 2021, it was the turn of the 41st Motorized Infantry Battalion, it becomes the newest military organization to be equipped with the armored personnel transport vehicle, medium on wheels (VBTP-MSR) 6X6 Guarani, with the receipt of eight units, all with SARC REMAX.

== Operators ==
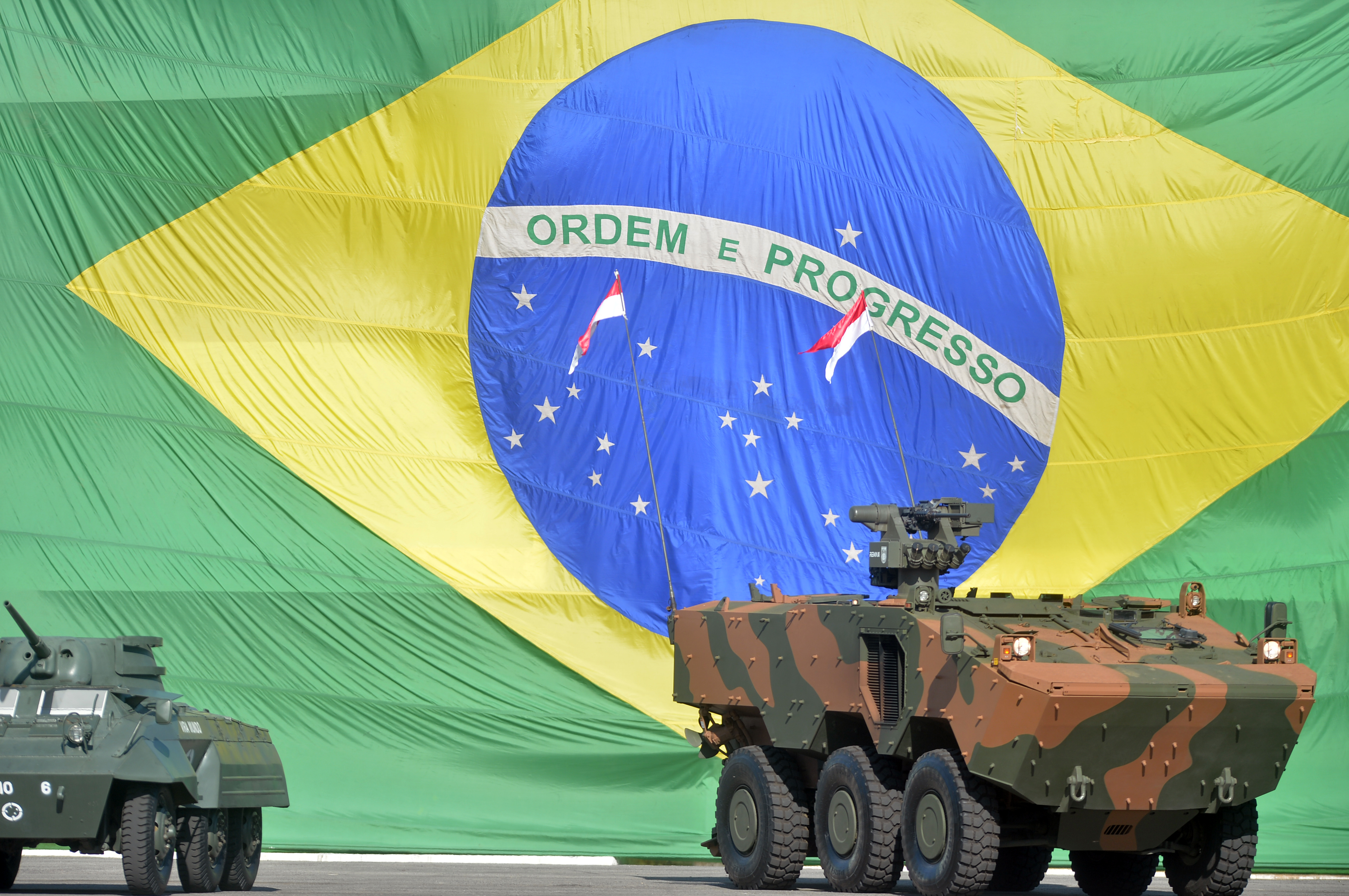
VBTP-MR Guarani armed with a Remax during the ceremony to commemorate the 71 years of the Battle of Monte Castello; next to it an M8 Greyhound used in Italy.

Brazil
Brazilian Army: 700+ Deliveries started in December 2012, with four pre-series and 50 purchased units.
Ghana
Ghana Army: 11 ordered in July 2021 equipped with REMAX turret.
Lebanon
Lebanese Army: 10 units ordered in 2015.
Philippines
Philippine Army – Fourteen (14) units out of 28 total ordered of the armored personnel carrier variant equipped with the Elbit Systems RCWS Mk. 2 were formally received and inducted into service on 5 March 2024. The first Guarani was received by the Philippine Army on 8 March 2024.

=== Potential operators ===
Malaysia
Ciro Nappi reported that the Guarani will participate in a tender to replace the Condor and SIBMAS AFSV90 against the K806, Anoa 2, LAVII and the FNSS Pars.

=== Failed Exports ===
Argentina
Participated in a tender against the Chinese Norinco VN-1 and the American Stryker. Argentina declared its aim to buy 156 Guarani armoured vehicles produced in Brazil, having signed a letter of intent on 2022 December 23.. Argentina selected used Stryker acquired from the United States through FMS from 2025 onwards.
Ukraine
Ukraine requested the sale of up to 450 vehicles in 2023, awaiting Brazilian approval for export. In June 2023, it was revealed by Veja, that following orders from the President of the Republic, Lula da Silva, the Brazilian government vetoed the sale of 450 armoured vehicles set for use in humanitarian missions.

== Gallery ==
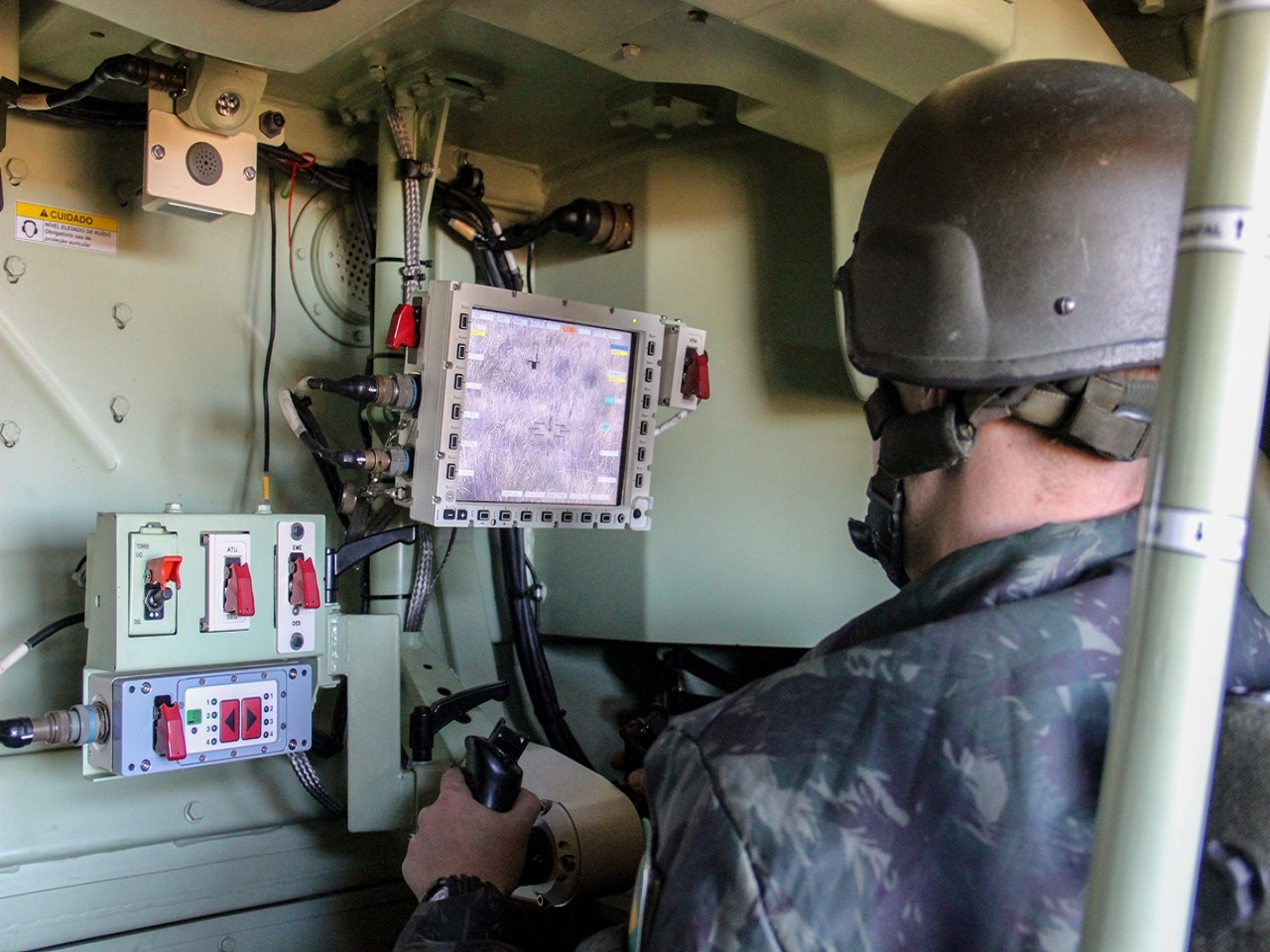

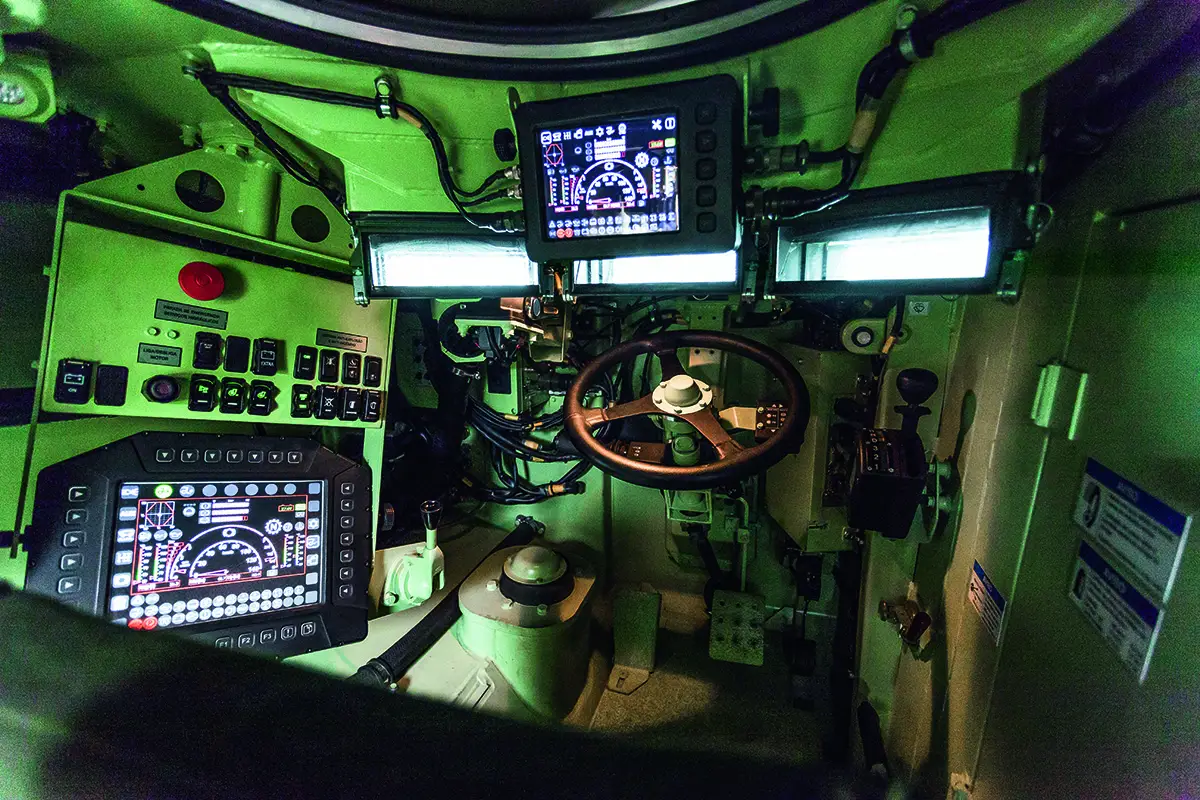

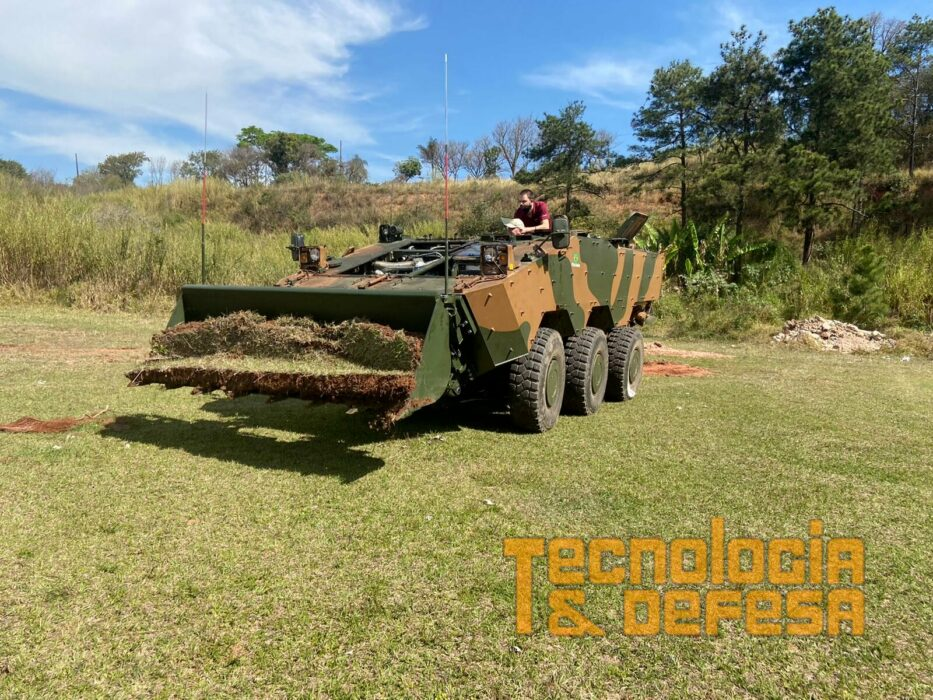

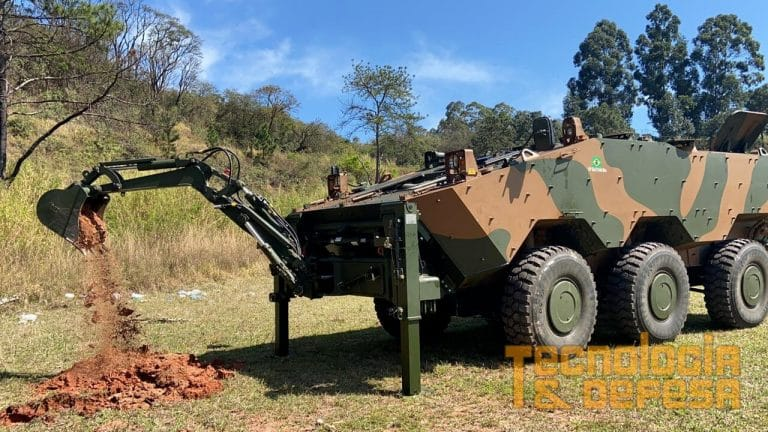

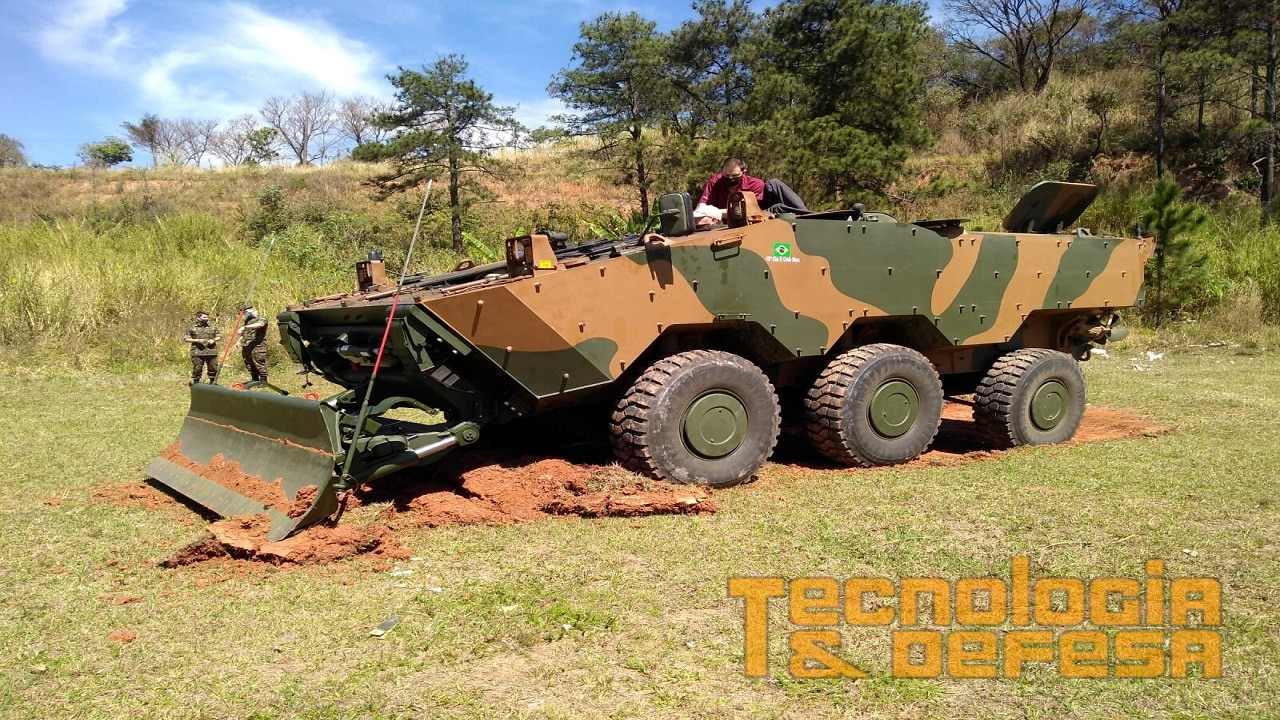

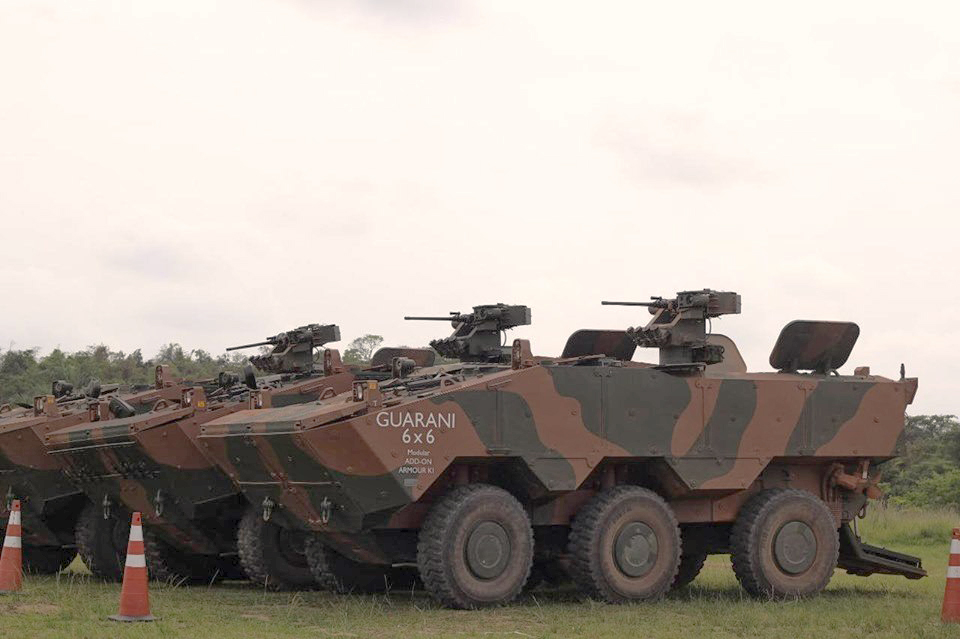

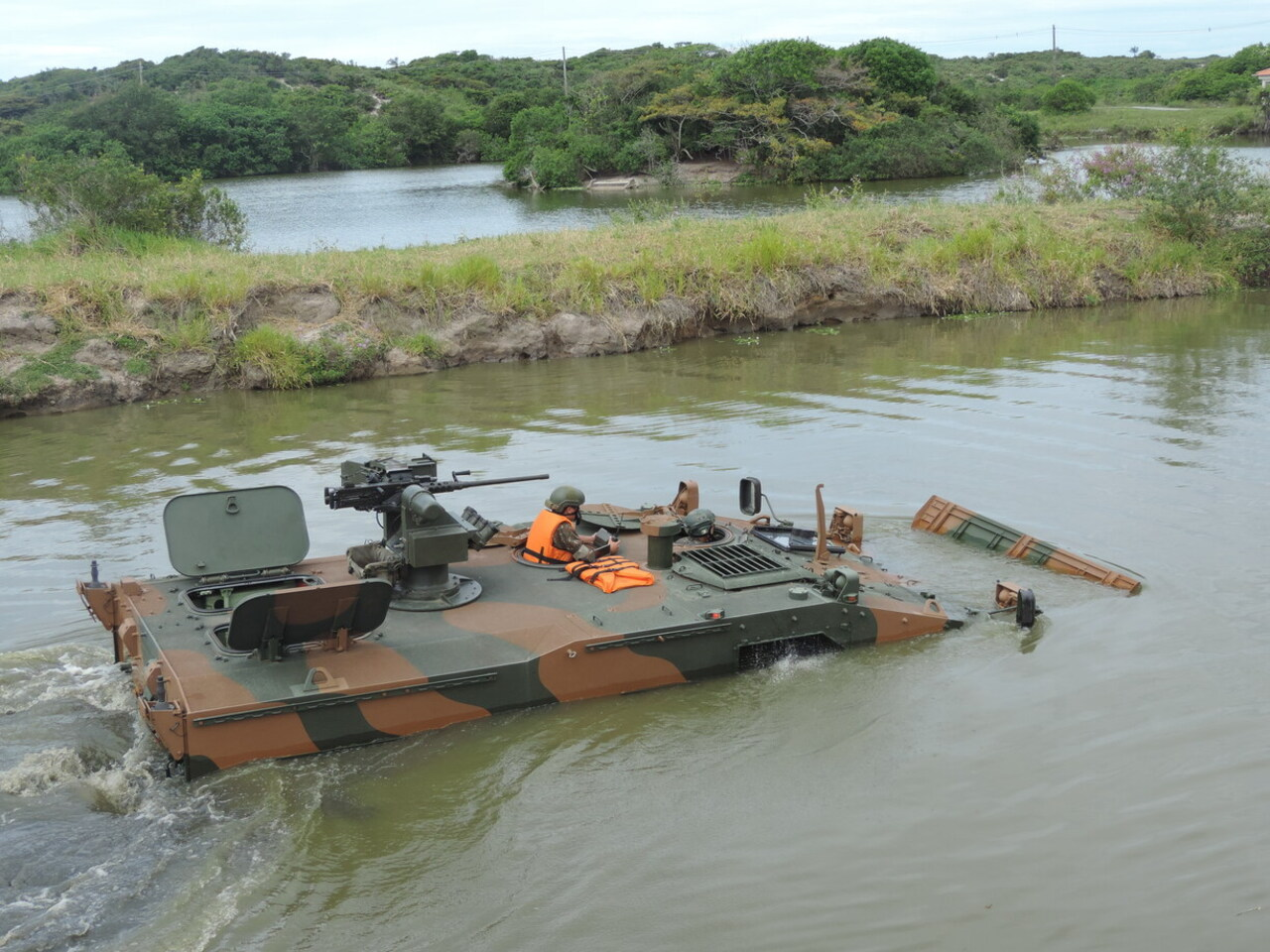

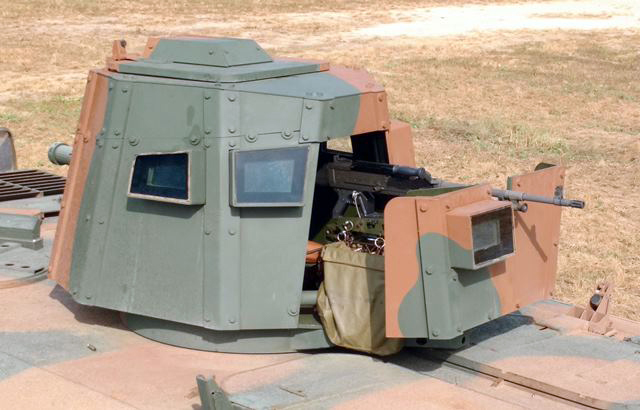

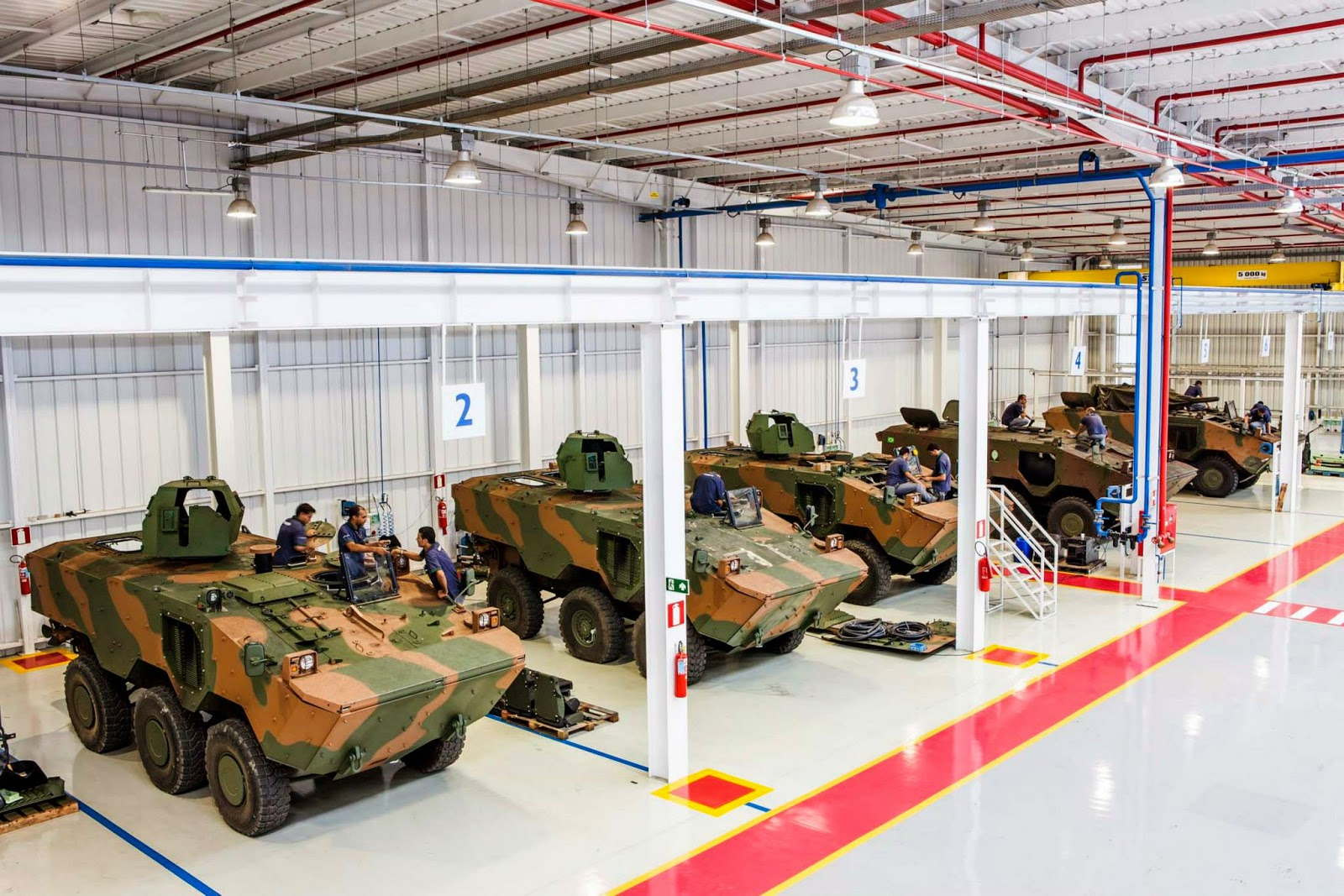

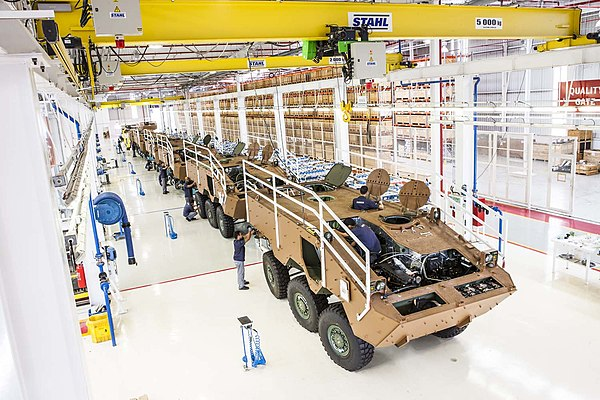

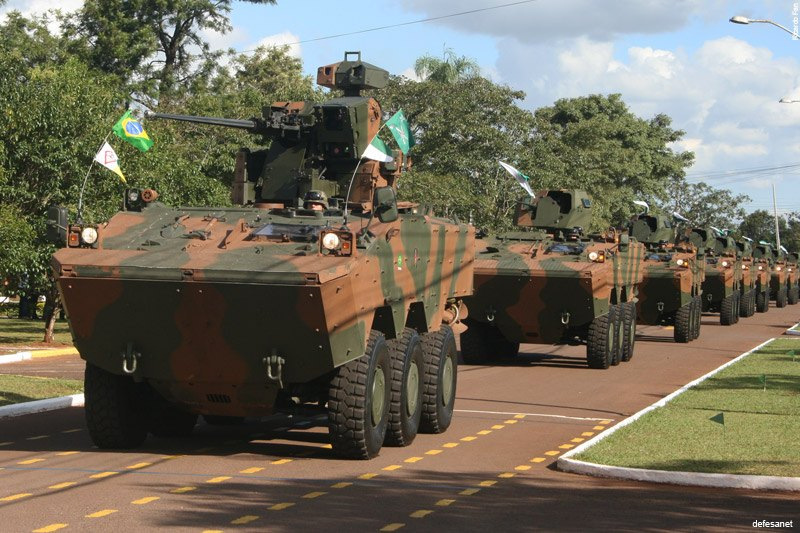
