= Fiat Oltre =

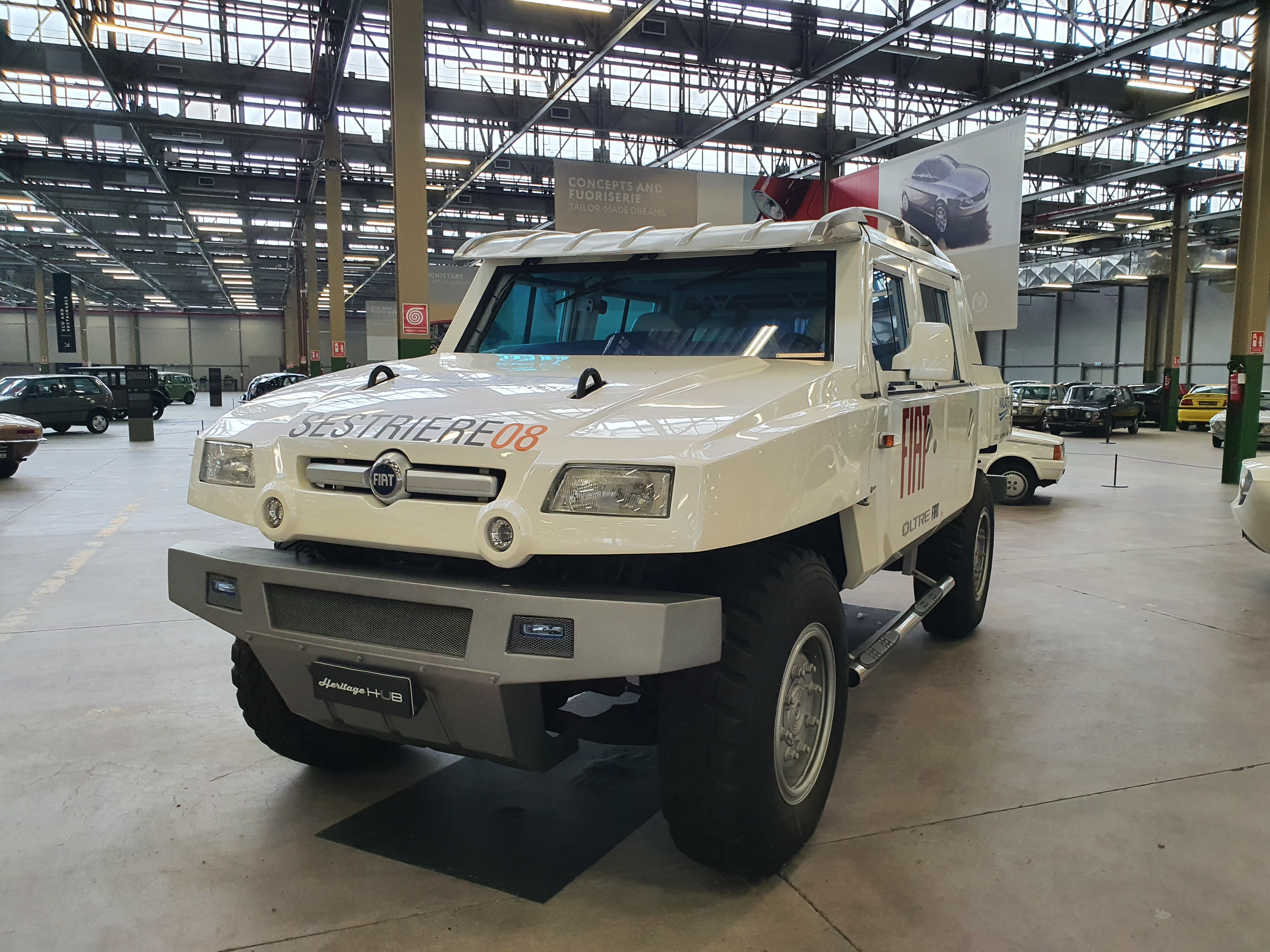

Overview
- Manufacturer: Fiat
- Production: 2005
- Designer: Centro Stile Fiat

Body and chassis
- Class: Concept car
- Body style: SUV
- Layout: Front-engine, four-wheel drive
- Related: Iveco LMV

Powertrain
- Engine: FPT F1C (3.0L Inline 4)

Dimensions
- Wheelbase: 3,230 mm (127.2 in)
- Length: 4,870 mm (191.7 in)
- Width: 2,200 mm (86.6 in)
- Height: 2,050 mm (80.7 in)
- Curb weight: 4,000 kg (8,818 lb)

The Fiat Oltre is an off-road concept car produced by the Italian automobile manufacturer Fiat and unveiled in 2005 at the Bologna Motor Show.

The vehicle is based on the military Iveco LMV (Light Multirole Vehicle).
