= Reparo de Metralhadora automatizada X =

Remote weapon system

Remax (Reparo de Metralhadora Automatizada X) is a Brazilian remote weapon system produced by CTEx (Brazilian Army engineers) and Ares Aeroespacial e Defesa S.A. It's a flexible system able to receive many configurations, like 7.62×51mm NATO, 12.7 mm. The system gives soldiers 360° capacity and is equipped with night vision, thermal vision, high resolution camera and zoom. The project is in advanced stage. From now on, only minor modifications will be made in order to reduce system weight, thus improving their performance.

Remax will be used with the VBTP-MR Guarani, Brazil's next generation of armored personnel carriers.

== Development ==
The Remax has been developed incrementally:

- Phase I: allowed day shooting with 12.7 mm (.50 in) machine guns;
- Phase II: the system could alternatively employ 7.62 mm machine guns;
- Phase III: added night vision equipment, and;
- Phase IV: the system will be stabilized to allow shooting from a moving car.

== See also ==
- CROWS
- SWARM
- Raven Srws
- Protector (RWS)
