= Tanks of China =

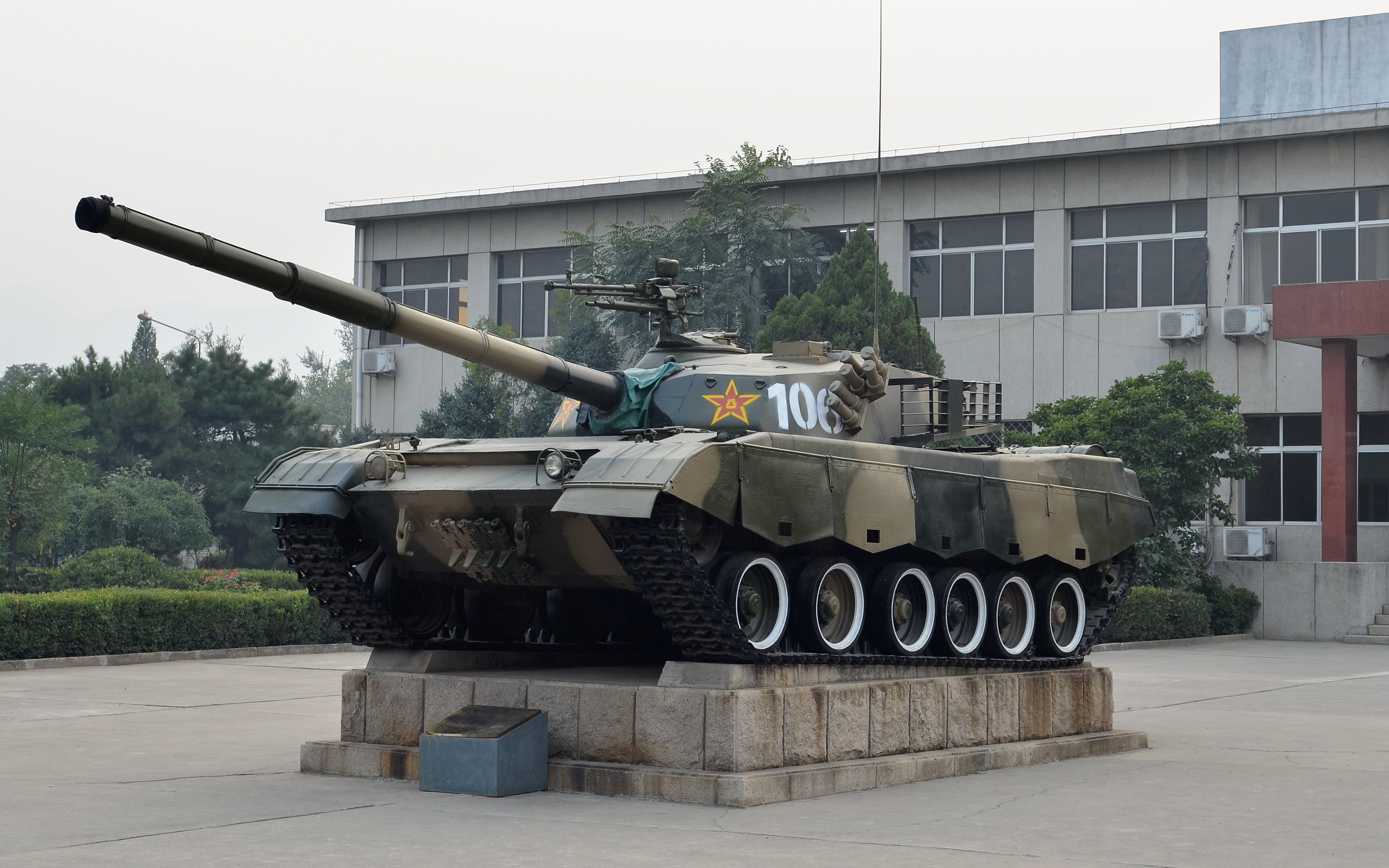
Chinese ZTZ-96 tanks in Chinese Tank Museum.

This article on military tanks deals with the history of tanks employed by various military forces belonging to the Kuomintang and Chinese Communist Party (CCP) within China. From the early half of the 20th century, tanks were initially obtained from other countries; eventually indigenously designed Chinese tanks started manufacture and became used during the Cold War and towards the modern era.

== Overview ==
The first tanks and armored cars in Chinese hands were imports they could acquire and some armoured vehicles they fashioned ad hoc. Warlords set up their own armies and bought what tanks and weapons they could. The Chinese use of armored fighting vehicles prior to 1943 suffered from many of the same problems as that of the artillery, and most of China's small inventory of AFVs were quickly lost in combat or were simply allowed to break down due to lack of maintenance and spare parts. Armor was not used en masse for shock, but in penny packets in an infantry support role exclusively; tank against tank fighting with the Japanese was never contemplated and never attempted.

== Political developments influencing Chinese armoured forces ==
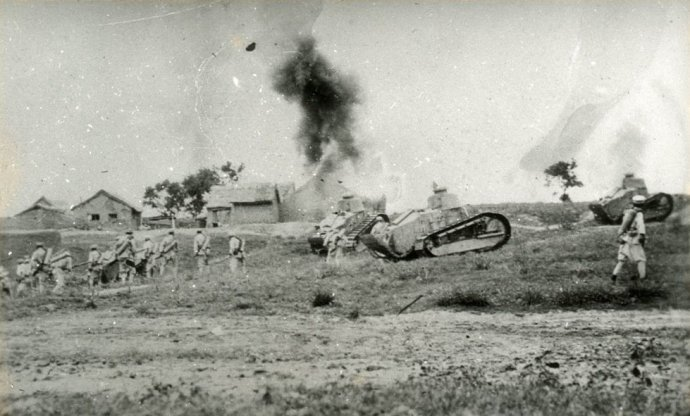
Renault FT tanks of the Fengtian Army, c. 1928.

After the decline and overthrow of the Qing Dynasty following the Xinhai Revolution, China was left without any generally recognized central authority and the army quickly fragmented into forces of combating warlords, nominally the Beiyang Army, but actually fighting each other. Those warlord armies would have their own suppliers and were equipped with non-standard material, differing wildly from region to region, and even with different calibers within the same subunits. The strongest of those warlords were Wu Peifu, "The Jade Marshal", and Zhang Zuolin, "The Tiger of the North". The former imported French Citroën-Kégresse halftracks, while the latter got Renault FT and Schneider tanks. The Tiger of the North was also the first to get armoured trains from the defeated White Russian armies in Siberia after the fall of Vladivostok in 1922; with other trains being built locally under Russian supervision.

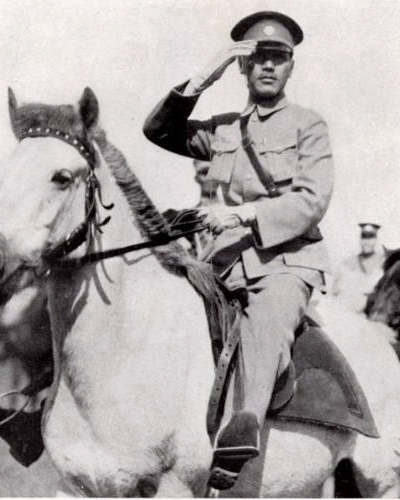
Chiang Kai-shek, Commander-in-Chief of the National Revolutionary Army, emerged from the Northern Expedition as the leader of China.

Foreign advisers were commonplace, with Japanese and Russian advisers being employed by the many warlords. The Russians included renegade White Russians, experienced veterans of the Russian Civil War; they primarily manned technical positions such as artillery and the armoured trains - the latter a paramount asset in the vast, roadless distances of China. The warlord Zhang Zongchang, "The Dogmeat General", was one of the foremost employers of White Russians, with some 3,000 "White Guards" under the Menshikov brothers. The armoured trains were intended to be used offensively and could carry troops, weapons and supplies; with them being considered so valuable in the campaign of 1927–1928, that captured or surrendered train crews were shot on the spot.

Sun Yat-sen, first provisional president of China and his protégé Chiang Kai-shek tried to bring the warlords under control in order to establish order throughout the nation; to do so, Sun Yat-sen founded the Kuomintang ("Chinese National People's Party"). In the early 1920s this revolutionary army was just another warlord army, small and very poorly equipped, even by warlord standards. Being from the south, from Canton, it was typically in the "low end" of warlord armies and so had a poor military reputation. This began to change when a Soviet military advisory mission was established in late 1923. In 1924, Sun Yat-sen set up the Whampoa Military Academy to train and indoctrinate cadets as the leaders who would take the fight to the warlords. The extremely poorly equipped National Revolutionary Army (NRA) started receiving large quantities of Soviet material from 1924 to 1926, when it felt ready to face the warlord coalition of the Beiyang government, the National Pacification Army (NPA) in the Northern Expedition (1926–1928). Chiang Kai-shek took Sun's place at the head of the party when the latter died in 1925 and led the Northern Expedition to unify the country, becoming China's overall leader.

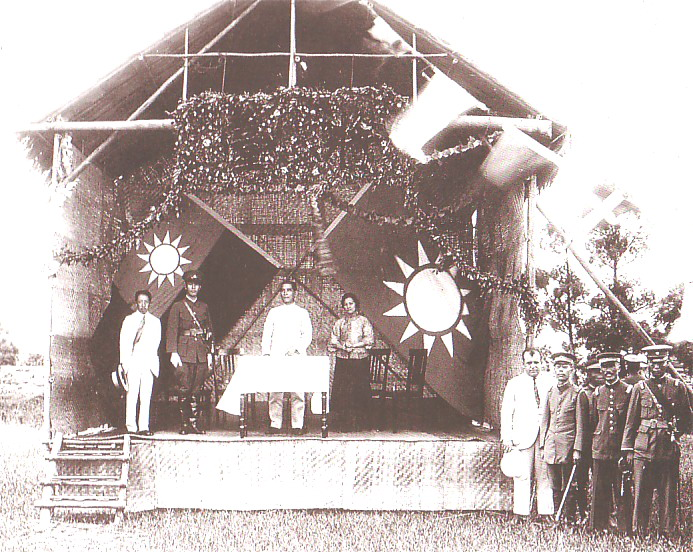
Sun Yat-sen (middle) and Chiang Kai-shek (on stage in uniform) at the founding of the Whampoa Military Academy in 1924.

Weimar Germany started a military cooperation with the NRA from 1926 that would endure until 1941. This cooperation intensified with the Nazi takeover of Germany in 1933 and would end in 1941 when, in July, Hitler officially recognised Wang Jingwei's puppet government in Nanking. Before that, Japan asked Germany to withdraw its military advisors in 1938. This German military mission, under Hans von Seeckt from 1933 to 1935, supplied small arms, artillery, armoured cars, and Panzer I light tanks to the NRA. The NRA armoured force was organized in three armoured battalions, with the first and 2nd battalions having 29 Vickers-Carden Loyd amphibious tanks each, with 20 Vickers 6-Ton tanks being distributed among the 1st and 2nd battalions. Also, 29 Carden Loyd Mark VI tankettes served in the 2nd battalion. The third battalion had 15 Panzer I Ausf. A, bought in 1936, 20 Italian CV-35 tankettes and 15 Leichter Panzerspähwagen (mostly SdKfz 222, two SdKfz 221, with at least one SdKfz 260).

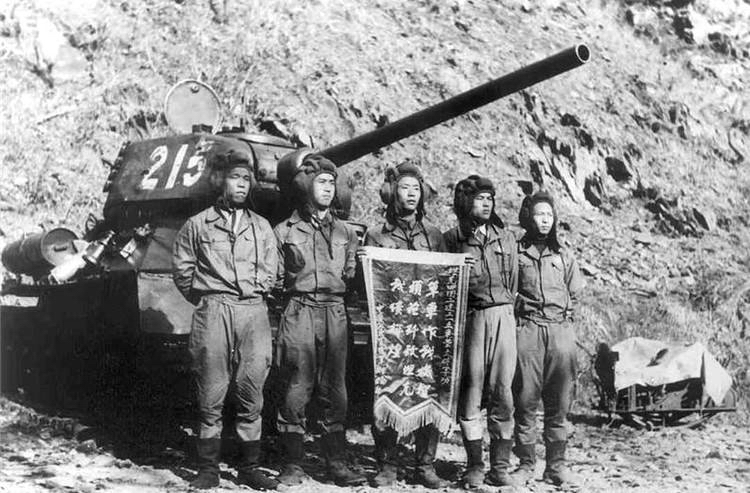
Chinese T-34/85 tank and crew during the Korean War, 1952.

In the course of 1937, the NRA's three tank battalions were wiped out by the Japanese, with the remnants being regrouped into the new 200 Division, that was augmented by Soviet T-26 light tanks. Created in 1938, this unit would survive up to 1949 through different reorganizations. From 1941 onwards the Chinese Nationalists would rely more and more on the United States, receiving large quantities of M3 and M5 Stuart light tanks and M4 Sherman medium tanks. After the Japanese surrender in 1945, the NRA and the Chinese Communist Party (CCP) engaged into a power struggle for control of China. Both sides used Japanese captured tanks and US-supplied tanks, mainly Stuart light tanks. The leader of the Communists, Mao Zedong, established the People's Republic of China (PRC) in mainland China in 1949, with Chiang Kai-shek and the Nationalists holding onto only Taiwan Province and minor islands in Fukien. On 1 October 1949, the communists' People's Liberation Army (PLA) held a major parade in the capital Beijing, with smaller parades in other major cities, with the tanks being a mixture of Japanese tanks captured by the NRA and then captured by the PLA, American tanks supplied to the NRA through Lend-Lease and captured by the PLA, and Soviet T-26 supplied by the Soviet Union to the PLA.

In October 1950, Mao made the decision to send the People's Volunteer Army into Korea against the United Nations forces led by the U.S. in the Korean War; Chinese armies fighting there were equipped with Soviet-made heavy weapons, including T-34 tanks. During the early 1950s, China began producing copies of the Soviet T-34 tank and established its own manufacturing plants to build further improved designs (predominantly copies of Soviet designs) until the current and contemporary Chinese tanks which bear their own domestic influences.

== History ==
=== Post World War I ===
Chinese FT of the Fengtian clique.

The Chinese warlord Zhang Zuolin introduced tanks to China. France had dispatched a small contingent of Renault FT tanks to Vladivostok in 1919, during the joint Allied intervention that began in August 1918 with the tanks being later acquired by the Manchurian Army under Zhang Zuolin.

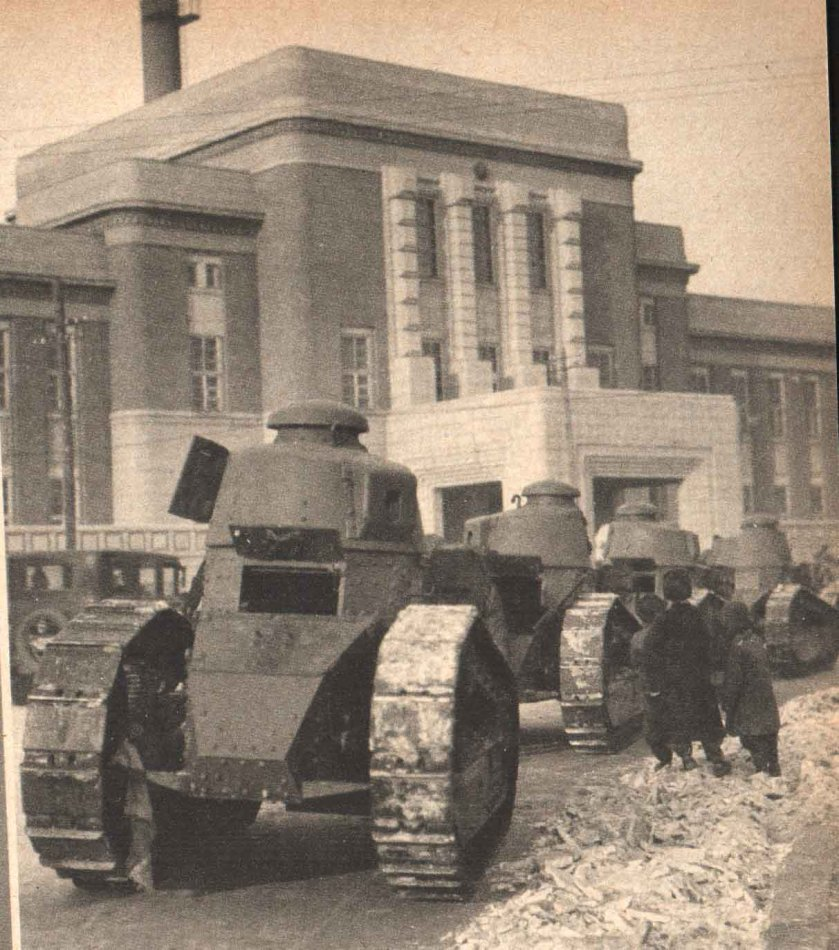
FT-17 tanks captured by the Japanese after the Mukden Incident, 19 September 1931.

Surprised during the Northern Expedition by Chiang Kai-shek's National Revolutionary Army, he bought several Renault FT tanks armed with 37 mm guns from France in 1927. However, by 1929 the FTs were under the Chinese Nationalists and nominally attached to the 1st Cavalry Brigade of the Chinese National Revolutionary Army (NRA), which by 1930 had acquired 36 FTs. However, the Japanese Army seized nearly all of Chinese/Manchurian FTs in 1931 when they occupied Manchuria. The tanks captured by the Japanese army were deployed in the Kwantung Army and later used during the Mukden Incident.

In 1929, 24 of the British Mk VI Carden Loyd tankettes were purchased by the Chinese Nationalists.

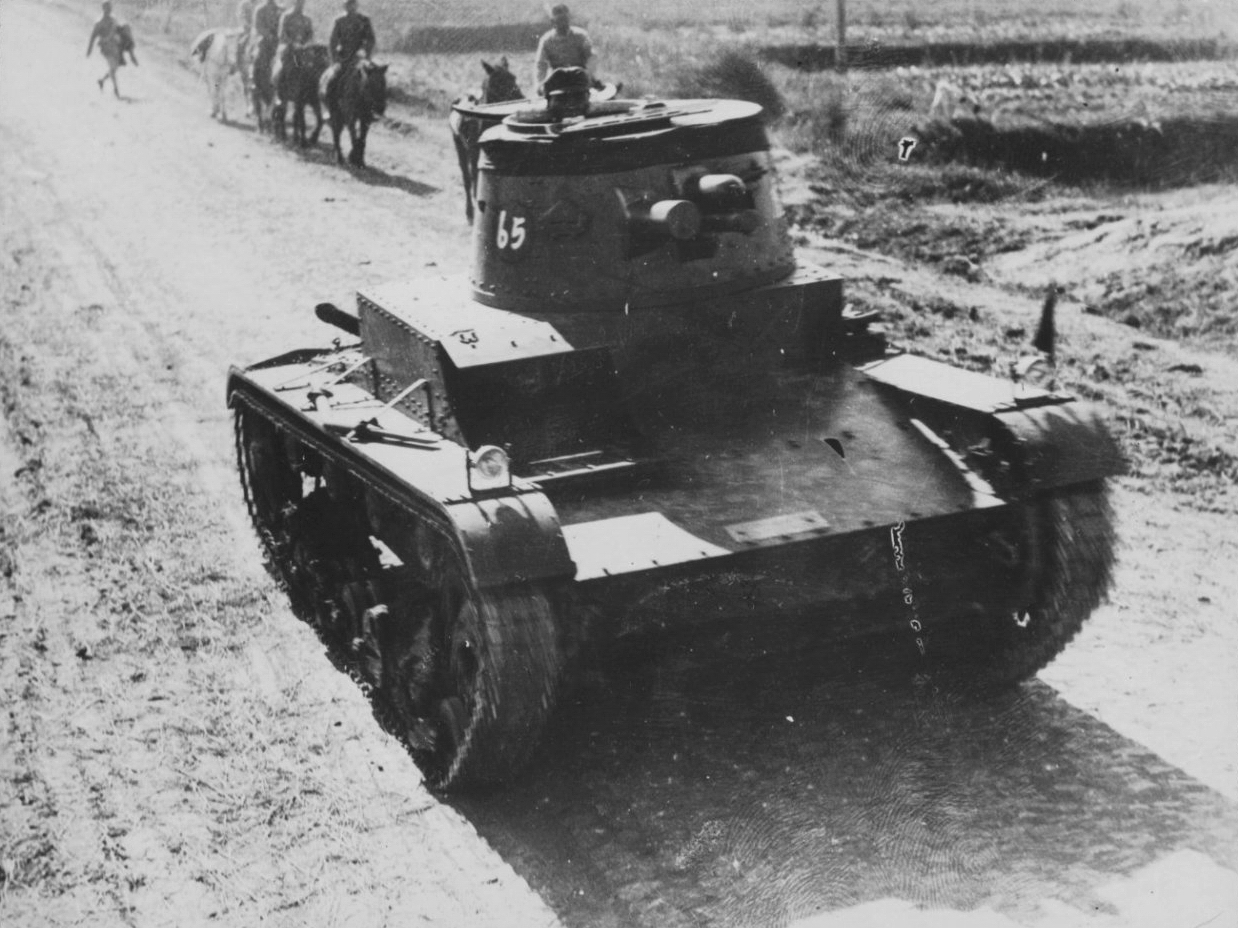
Vickers Mark E 6-ton tank.

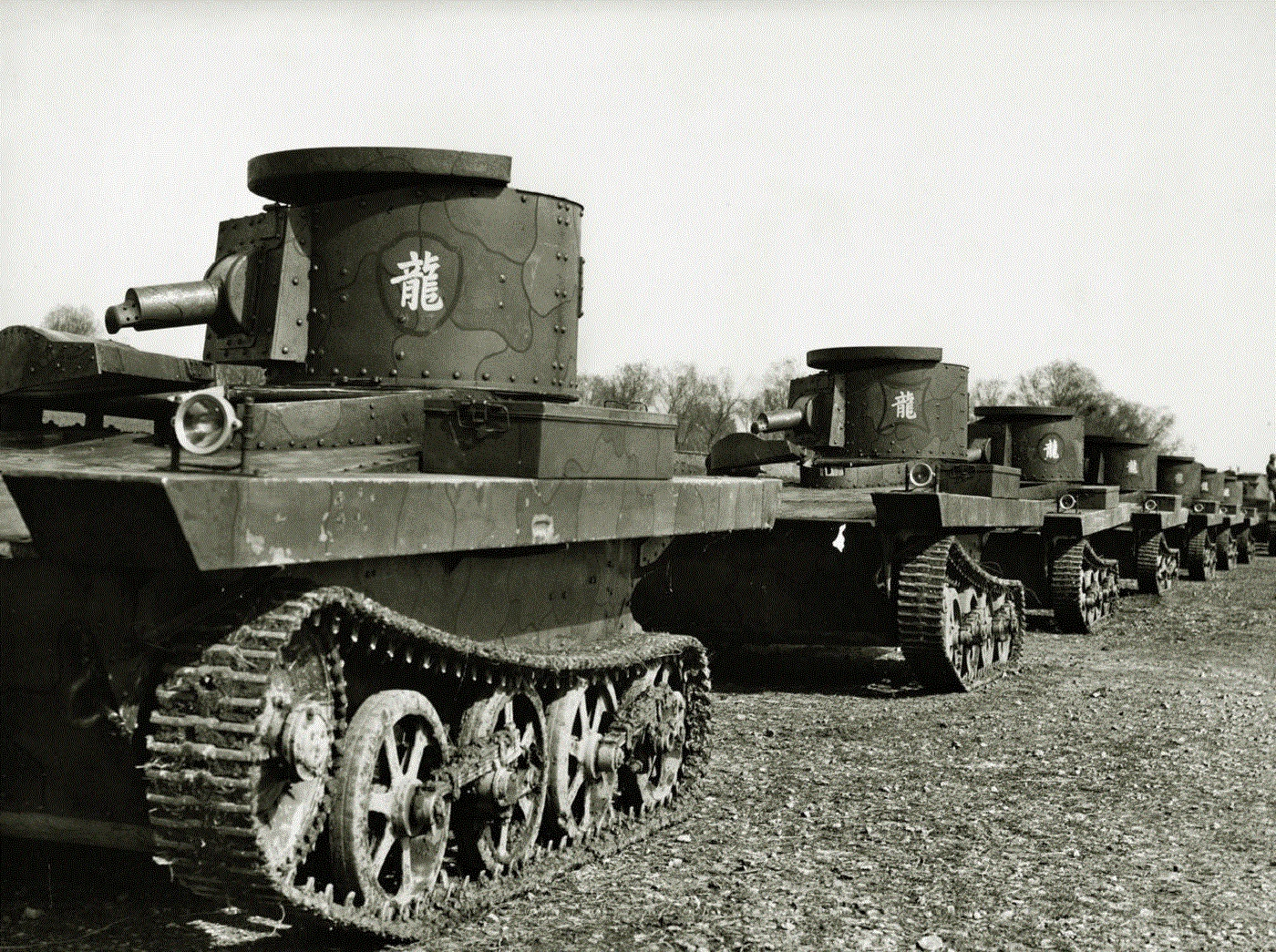
Chinese markings on Vickers-Carden-Loyd Light Amphibious Tanks.

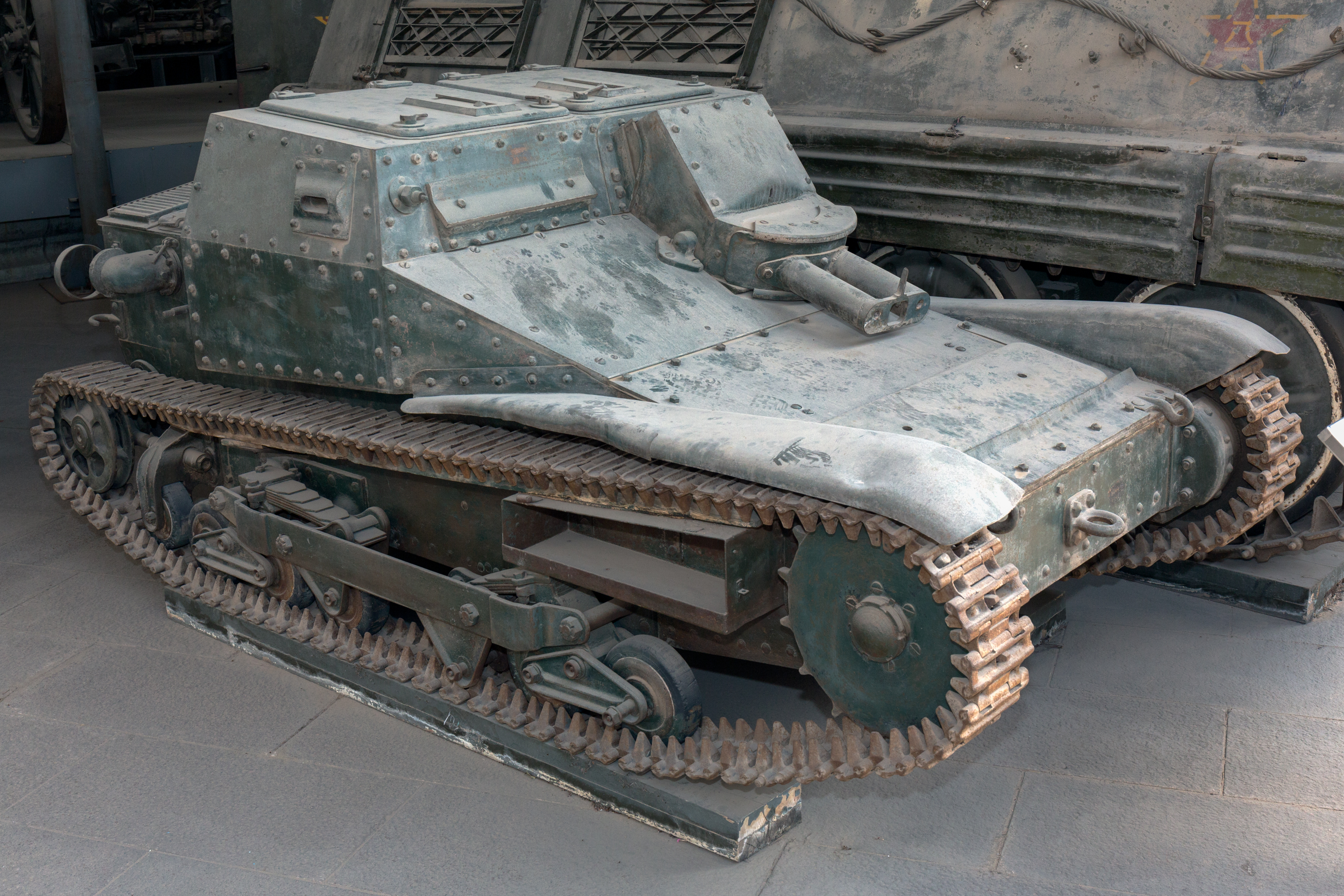
CV-35 light scout tank.

Influenced by the Japanese tank performance during the First Battle of Shanghai, the Chinese Nationalist government started the mechanisation of the army in 1933, with the 24 British Carden Loyd Mk VI tankettes. Later they bought 20 Vickers 6-ton tanks between 1934 and 1936, which were used in combat against the Japanese in the Battle of Shanghai in 1937. They also bought 29 Vickers Amphibious Tanks, which were developed in 1932 but not used in the United Kingdom.

The Sino-German cooperation, which had begun between Germany and China since before World War I had been instrumental in modernizing the industry and the armed forces of the Republic of China, so it was natural to look to German military advisers to help them. The Chinese urgency to modernize the military and its national defense industry, coupled with Germany's need for a stable supply of raw materials, put the two countries on the road of close relations from the late 1920s to the late 1930s.

In 1927, after the dissolution of the First United Front between the Nationalists and the Communists, the ruling Kuomintang purged its leftist members and largely eliminated Soviet influence from its ranks, and General Chiang Kai-shek severed the ties with the Soviets. Chiang Kai-shek then turned to Germany, historically a great military power, for the reorganisation and modernisation of the National Revolutionary Army, and German advisors started to come in. The Nationalists hired many German military advisers to help them with their buildup of the mechanisation and training of the army.

When Adolf Hitler became Chancellor in 1933 and disregarded the Treaty, the anti-communist NSDAP and the anti-communist KMT were soon engaged in close cooperation with Germany training Chinese troops and expanding Chinese infrastructure, while China opened its markets and natural resources to Germany.

The German military advisers made the Nationalists purchase many European weapons through a German company with which the German advisers cooperated. The Nationalists bought Italian CV-35 tankettes, German Panzer I Ausf. A light tanks, and British 12-ton tanks. The exact name of the British 12-ton tank is unknown. The Nationalists bought 29 Vickers Carden Loyd amphibious tank in 1935, and they were organized into the 1st tank battalion. Also, 20 of the British Vickers 6-Ton Mk E & F tanks were purchased by the Nationalists and used in the 1st and 2nd tank battalions. They also purchased other British designs, such as the Carden Loyd M1936, two-man light tank, fitted with radio equipment, in service in 1936. 29 more of the British VCL Mk VI Carriers were purchased in 1936 and used as part of the 2nd tank battalion.

There is information to suggest that in the 1930s, Poland sold three companies of Renault FTs to China, but only as a cover up for their sale to Republican Spain. Also about 6 or 10 Renault UE light armoured carriers armed with Browning MG were bought in France. There were also some Fiat-Ansaldo CV-35 Italian tanks that were purchased, twenty CV-35 tankettes were sold to China. In 1937, 15 Panzer I tanks Ausf. As were sold to China which were used in the Battle of Nanjing by the 3rd Armored Battalion.

With these newly purchased tanks the Nationalists organized three tank battalions in 1936. The 1st Battalion in Shanghai had 32 Vickers Amphibious tanks and some Vickers 6-ton tanks, and the 2nd Battalion also in Shanghai had 20 Vickers 6-ton tanks, 4 Carden Loyd tankettes and carriers. The 3rd Battalion in Nanking had 10 Panzer I Ausf. A tanks, 20 CV-35 tankettes and some Sd.Kfz. 221 and 222 armoured cars. With these armored forces the Nationalists were now able to defeat the local threat of the Communist forces but also had to face the forces of the Japanese army.

=== Sino-Japanese conflict – World War II ===
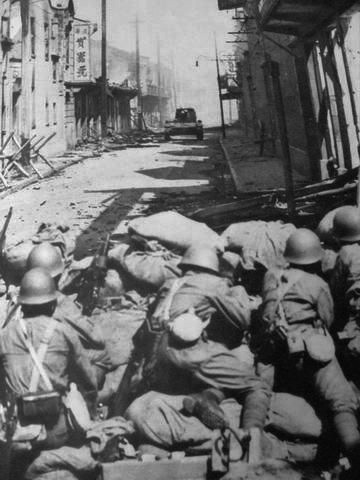
Japanese Special Naval Landing Forces defending against a Chinese Vickers 6-ton tank during the Battle of Shanghai, 1937.

At the outbreak of the Sino-Japanese War in July 1937, the National Revolutionary Army (NRA) had expanded to 1.7 million men. On paper, its order of battle contained 182 infantry divisions, 46 independent brigades, 9 cavalry divisions, 6 independent cavalry brigades, 4 artillery brigades, and 20 independent artillery regiments. Theoretically, a division had two brigades; each brigade having two regiments, an artillery battalion or regiment, an engineer, a quartermaster battalion, plus small supporting units such as signals, medical and transporting. The ten German-trained élite divisions had an average of 9,000-10,000 men. The other, lesser divisions had around 5,000 men with varying numbers of support units. Independent brigades could average 4,000 men, and temporary brigades 3,000.

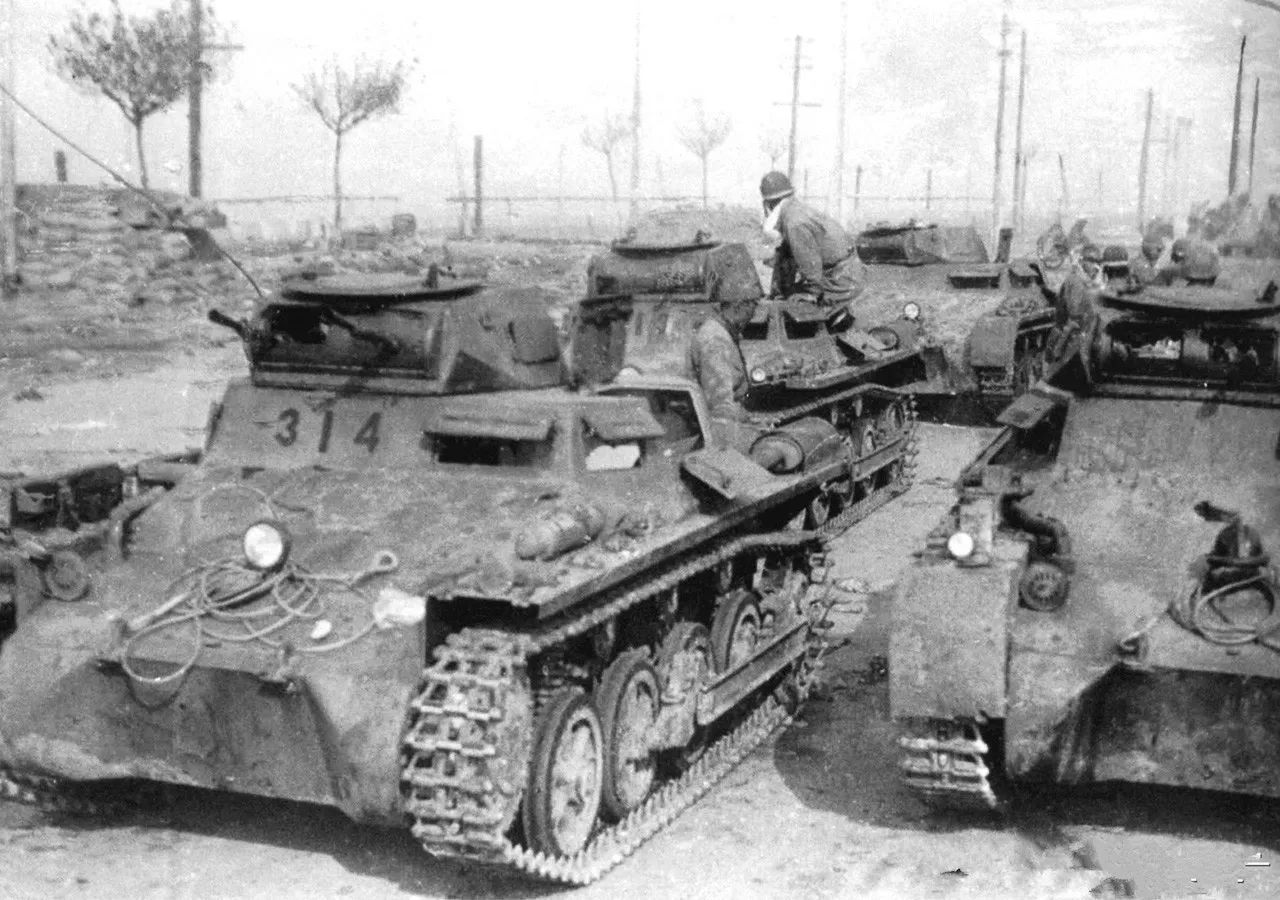
Japanese soldiers inspecting Panzer I Ausf. A tanks abandoned by the Nationalist Army after the Battle of Nanking, 1937.

The NRA's 1st, 2nd and 3rd armoured battalions took part in the Second Battle of Shanghai and the Battle of Nanking and were completely destroyed by the Japanese forces, with many vehicles destroyed or abandoned and captured. The few Chinese tanks and tankettes weren't grouped in large numbers, charging into battle like an armoured fist. Instead, they were dispersed in small groups for infantry support. Chinese tankers would use a motley uniform depending on their vehicles' source, mostly a mixture of German and Italian uniform and gear. All wore simple one-piece linen coveralls, likely supplied by Italy. The crash helmets were either the German 1937 model or the Italian M35 helmet, made of fibre and covered in black leather.

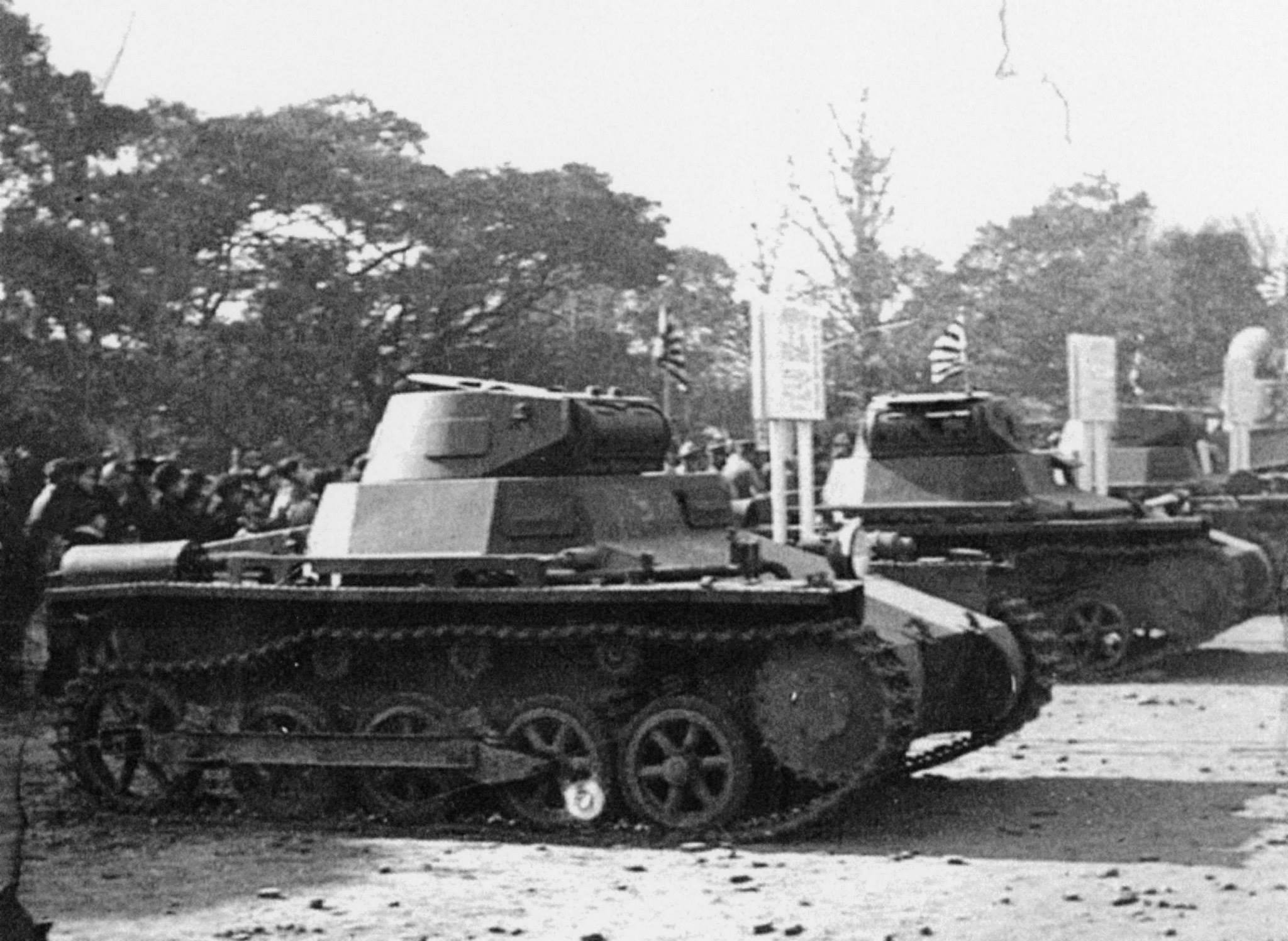
The captured Chinese Panzer I Ausf. A tanks on display in Tokyo, Japan, 8-15 Jan 1939.

After the Germans left, in 1938, the Soviet Union started to support the Nationalists again. The National Revolutionary Army facing Japanese forces had only a small number of armoured vehicles and mechanised troops formed into the three armoured battalions to defend a large front. In August 1937, Chiang Kai-shek's government negotiated with the Soviet government for military aid. The Soviets stepped in and began to provide advisers and tanks arrived in China for the first time in March 1938. After the Chinese armoured force was mostly destroyed in the battles for Shanghai and Nanking, new tanks, armoured cars and trucks from the Soviet Union and Italy made it possible to create the only mechanized division in the army, the Soviet-advised and organized 200th Division, which consisted of one tank regiment and one motorised infantry regiment, and equipped with the T-26 light tank.

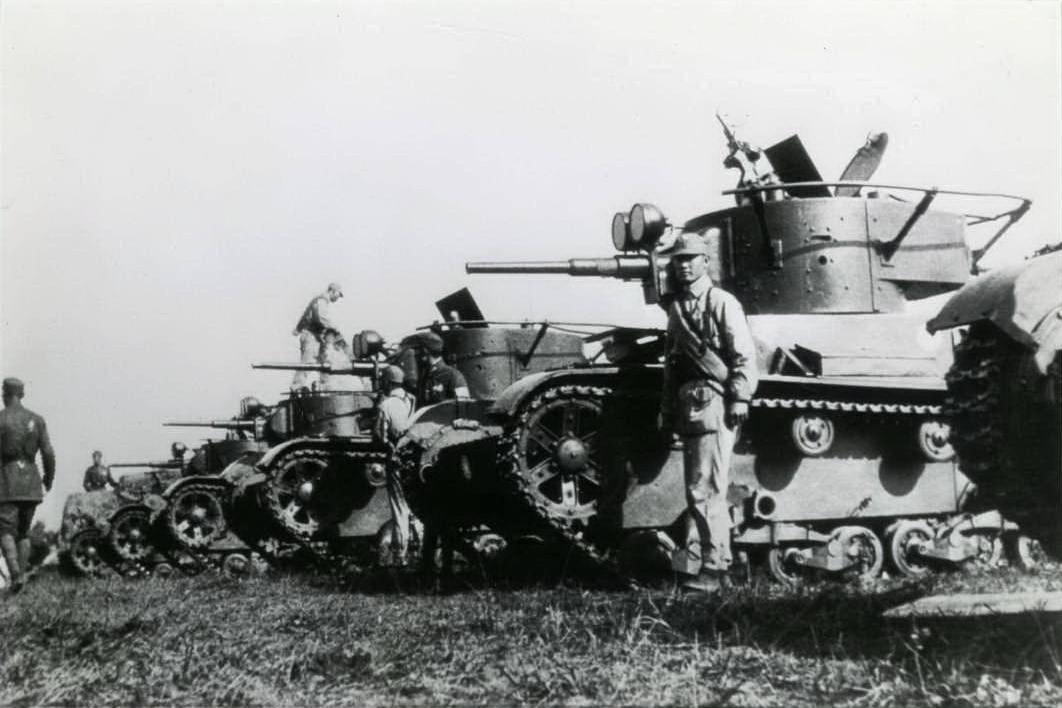
T-26 tanks of Chinese Nationalist Army during WW2.

The USSR sold 82 T-26 mod. 1933 tanks to China as the Soviets were wary of having Japan on its back door. These tanks were shipped to Guangzhou harbour in the spring of 1938.The 200th Division was a mechanized division consisting of four regiments, including a tank regiment equipped with the T-26s, an armoured car regiment, a mechanized infantry regiment, and an artillery regiment. Its first commander was General Du Yuming.

The tank regiments had 70 T-26, 4 BT-5 tanks, and 20 (92?) CV-35 tankettes. The armoured car regiment had around 50 BA armoured cars and 12 (18?) Leichter Panzerspähwagen (Sd.Kfz. 221) armoured cars. The tank regiment consisted of four tank battalions. Each tank battalion had three tank companies. The tank regiments had approximately 200 armoured fighting vehicles (AFVs). The Nationalist government bought 88 T-26 tanks and BA-10 and BA-20 armoured cars. These AFVs and remaining German AFVs were deployed in the 200th Division and the division had its baptism of fire in late 1938 against the IJA 14th Division in the Battle of Lanfeng. In September 1938 the division's original mechanized units (armoured and artillery) were placed under direct command of the 5th Corps, and the division was reorganized as a motorized unit, with 9,000 men. Major-General Dai Anlan was appointed its new commander, General Du Yuming being promoted to command the 5th Corps.

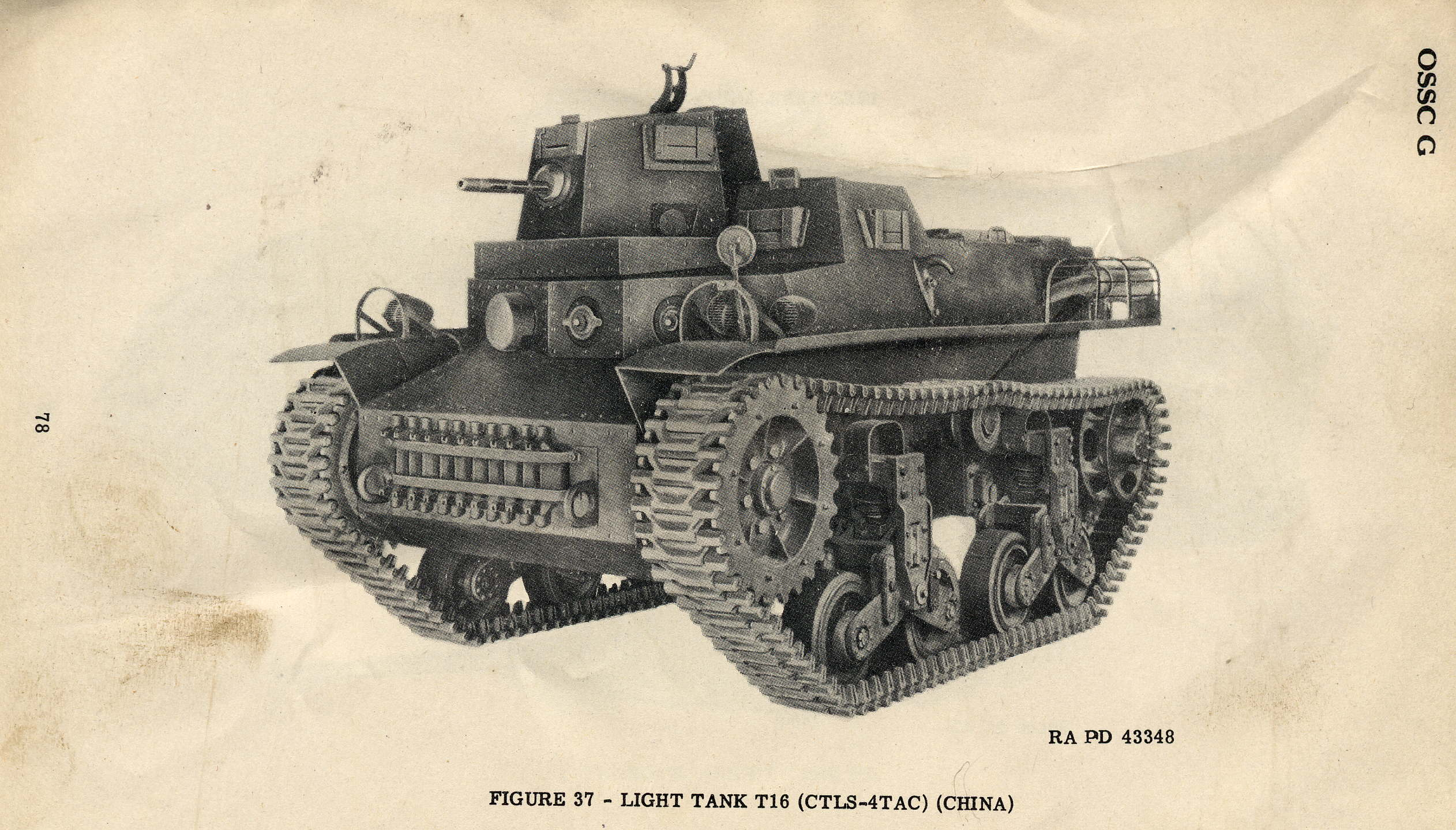
T16 light tank.

The 200th Division participated, as part of 5th Corps, in inflicting a major defeat upon the Japanese army's élite 5th Division at the Battle of Kunlun Pass. Despite losing more men, the 5th Corps managed to hold the Kunlun Pass, thus maintaining its supply lines with French Indochina. The division then suffered heavy losses in an offensive against Batang, losing nearly two-thirds of its strength, having to be rebuilt and reorganized. After signing the nonaggression pact with Germany and defeating the Kwantung Army at Khalkin Gol, the Soviet Union started to withdraw its help from China.

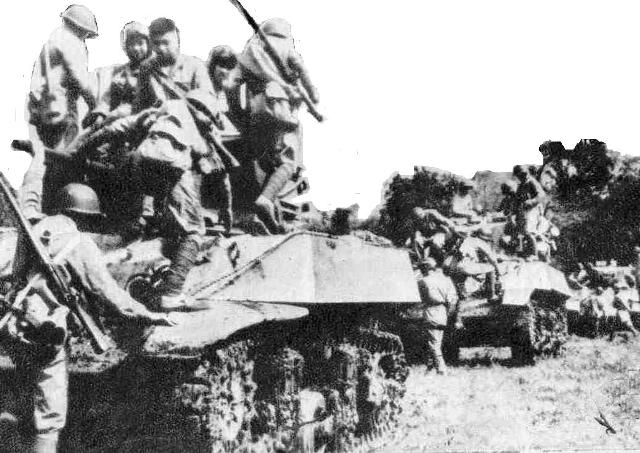
Chinese troops on Stuart tanks.

More than 600 of the T16 CTMS tanks were supposed to be delivered to China under Lend-Lease after Pearl Harbor, the logistical difficulty and its obsolete design compelled the Chinese to reject the offer. Later 233 U.S. M2A4 light tanks were acquired by the Nationalists along with some 48 M3A3, M5A1 Stuart tanks in Lend/Lease from the US in 1943, and 35 M4A4 Sherman tanks were acquired under the United States Military Assistance Program between 1943 and 1944.

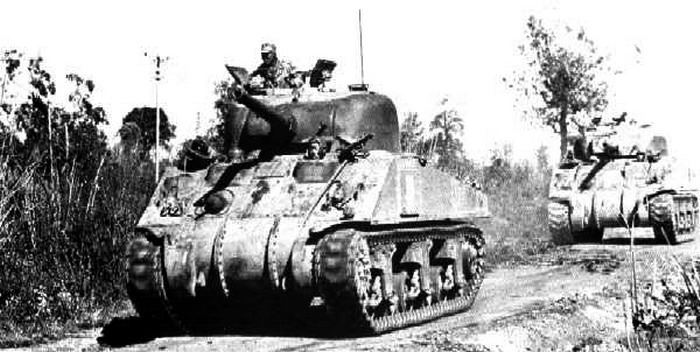
M4 Shermans.

Upon the American entry into the war in 1941, it began to supply China with AFVs which the Soviets were unable to provide. M3 Stuarts and M4 Shermans trickled in through Burma and formed part of the several well-equipped, well-trained armies that the Nationalists could deploy. These units were responsible for stopping numerous Japanese attacks during the later phases of the war.

The 200th Division also saw action in the Burma Theatre under Joseph Stilwell; it participated in the Battle of the Yunnan-Burma Road in 1942 in the Burma campaign. The 200th Division distinguished itself in fighting in the Battle of Toungoo, and Battle of Hopong - Taunggyi but then suffered a disastrous defeat in the Battle of Hsipaw-Mogok Highway near the end of the campaign as it was attempting to retreat to China. After World War II, the remaining Chinese T-26 tanks equipped the First Armoured Regiment of the Army of the Chinese Kuomintang government, which saw service in East China during the Chinese Civil War (1946–1950) where several T-26 tanks were destroyed or captured by the People's Liberation Army during the Huaihai Campaign in 1949.

=== Post-World War II ===
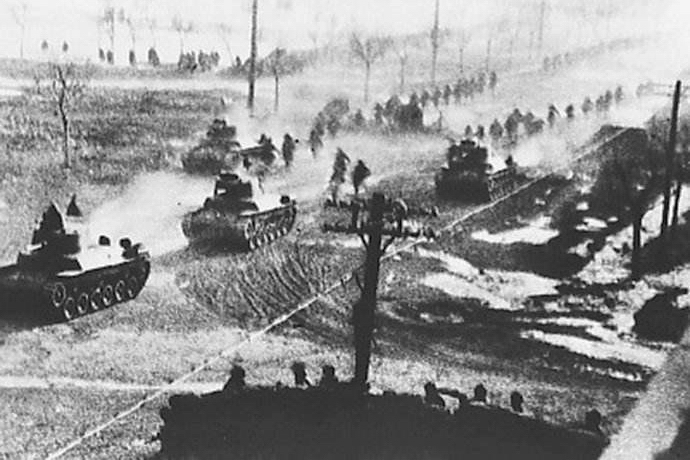
PLA troops and Chinese Type 97 Chi-Ha tanks advance into Shenyang.

The Huaihai Campaign was a military action during 1948 and 1949 that was the determining battle of the Chinese Civil War. It was one of the few conventional battles of the war with both sides using tanks, many captured from the Japanese or American tanks remaining from World War II. This campaign was one of the three campaigns that marked the end of Nationalist dominance in northern China, the other two campaigns being Liaoshen and Pingjin. 550,000 troops of the Republic of China (under the Kuomintang) were surrounded in Xuzhou (Hsuchow) and destroyed by the communist People's Liberation Army (PLA). Gongchen was the designation of a Japanese-built Type 97 Chi-Ha tank which served as the first tank of the PLA.

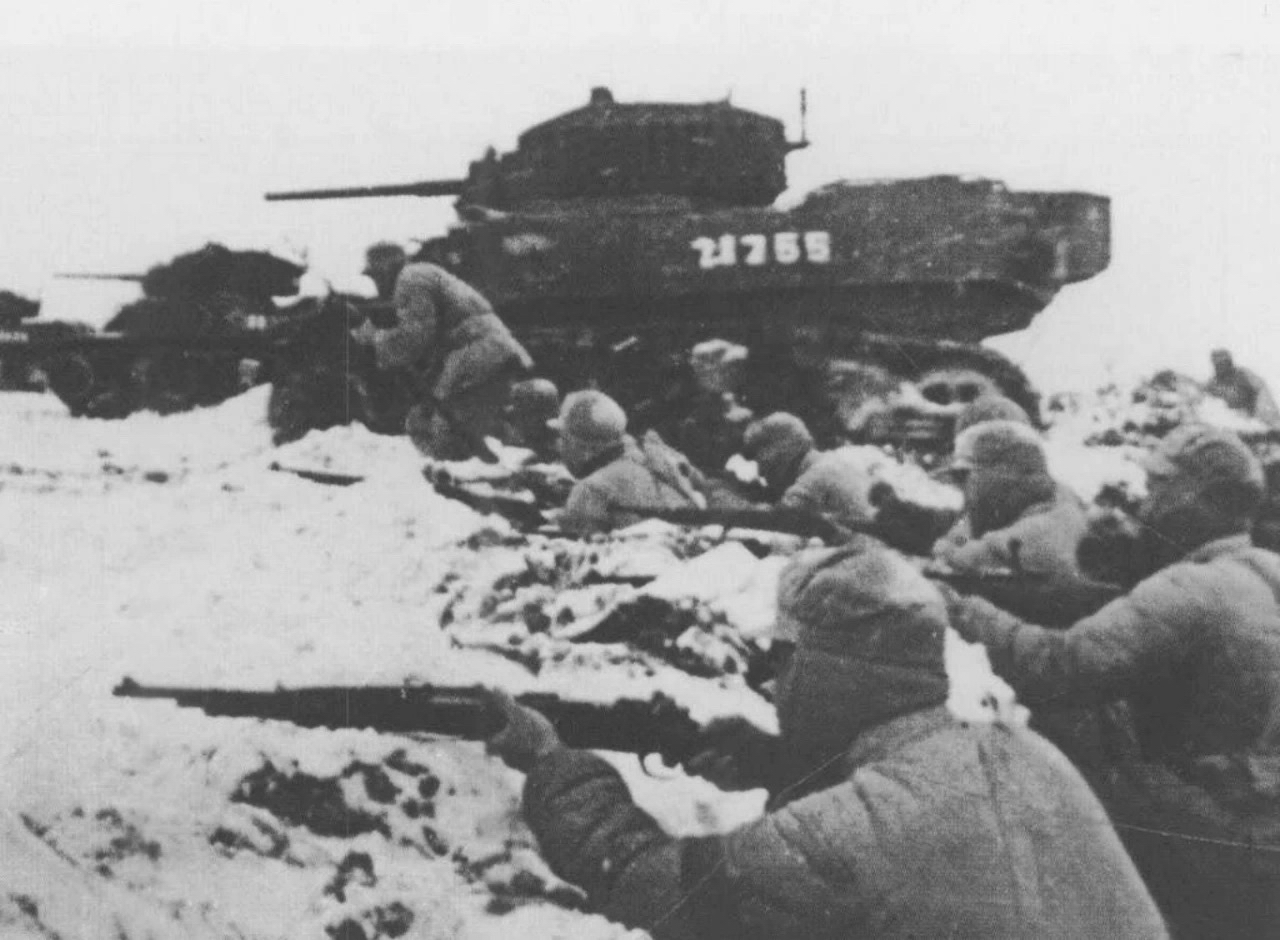
PLA troops, supported by an M5 Stuart light tank, engage Nationalist lines.

The loss of KMT government's best troops and majority of their American equipment meant that they could no longer effectively defend the Yangtze River delta from further Communist attacks. The American government under President Harry Truman completely lost faith in Chiang Kai Shek and the nationalist government, therefore refused to give any further military and financial aid to the nationalists, and hastened collapse of KMT regime on the mainland.

After Tianjin had been captured by the Communists, the Nationalist defenders in Beiping were in a hopeless situation, and the collapse of KMT regime on the mainland to the People's Liberation Army came about. On January 31, the People's Liberation Army entered Beiping to take over. The Pingjin Campaign was over. Beiping, soon to be the capital of the new People's Republic of China, was renamed Beijing.

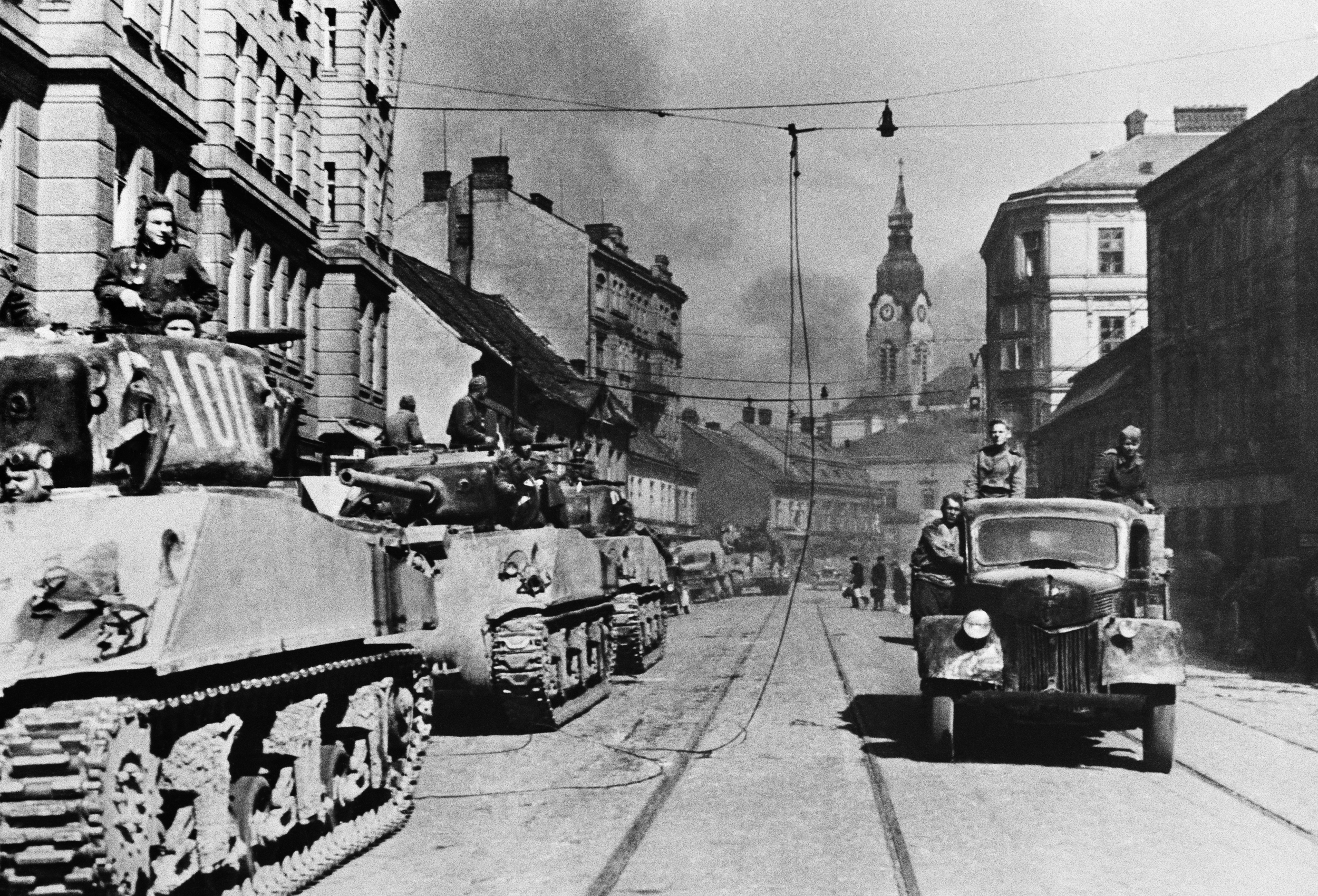
China also received from the Soviets World War II Lend-Lease Sherman M4A2E8 tanks, called "Emcha" with 76 mm with HVSS.

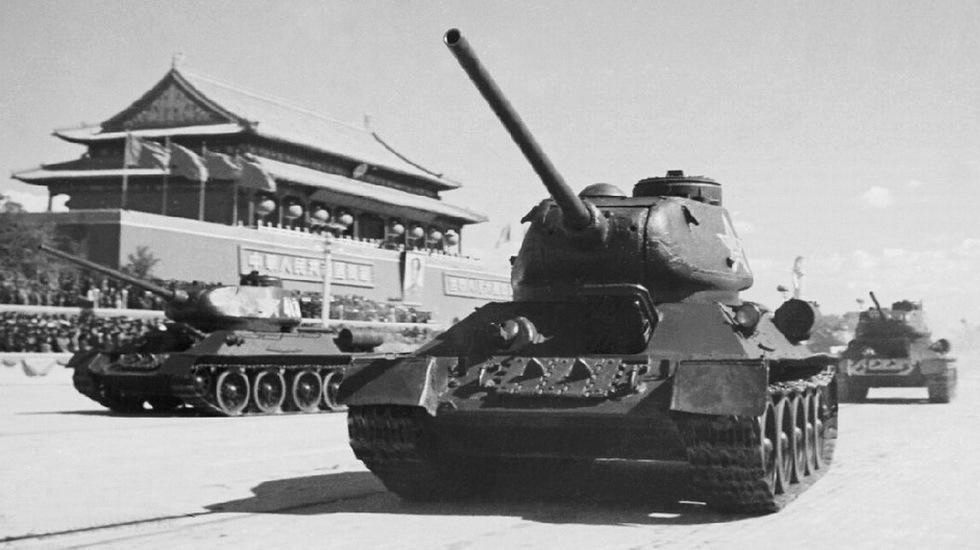
Chinese T-34-85 tank.

In the early 1950s, the Soviet Union gave China 1,837 T-34-85 tanks, along with some surplus Lend-Lease tanks from World War II. The T-34-85 tank also served with the North Koreans and Chinese during the Korean War. The 1954 Operations Research Office report of "Tank v Tank Combat in Korea" said there were 119 definite to possible tank v tank encounters in the Korean War, with US tanks knocked out by T-34s (includes categories of abandoned but repairable) was 38. The Chinese claimed that their T-34s destroyed a number of US tanks late in the war, as by this time most North Korean T-34s, estimated at a little over 400, had been destroyed or captured by November 1950.

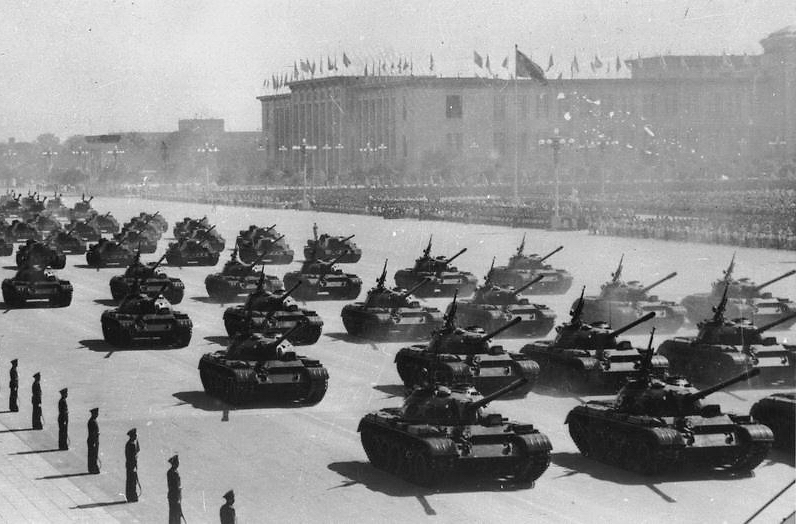
Chinese Type 59 tank.

After the signing of Sino-Soviet Treaty of Friendship, Alliance, and Mutual Assistance, the Soviets agreed to assist China in building a tank manufacturing facility to manufacture the T-54A MBT in 1956. Initially, the tanks were assembled with Soviet-supplied parts, which were gradually replaced by Chinese-made components. The tank was accepted into service by the PLA in 1959, and given the designation Type 59. The Type 59 MBT represented China's first-generation tank development. The Type 59 MBT is also known as WZ-120 by its manufacturer name. It was produced in great numbers from 1959 to the mid-1980s, totaling over 10,000. Over the years, it was upgraded with various domestic and western technologies.

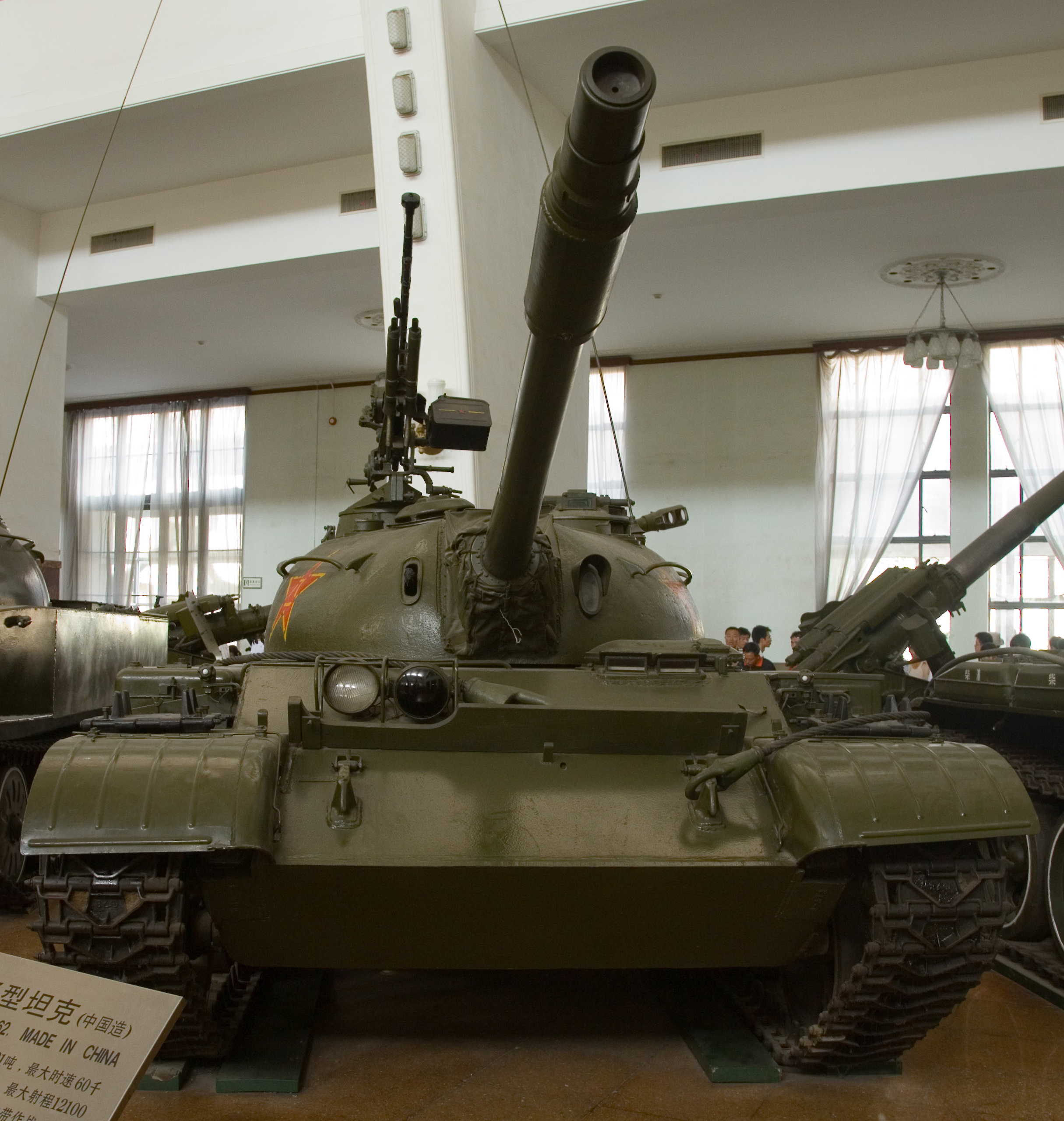
Type 62 light tank.

When the Type 59 main battle tank was being developed it became apparent that because of the high weight of the tank it would have difficulties operating in areas of southern China. These areas mostly consist of mountain ranges, hills, rice paddy fields, lakes and multiple rivers which many times are without a bridge or with bridges that could not withstand the weight of Type 59 main battle tank. Therefore, in the late 1950s the PLA Ground Force submitted requirements for a light tank that could be successfully deployed in the areas of southern China. The development of the Type 62 light tank began with 674 Factory (Harbin First Machinery Building Group Ltd) in 1958. The building of the first Type 62 light tank prototype, Type 59-16, began in 1960 and ended in 1962. The tank officially entered production and service with the PLA in 1963. After an unsuccessful attempt at fitting the Type 62 light tank with the turret from the Type 63A amphibious light tank a new turret was designed and fitted on the Type 62. This new variant was designated Type 62G.

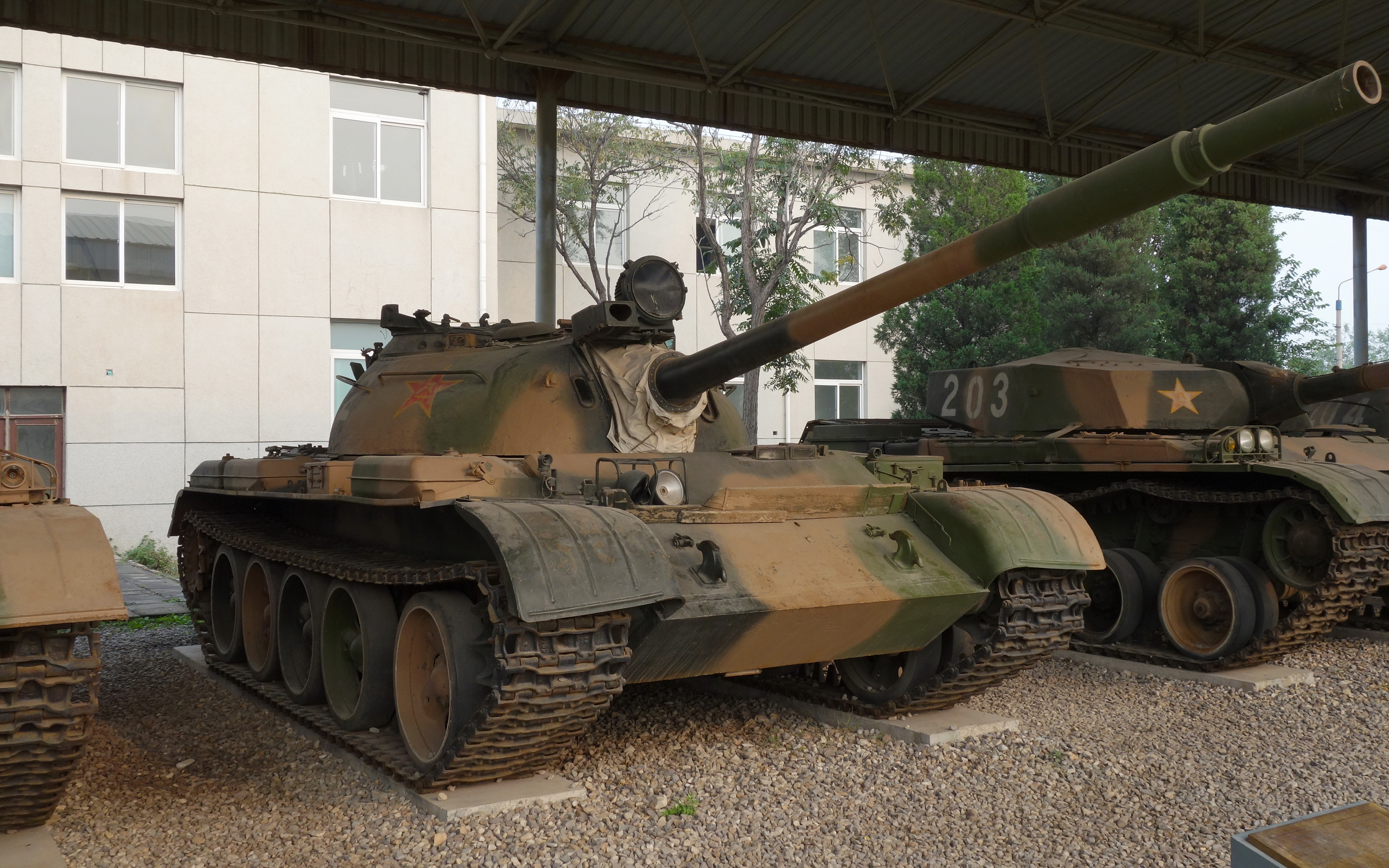
Type 69 tank.

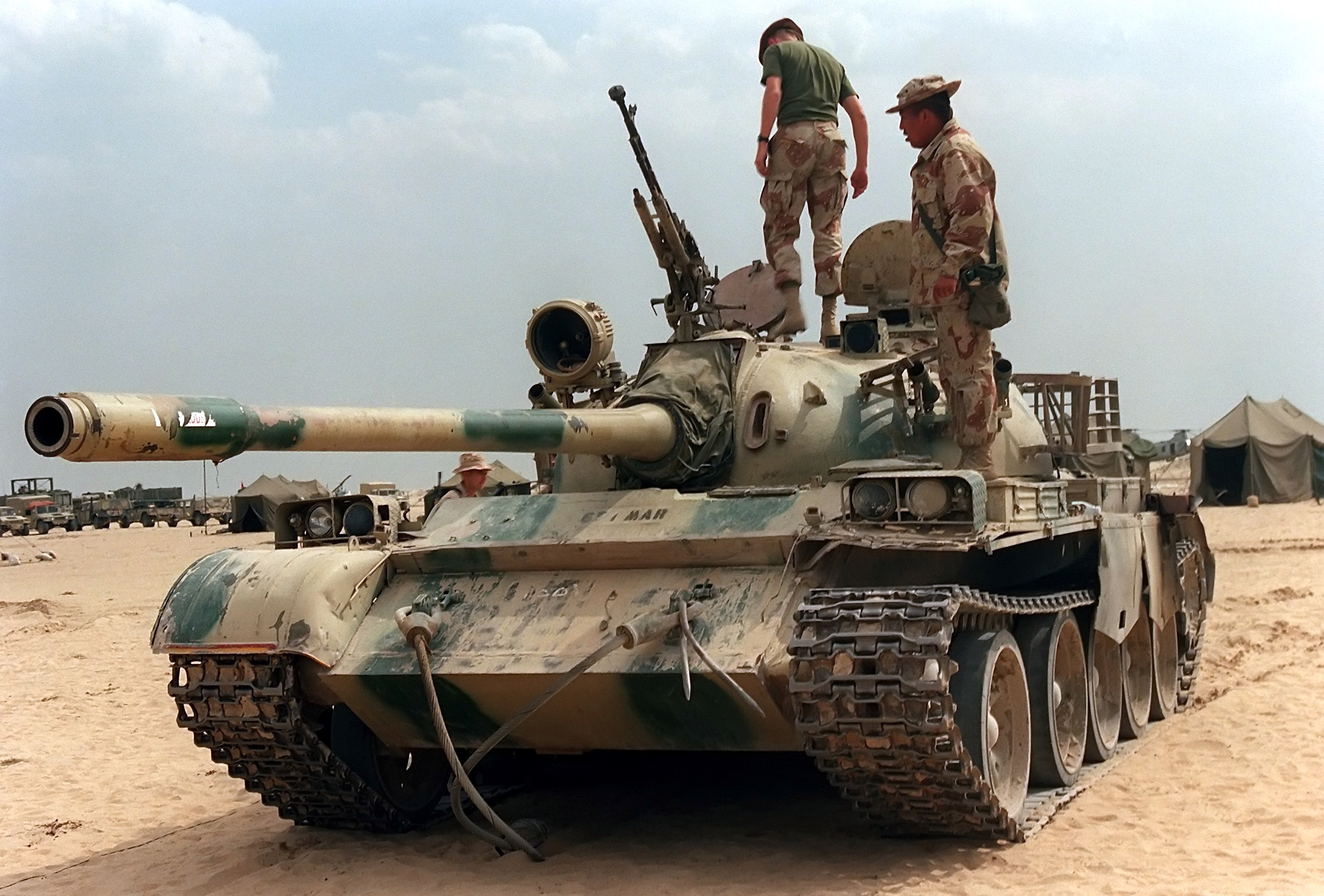
Captured Iraqi Type 69-II during Operation Desert Storm, Iraq.

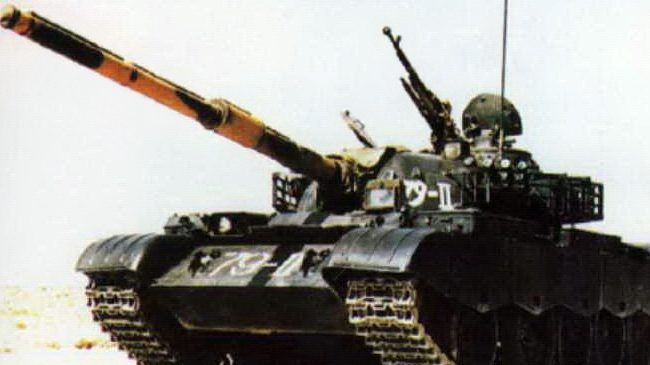
Chinese Type 79 tank.(Type 69-III, WZ-121D).

During the 1969 Sino-Soviet border conflict, China's 617 Factory (now Inner-Mongolia First Machinery Group Company Ltd.) was tasked with improving the Type 59 design. 617 Factory studied a captured Soviet T-62. tank and some of its components, such as the Luna IR searchlight system, a dual-axis stabilized 115 mm smoothbore gun, and a new 580 hp engine were copied and integrated into the Type 69 design. The Type 69 and Type 79 tanks became the first independently Chinese-developed main battle tank. However, the Type 69 was not formally accepted into PLA service until 1982, and then only in limited quantities. The PLA was unsatisfied with the Type 69's performance, but it became one of China's best armored vehicle exports. Over 2,000 were sold worldwide in the 1980s. Some western analysts incorrectly identified the Type 69 as a Chinese copy of the Soviet T-55, opposed to the Type 59 being a copy of the T-54A.

The simplicity, robustness and low cost of the tanks made them attractive on the export market, and China sold hundreds to both sides during the Iran–Iraq War. Many of the vehicles were later used by Saddam Hussein during the Gulf War and the 2003 Iraq War. Both the Type 69 and Type 79 tanks share almost identical hulls and turrets with the older Type 59. The only difference is that the two more recent tank models have been upgraded with better technologies that were either captured or bought from other countries.

By the 1970s, over 1.5 million troops from both sides were stationed along the Sino-Soviet border. At the time the best Chinese tanks were hopelessly out-matched by newer Soviet designs like the T-62, T-64, and T-72.

Relations between China and the West warmed in the 1980s, and China was able to import some western technologies to improve its weapon systems. The Type 69 was upgraded with western systems such as the British Marconi FCS, and the L7 105 mm gun. The new version received the designation Type 79, which represented the last in China's first-generation tank development. As a result, new tank development was commenced and a new family of tanks that included many sub-families was the result.

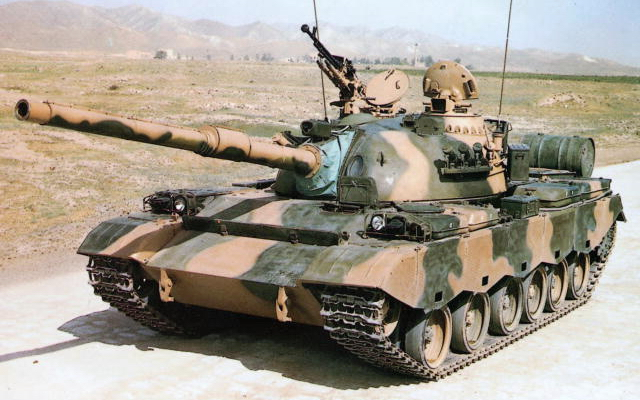
Chinese Type 80 tank.

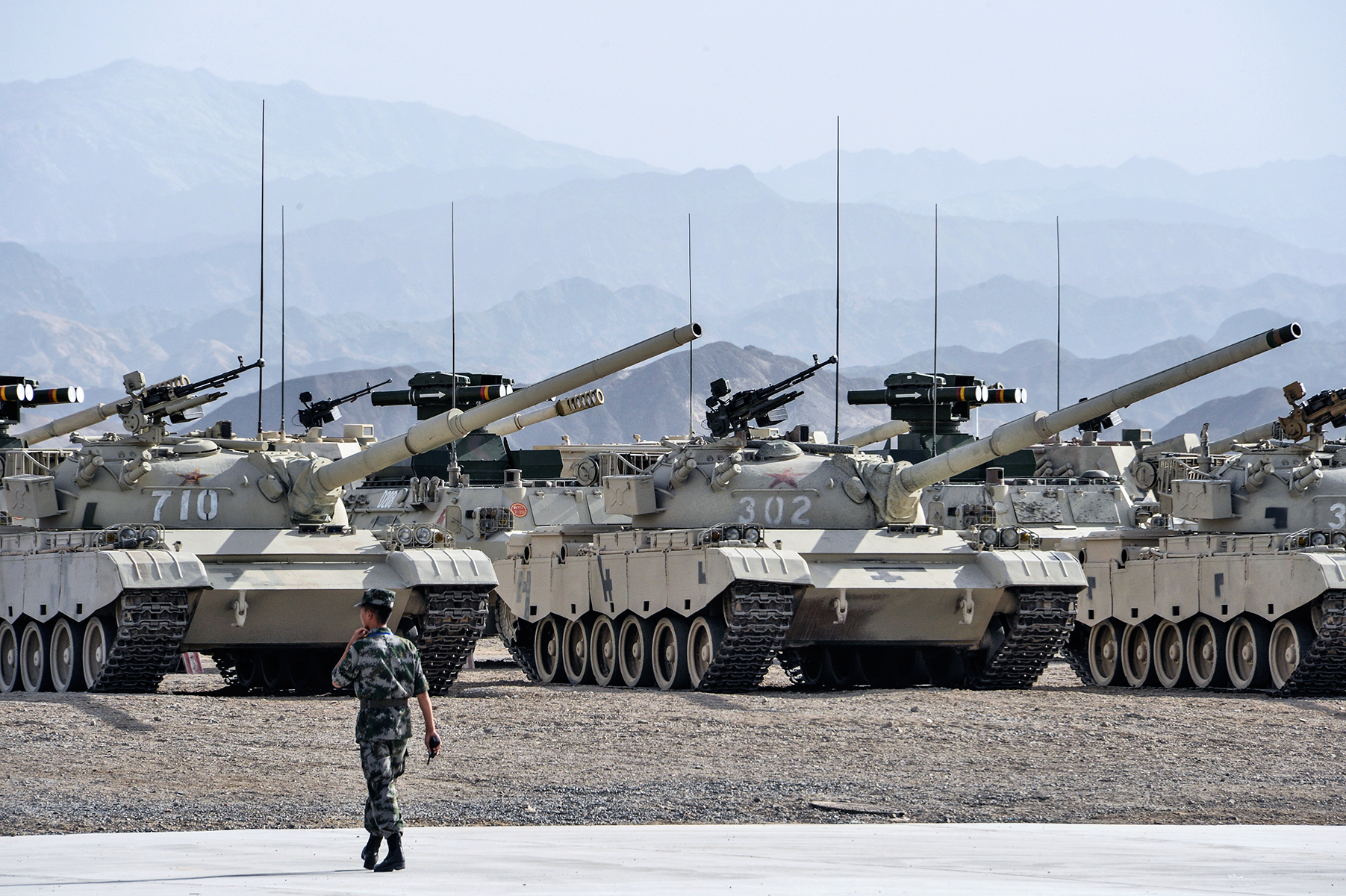
Type 88A tanks

In the late 1970s, China's 617 Factory (main contractor), 616 Factory, 477 Factory, and 201 Institute (now China North Vehicle Research Institute) were ordered to develop China's new second-generation tank. The project benefited from imported Western Technologies in the 1980s. The first Type 80 MBT was based on the older Type 79 MBT hull but equipped with new Chinese-made wheels/tracks, German-designed 730 hp diesel engine, British-designed dual-axis stabilized fire-control with laser rangefinder, and NATO-standard 105 mm gun licensed from Austria. The improved version of this tank later entered service in 1988 under the PLA designation of Type 88. The Type 88 tank is unique in that unlike the rest series of Chinese tanks, this series actually includes versions from different families of earlier tanks. Production of the Type 88-series MBTs was stopped in 1995. The Type 89 tank destroyer was a Chinese armored vehicle that entered service in 1988. Armed with a 120 millimeter smoothbore gun, it was intended to combat newer generations of Western and Russian main battle tanks that were equipped with composite armor and 120 and 125 millimeter caliber guns. Despite a successful development process, with the end of the Cold War it became apparent that the weapon was no longer needed. Production was halted with around 100 examples built.

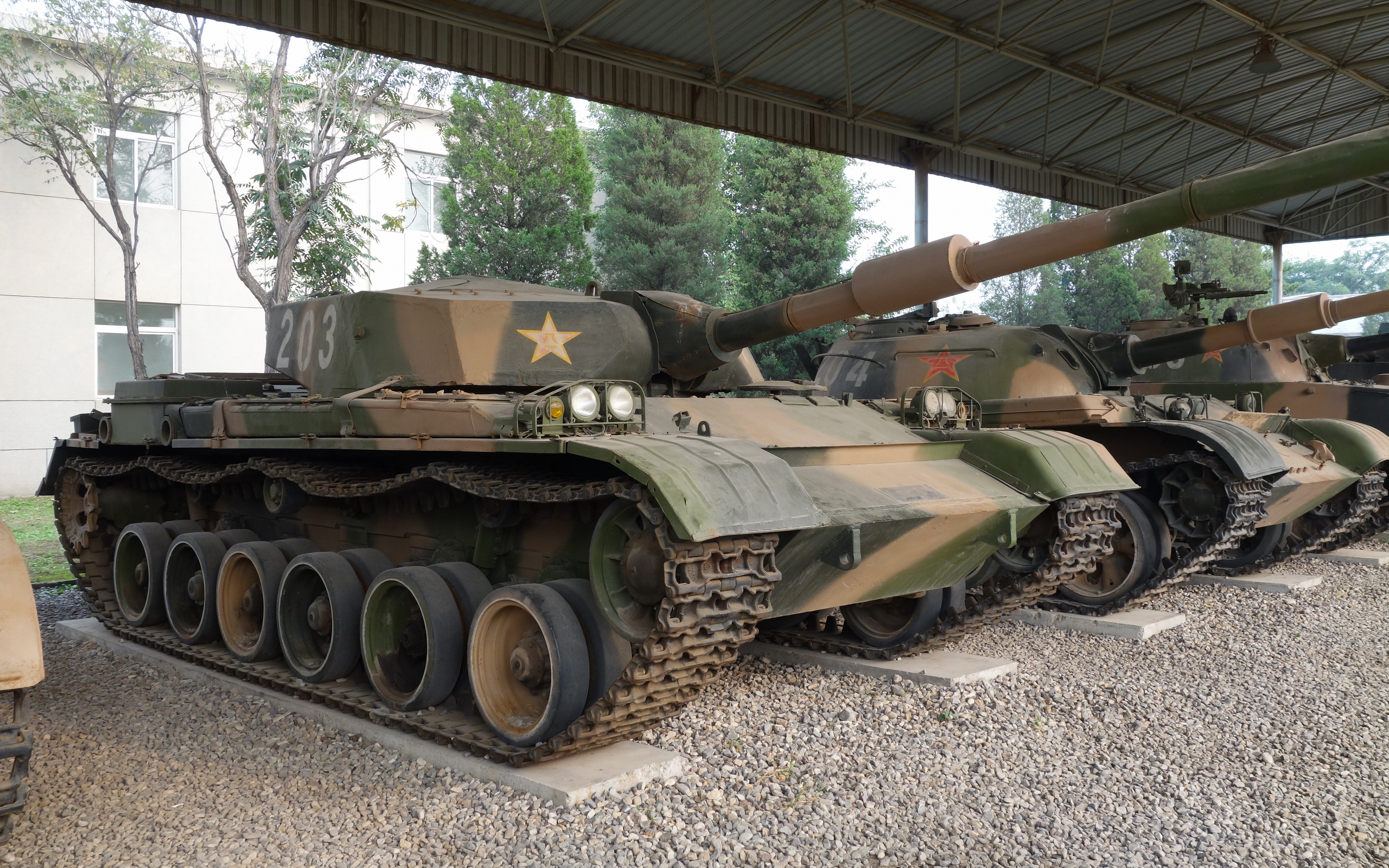
Chinese Storm-1 (Type 85) Tank.

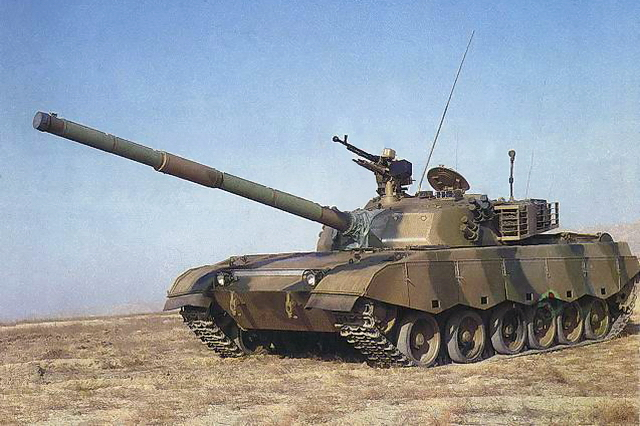
Type 85-IIM Tank

China's North Industries Group Corporation (Norinco), unveiled their own version, the Type 85 MBT in 1988. The PLA did not initially accept the Type 85 MBT, and it was further developed for export to Pakistan (Type 85-IIAP and Type 85-IIM.) This was drastically changed later on when China obtained Soviet T-72 samples in the late 1980s (reportedly from Iran with captured Iraqi samples.) South Africa had discovered along with the Chinese that not only could the western origin 105 mm guns of the Type 80 tank defeat the armor of a T-72 tank, but that the main gun of T-72 could also easily defeat the armor of not only the Type 80 but all armor of Chinese tanks as well. Improvement of the current tanks in PLA inventory was needed, and this was later further illustrated during the 1991 Gulf War, when the PLA observed that their current (1991-era) tanks they exported were vastly inferior to Western MBTs. Priorities were given to develop a third-generation tank, and as well as improving the existing second-generation design. As a result, the Type 85 tank was a direct development of the Type 80.

After further improvements, including incorporating expertise gained from the Type 85-IIM such, this version was accepted by the PLA in 1996, and entered service in 1997 as the Type 96. Production of the Type 88 stopped when the Type 96 became available, and the Type 96 was mass-produced in larger numbers than the Type 88, though sometimes mistakenly referred to as the Type 88C.

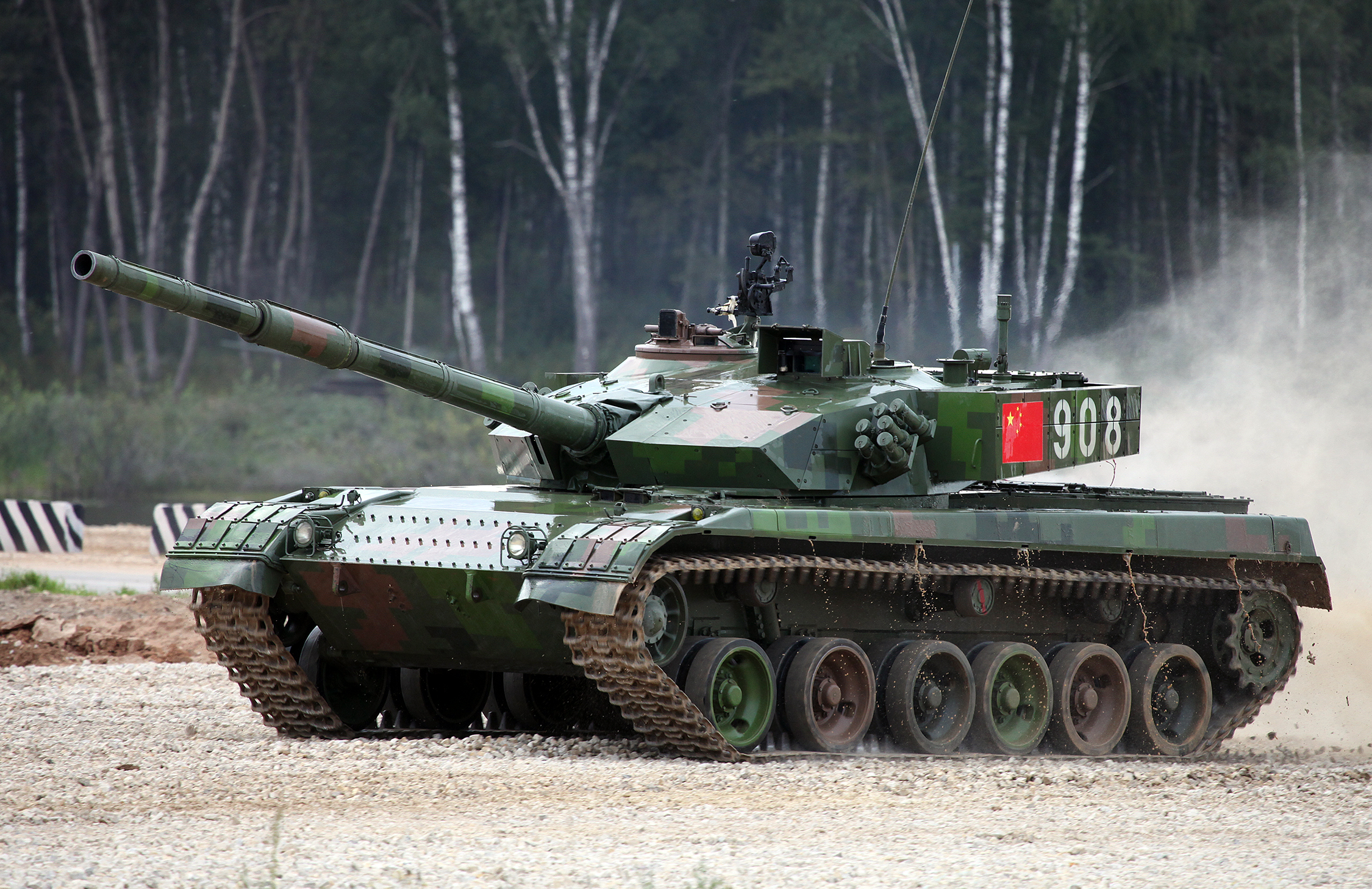
Chinese Type 96A tank.

In comparison to the Type 85 and Type 88, the Type 96 features improved electronics and a western-style turret. Recent photos suggest the Type 96 was heavily modified with add-on armor modules and explosive reactive armor, similar to the Type 99's. Its internal electronics may also have been upgraded to Type 99 standard.

In 1995, NORINCO developed the Type 85-III prototype with a 1,000-hp diesel engine and explosive reactive armor (ERA), features a more powerful engine, after finally solving the engine problem.

After the designation of the Type 80 as the PRC's second-generation tank in 1981, groups emerged within the Chinese military who argued that a third, more advanced tank generation was still needed. Out of these, two main camps emerged. One group argued for a design based on the Soviet T-72, with 3 crewmembers and a 125mm autoloader cannon. The other favored an Israeli Merkava-styled design with a power pack closer to the front of the tank, a 120mm semi-automatic-loading cannon, and a high output diesel or gas turbine engine. The project was delayed for some years because of the division. Finally, in July 1984, the Army settled on the T-72-based design. In the summer of 1986, the plan was submitted to China's State Council and Central Military Commission. It was approved in the same year and incorporated into the Major Weapons Development program of China's Seventh Five-Year Plan.

The Chinese government made a decision to modernize their tank force by incorporating advanced features into their next-generation MBT, as their older tanks were becoming ineffective. The resulting tank had a hull (chassis) similar to the T-72 or T-80 while having a welded turret like most Western tanks. The aim was to create a tank that could defeat the Soviet T-80 and approach the capabilities of the German Leopard 2.

The Type 90 was the first Chinese tank to incorporate the modular design concept for its armor. The next redesign was known as a Type 90-I as the export model for the next generation main battle tank for Pakistan, with a British Perkins Shrewsbury CV12-1200 TCA diesel engine (used in the Challenger 2 tank), and the French SESM ESM 500 automatic transmission (used in the Leclerc). However, the project was abandoned due to the arms embargo following the 1998 Pakistani nuclear tests.

In order to avoid the problem of embargo and reliance on foreign industry, the power plant of the Type 90-I was replaced by the domestic Chinese equivalent and named Type 90-II. However, the result was disappointing, its reliability did not meet the standard in northern China's arid conditions and Pakistan's harsh desert climate.

To overcome the shortcomings of the power-plant in these earlier Type 90 versions, a Ukrainian 6TD diesel was chosen. The final tank design of the Type 90-II was designated Type 90-IIM. Chinese company Norinco showed the new Type 90-IIM during the March 2001 Abu Dhabi Defense Expo, under the export name MBT 2000. The version powered by the Ukrainian engine, intended for domestic production in Pakistan, was named Al-Khalid. The selection was impressive enough that Pakistan decided to adopt this version as its Al-Khalid main battle tank, and 600 tanks were scheduled to be produced in Pakistan by 2007 based on the MBT-2000 which is the upgraded variant of the Type 90-IIM.

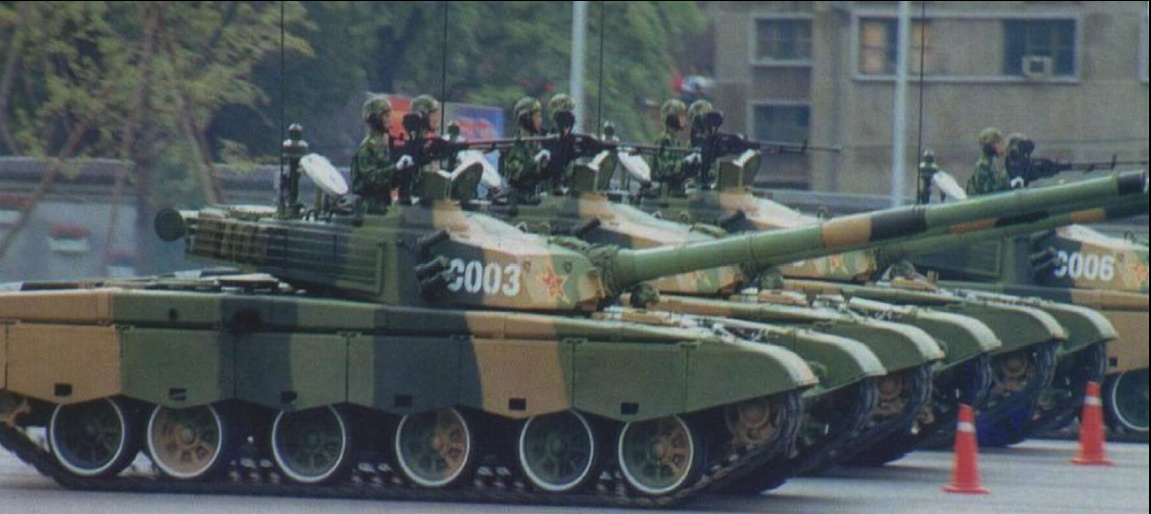
Chinese Type 98 tank.

In the spring of 1989, Norinco signed a contract with the Chinese government to manufacture the Type 99. At the beginning of the following year, its Factory 617 produced the first Type 99 prototype. In 1993, the front armor plating on the Type 99 was increased from 600mm to 700mm to meet government specifications. In August 1994, two prototypes produced by Norinco underwent climate durability tests in southern China. During the tests, the prototypes were driven 3800 kilometers and 200 rounds were fired. In September 1994, reliability and fording tests were carried out in the Tuoli and Huiahuling regions outside of Beijing. Additionally, from 1995 to 1996, three prototypes underwent arctic climate tests in Tahe County, Heilongjiang.

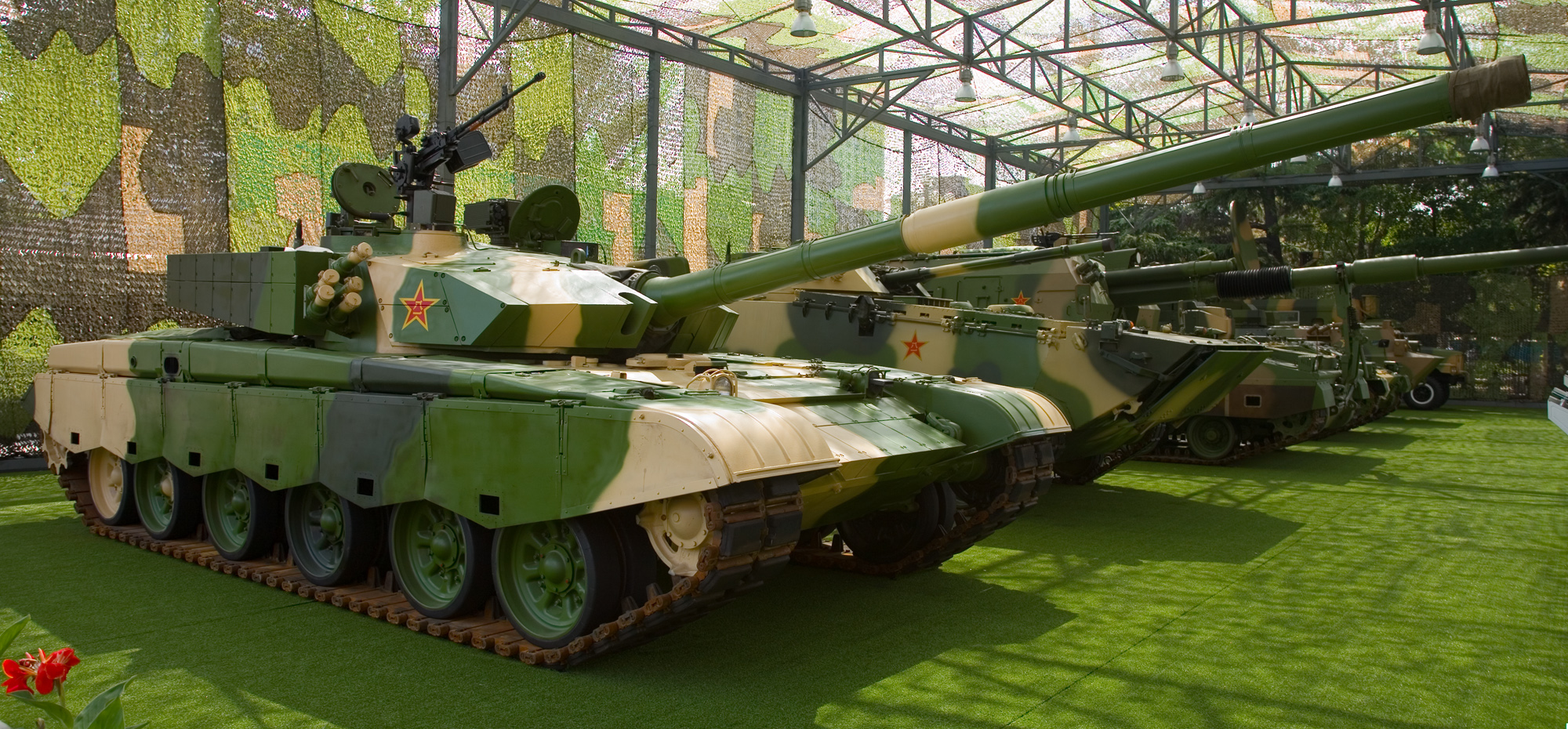
Chinese Type 99 tank.

On March 12, 1996, the Type 99 project formally moved into the final stage of development. In May 1996, Norinco's Factory 617 started the assembly of a finalized prototype. At the end of December 1996, two finalized prototypes were again transported to Tahe for further arctic testing. Within the two-month testing period, the prototypes were driven a total of 6,900 kilometers and 20 government testing programs were completed. At the end of 1997, four finalized prototypes underwent additional testing, traveling a collective 20,000 kilometers and test firing 760 rounds. Finally, at the end of 1999, following over five years of extensive government testing, the design of the T-98(Chinese industrial designation: 9910), as it was then known, was fully completed. Its firepower, control systems, armor and electronics were deemed by the Army to have met or exceeded the project's original goals. Small-scale production of the T-98 was begun in time for the tank to be featured in the PRC's National Day parade in 1999.

Following the completion of the T-98, research into improved versions of the tank continued within the Chinese government. These programs produced the Type 99, a refined iteration of the T-98 with a better reliability record. At the end of 2001, the first batch of 40 Type 99 tanks entered service with the regular Army. The T-98 eventually gave way to what is now known as the Type 99, which was officially revealed by the government in 2001. The final version of the Type 99 included a 1,500 horsepower engine, as opposed to its immediate predecessor's 1,200 horsepower powertrain. Also added were a Leopard 2A5-style sloped-arrow armor plate on the front of the turret, and additional composite armor layers on the sides.

== Overview per tank ==
(Only tanks that were built in significant numbers are listed.) The People's Republic of China has, since its inception, designed and built its own weapons. Many of these designs were of foreign (primarily Soviet) influence, but China is increasingly developing its own indigenous solutions.

From an organizational point of view, China's tank development can be divided into three generations. The first generation is a version of the Soviet T-54A and its derivatives, produced in China as the Type 59 and Type 69/79. The second-generation main battle tank started with the Type 80, which further branched into the Type 88 and Type 96, developed in parallel by different institutes but all funded by China North Industries Corporation (NORINCO). The Third-generation started with the developmental Type 99 prototypes, heavily modified to yield the latest Type 99 tank.

The following is a listing of tanks that were built in significant numbers.

=== Type 59 ===
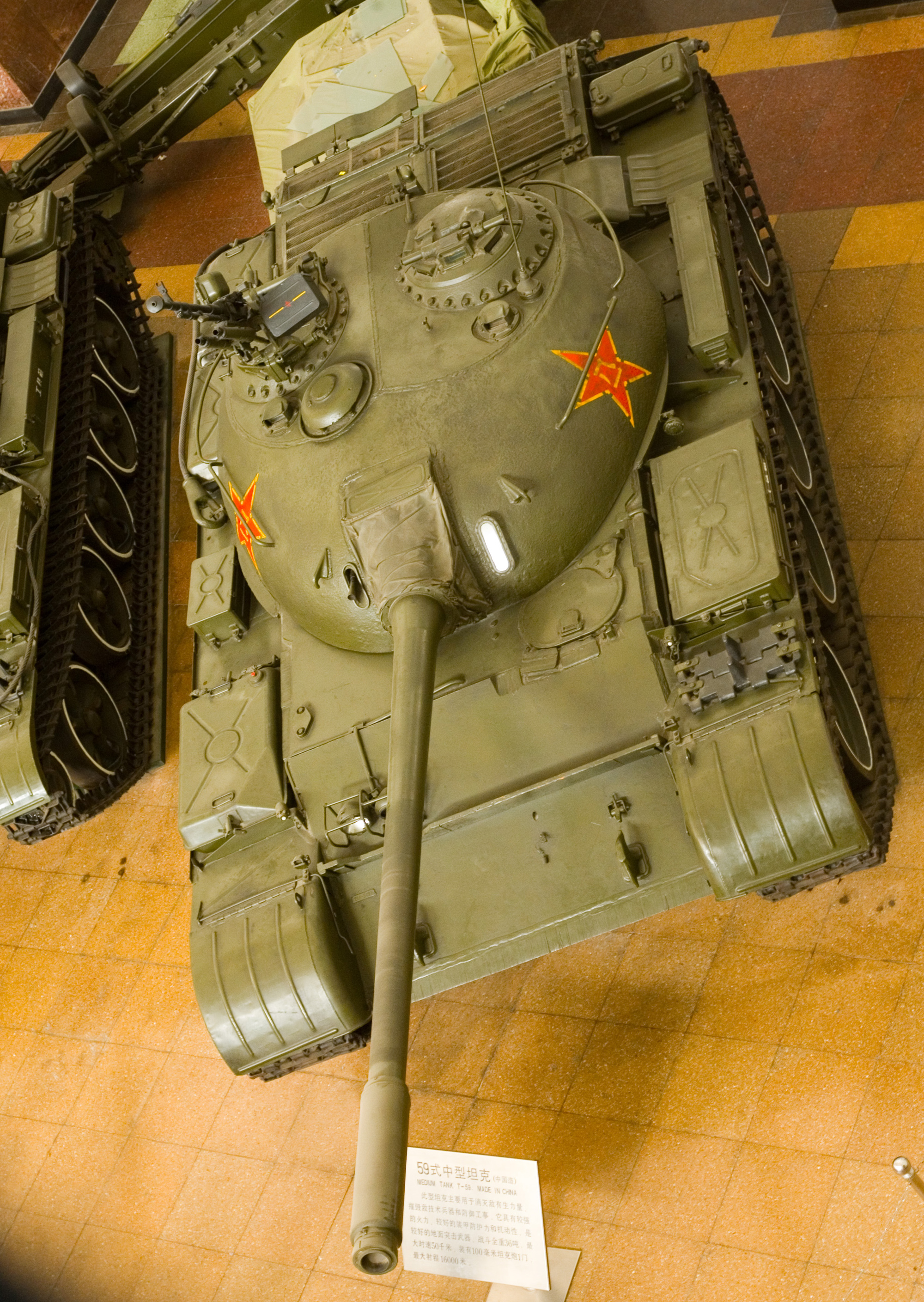
A Type 59 tank seen from above at the China People's Revolution Military Museum.

The Type 59 (Chinese industrial designation: WZ120) main battle tank is a Chinese produced version of the Soviet T-54A tank, an improvement over the ubiquitous T-54/55. The Type 59 was the first Chinese tank ever built.

The first vehicles were produced in 1958 and it was accepted into service in 1959, with serial production beginning in 1963. Approximately 9,500 of the tanks were produced by the time production ended in 1980 with approximately 5,500 serving with the Chinese armed forces. The tank formed the backbone of the Chinese People's Liberation Army into the 21st century, with an estimated 5,000 of the later Type 59-I and Type 59-II variants in service in 2002.

Essentially the Type 59 is identical to the early production Soviet T-54As, however, there are some key differences. The Type 59 was not originally fitted with either the infrared searchlight or main gun stabilization that the T-54 had.

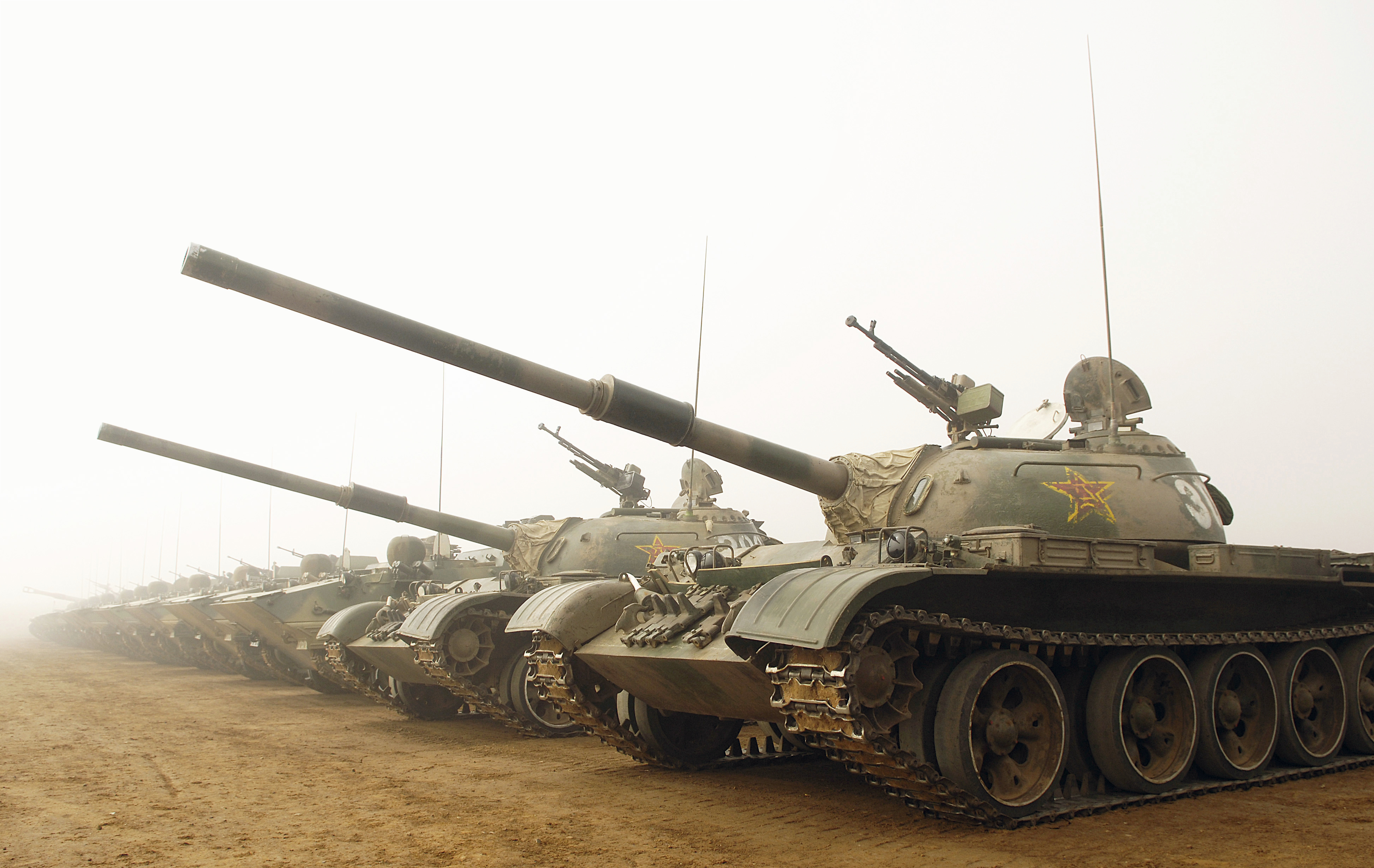
Chinese armoured vehicles at Shenyang training base, with Type 59-II tanks in the foreground.

The Type 59 has a conventional post-war layout with the fighting compartment at the front, an engine compartment at the rear, and a cast dome-shaped gun turret in the centre of the hull. The hull is welded steel varying in thickness between 99 millimeters on the front lower glacis to 20 millimeters on the hull floor. The turret is between 100 and 39 millimeters thick.

The driver sits in the front left of the hull, and is provided with hatch immediately above his seat, which opens to the left. the driver has two pop-up vision blocks which give coverage ahead and slightly to the right when buttoned up. The commander sits in the turret along with the gunner and loader. The commander's hatch is on the turret left, with the gunner sitting forward and below him. The loader sits on the right of the turret and has a hatch above him. The turret has a non-rotating floor, which complicated the crew's operations.

The Type 59 was modified several times during its service with the replacement of the 100 mm Type 59 rifled gun with a 105 mm rifled gun. It was also the basis of several later Chinese tank designs including the Type 69 and Type 79 tanks.

=== Type 62 ===
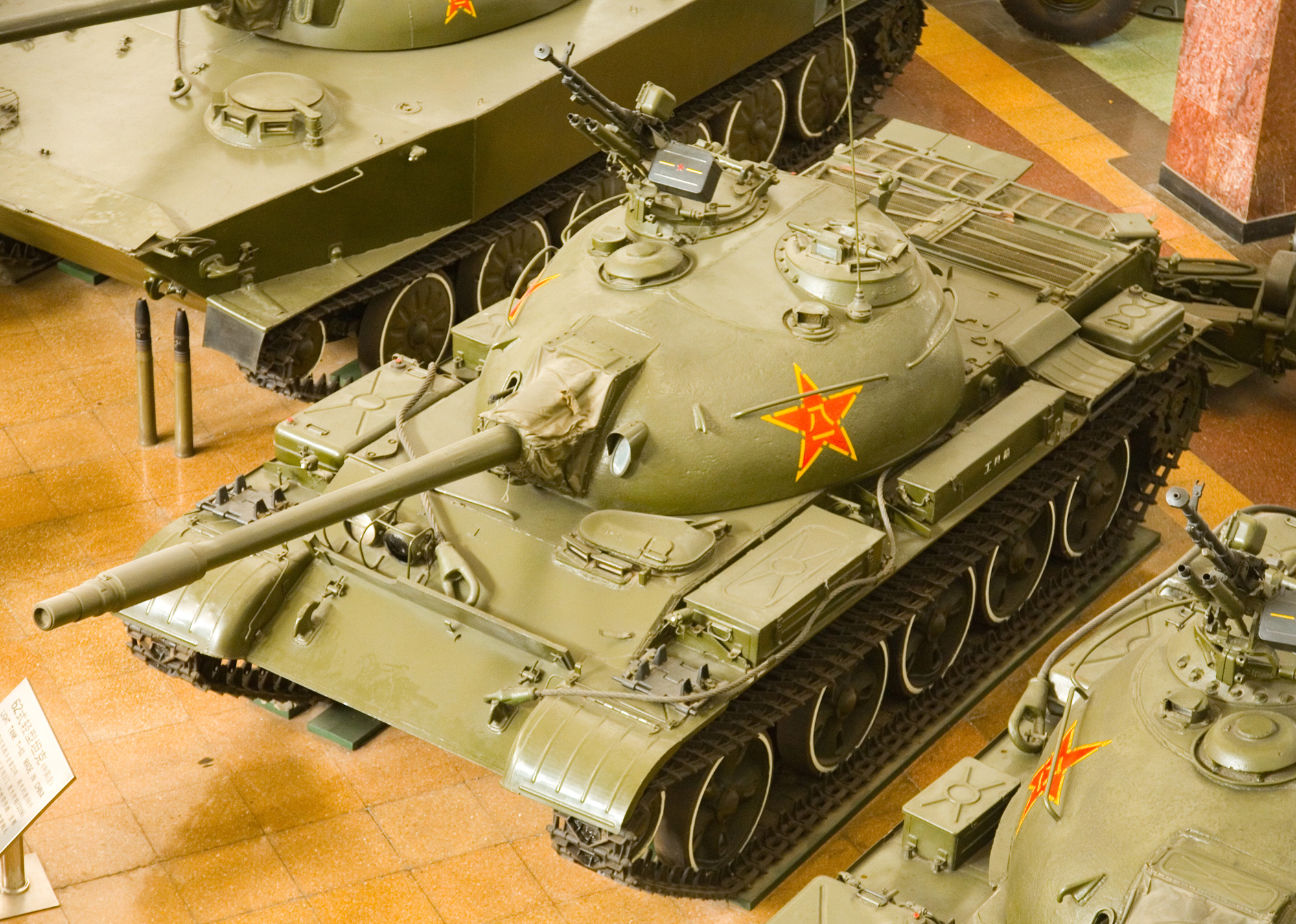
Chinese Type 62 light tank at the China People's Revolution Military Museum.

The Norinco Type 62 is a Chinese light tank developed in the early 1960s and is based on the Type 59 with a reduced main gun caliber, lighter armour and a smaller suite of electronics and other equipment to help reduce weight. It had been upgraded to modern standards to provide the PLA with a dedicated light tank. It is also known under its industrial designation, WZ132. The building of the first Type 62 light tank prototype, Type 59–16, began in 1960 and ended in 1962. The tank officially entered production and service with the PLA in 1963. Based on the experience gathered during the Sino-Vietnamese War an update for Type 62 was designed. It consisted of 33 different improvements and was designated Type 62-I.

After an unsuccessful attempt at fitting the Type 62 light tank with the turret from the Type 63A amphibious light tank a new turret was designed and fitted on the Type 62. This new variant was designated Type 62G.

The Type 62 tank was retired from Chinese service in early 2013.

=== Type 63 ===
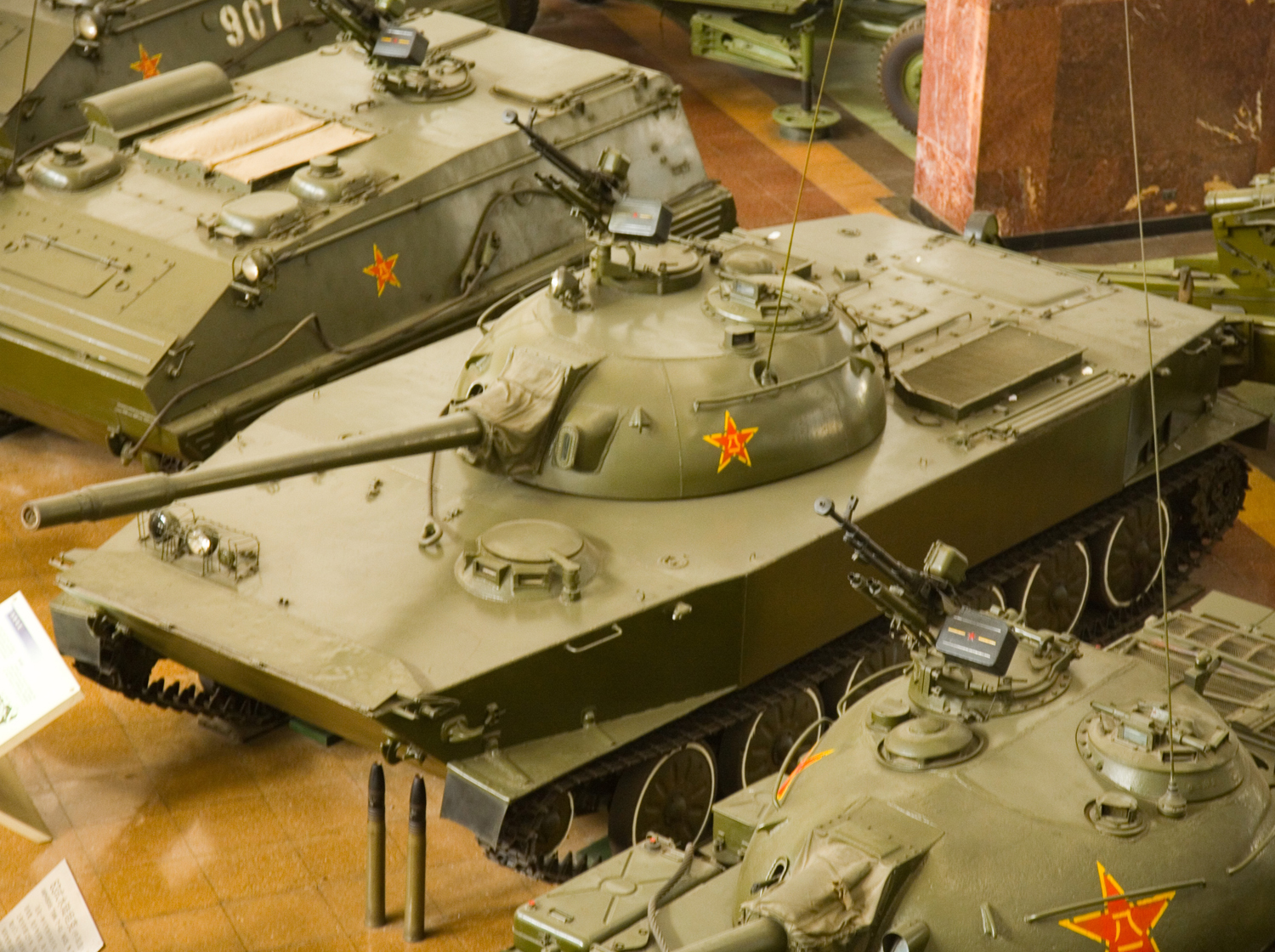
Chinese Type 63 light tank at the China People's Revolution Military Museum.

The Norinco Type 63 is a Chinese amphibious light tank developed in the early 1960s and first fielded in 1963, it was a developed from experience with the earlier Soviet PT-76 which had been produced in China. The Chinese obtained a few PT-76 amphibious light tanks in the mid-1950s. In October 1958, the PLA decided to develop an indigenous amphibious tank based on the PT-76 design. A prototype known as WZ221 (Type 60) was built and tested in 1959, but the design suffered from a number of problems which led to the development of an improved version. It was jointly developed by Military Engineering Institute (MEI) and the No. 60 Research Institute of Fifth Ministry of Machine Building. The prototype was completed in 1962 and after it later passed the extensive trials (mostly dealing with crossing river, lake and sea water obstacles), the amphibious light tank was finally approved for design finalization in April 1963, and was officially designated Type 63. The Type 63 has a typical tank layout: steering compartment at the front, fighting compartment in the center and the engine compartment in the back. Although it is externally similar to PT-76 it has some essential differences from its Soviet equivalent. Instead of a three-man crew on the PT-76, the Type 63 has a four-man crew for better efficiency. The Type 63A (also known as ZTS63A) is upgraded version of the Type 63 amphibious light tank, designed for river-crossing operations at inland rivers and lakes.

=== Type 69/79 ===
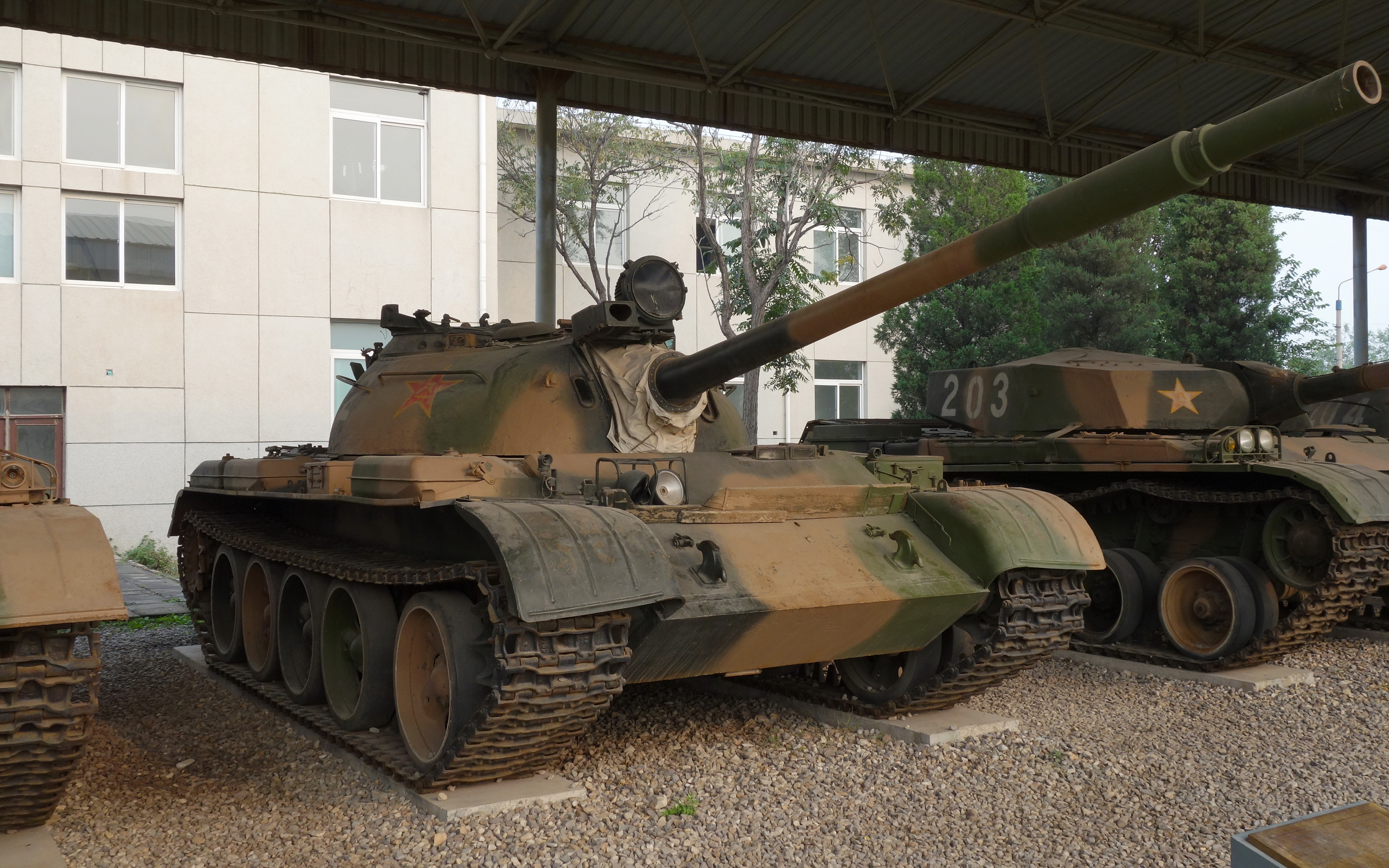
Type 69 tank.

One Soviet T-62 tank was disabled and captured by the People's Liberation Army during the 1969 Battle of Zhenbao Island. The T-62 (No. 545) was hit by a rocket-propelled grenade fired from the Type-56 (Chinese copy of RPG-2) RPG launcher on the morning of 15 March 1969 during a PLA counterattack. On 16 March 1969, the Soviets entered the island to collect their dead. The Chinese held their fire. On 17 March 1969, the Soviets tried to recover the disabled T-62 from the island, but their effort was repelled by Chinese artillery. On 21 March, the Soviets sent a demolition team attempting to destroy the tank. The Chinese opened fire and thwarted the Soviets. The tank was later sunk in the frozen Ussuri (Wusuli) River to avoid being captured and studied by the Chinese Army. On April, with the help of divers of the Chinese navy, the PLA pulled the T-62 tank onshore. This tank was later studied, and the information gathered from those studies was used for the development of the Type 69 main battle tank. The tank was later given to the Chinese Military Museum.

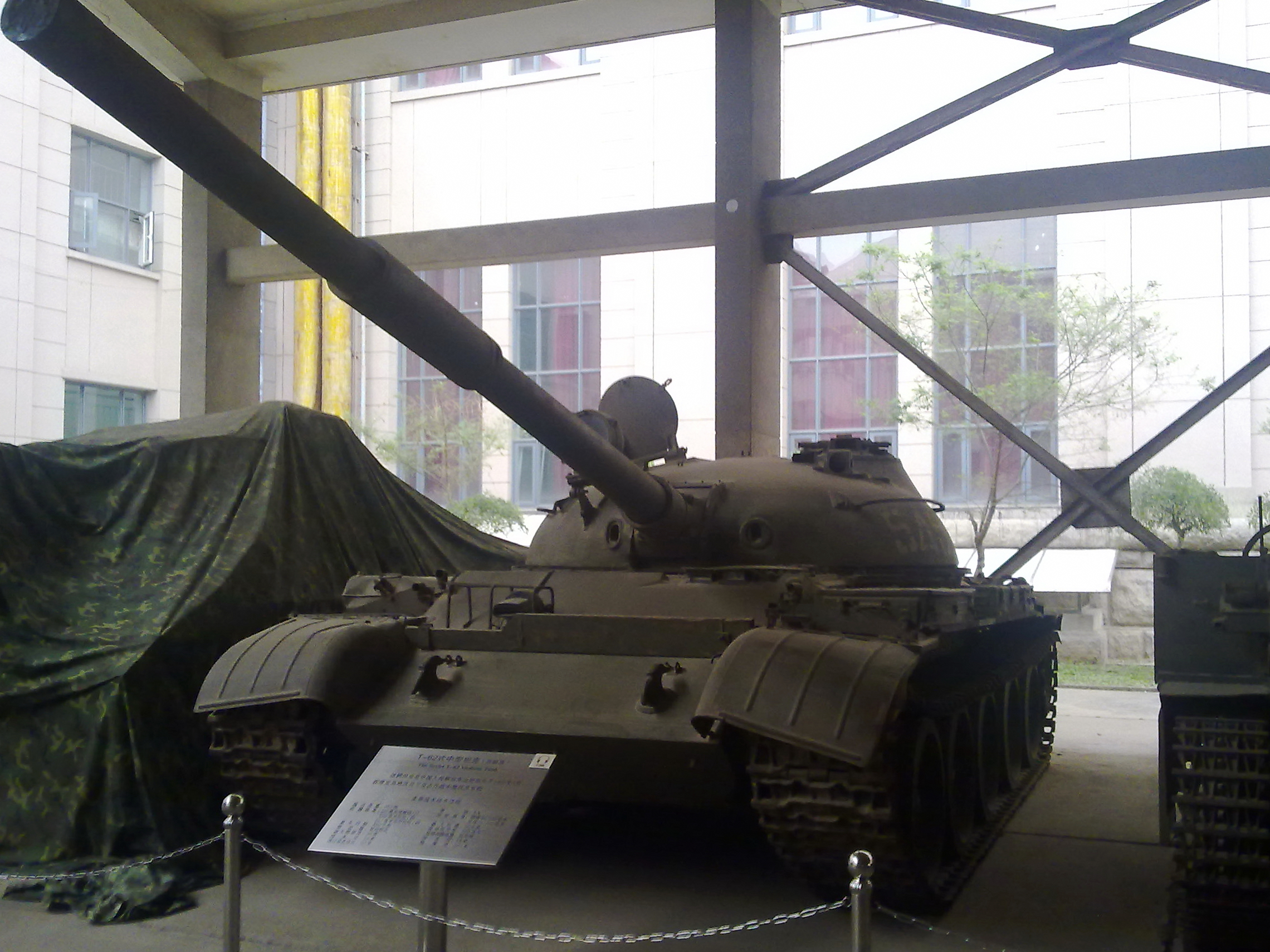
Captured Soviet T-62 tank on display at the Military Museum

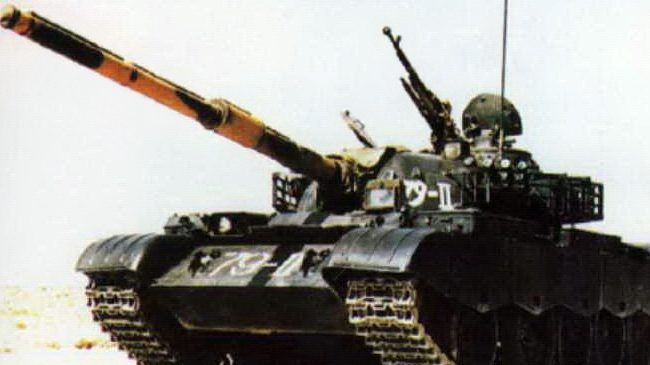
Chinese Type 79 tank variant depicted

The Type 69 (Chinese industrial designation: "WZ121") and Type 79 (Chinese industrial designation: "WZ-121D") are two models of Chinese main battle tanks. Both developments of the Type 59 (based on the Soviet T-54A), they were the first independently developed main battle tanks by China. Their lineage can be seen through the distinct gap between the first and second roadwheels. Other improvements included was equipped with a 100 mm smoothbore gun, a new engine, ballistic computers, and laser rangefinders. However, the early version of the Type 69 were only used in limited quantities. The PLA was unsatisfied, but it became one of China's most successful armored vehicle exports. Relations between China and the West warmed in the 1980s, and China was able to import some Western technologies to improve its weapon systems. The more advanced Type 79 was equipped with a 105 mm rifled gun, also seen on the later Type 80/88 tank. The Type 79 design tank entered service with the People's Liberation Army (PLA) in the 1980s. The tank was followed by the Type 88.

=== Type 80/85/88 ===
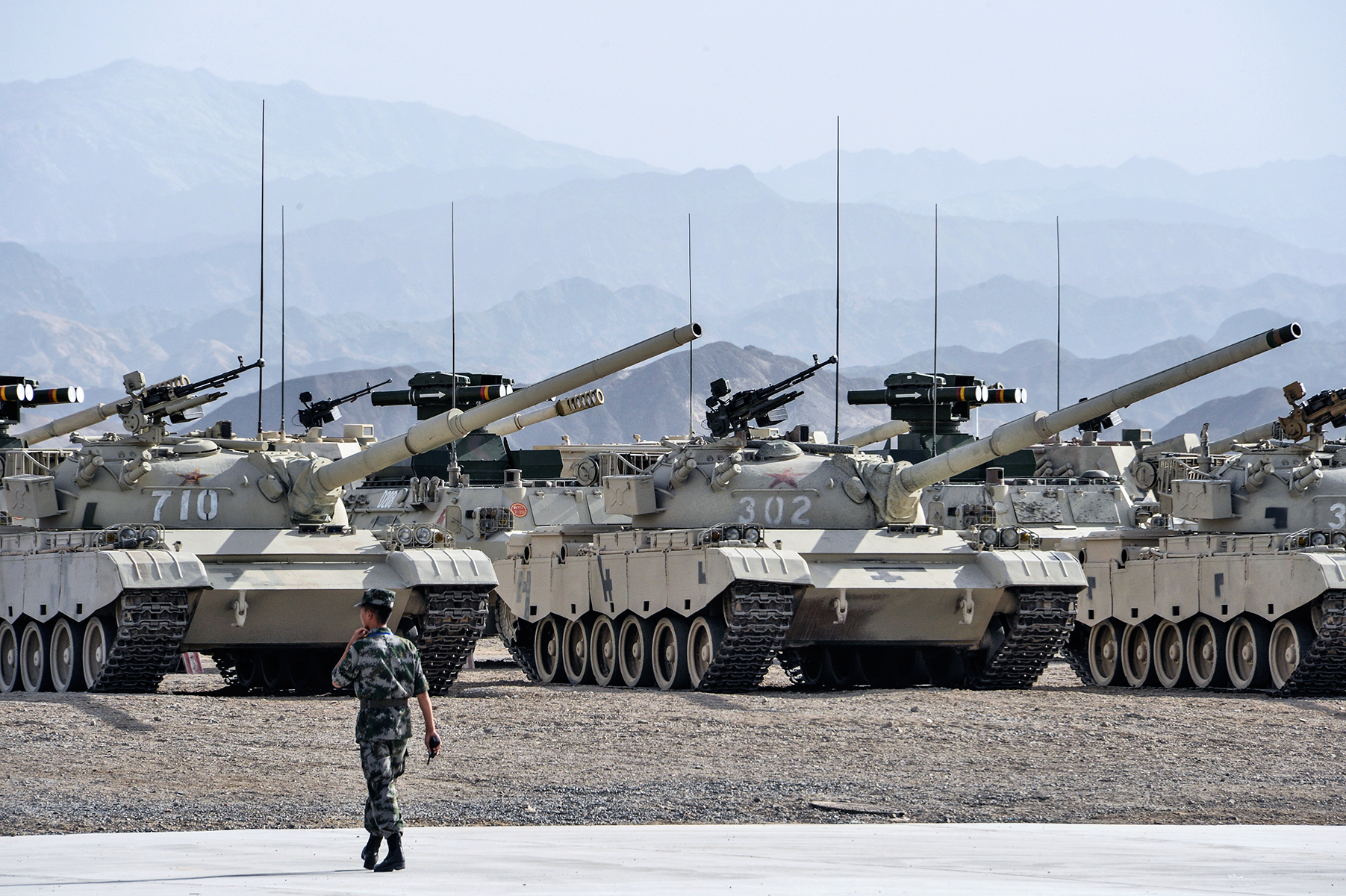
Chinese Type 88A tank

The Type 80 is a series of second-generation main battle tanks (MBTs) from China. The first Type 80 MBT was based on the older Type 79 MBT hull but equipped with new Chinese-made wheels/tracks, 730 hp diesel engine, British-designed dual-axis stabilized fire-control with laser rangefinder, and NATO-standard 105 mm gun licensed from Austria. The improved version of this tank later entered service in 1988 under the PLA designation of Type 88. The Type 88 tank is unique in that unlike the rest series of Chinese tanks, this series actually includes versions from different families of earlier tanks. Production of Type 88-series MBTs was stopped in 1995.

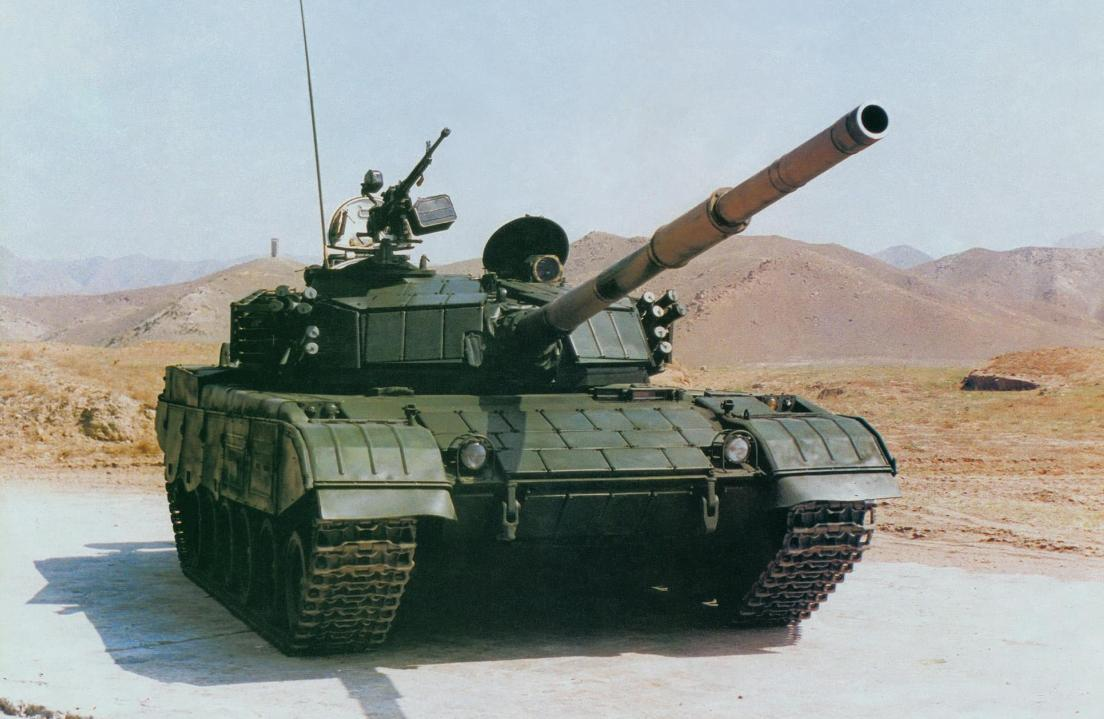
Type 85-III tank

China's North Industries Group Corporation (Norinco), most likely in association with 201 Institute (now China North Vehicle Research Institute), unveiled their own version, the Type 85 MBT in 1988. The PLA did not initially accept the Type 85 MBT, the Type 85 series were prototypes for export, and it was further developed for export to Pakistan (Type 85-IIAP and Type 85-III.) This was drastically changed later on when China obtained Soviet T-72 samples in the late 1980s (reportedly from Iran with captured Iraqi samples.) South Africa had discovered along with the Chinese that not only could the western origin 105 mm guns of Type 80 not defeat the armor of a T-72 tank but that the main gun of T-72 could also easily defeat the armor of not only the Type 80 but all armor of Chinese tanks as well. Production of Type 88-series MBTs was stopped in 1995. The Type 88/85 tanks were further developed into the Type 96.

=== Type 90 ===
The Type 90 MBT was further developed, incorporating advanced features into their next-generation MBT, but besides a few test vehicles for evaluation, this tank was not adopted by the People's Liberation Army, instead, the tank became the export model for Pakistan which developed the MBT-2000 (Al-Khalid) tank based on the Type 90. In the 1970s, the leadership of China's People's Liberation Army was concerned about the Soviet threat and requested an improved main battle tank (MBT). Norinco and the Inner Mongolia First Machine Group Corporation were tasked to develop a series of new tanks.

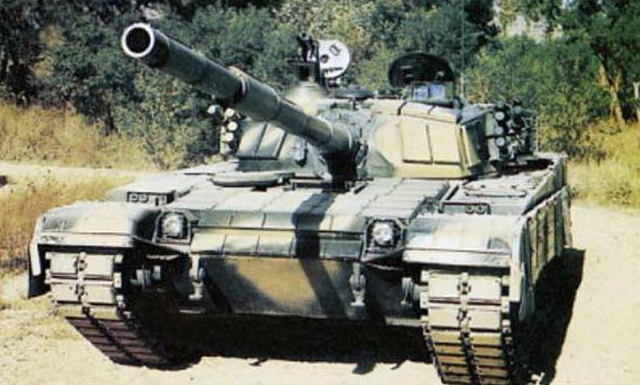
Chinese Type 90-IIM tank

After examining samples of T-72 tanks delivered by Iran in the late 1980s (captured from the Iraqi Army), the Chinese military realized contemporary Chinese tanks were still vulnerable. Design features of the T-72 and some western tanks were used to develop a second generation of Chinese tanks, eventually incorporating a redesigned hull and suspension, a new welded turret and 125 mm autoloaded tank gun. The Type 80 and Type 85 tanks led to the Type 90. The Type 90 was rejected for Chinese service in favour of other designs, but it influenced further development which would lead to China's third-generation Type 99 tanks.

The Type 90 is an evolutionary design: the Type 90-II version shares 10% of its components with the Type 59, 15% with Type 69, 20% with Type 85/88C, and is built with 55% new components. This model was put up for sale on the international market.

This tank was jointly developed by Beijing 201 Institute (China North Vehicle Research Institute) and Inner Mongolia 617 Factory (Inner Mongolia First Machine Group Corporation). The Type 90 is the first Chinese tank to incorporate the modular design concept for its armor. The frontal arc of the turret is a modular design so that when more advanced composite armor is developed, it can readily replace older composite armor.

=== Type 96 ===
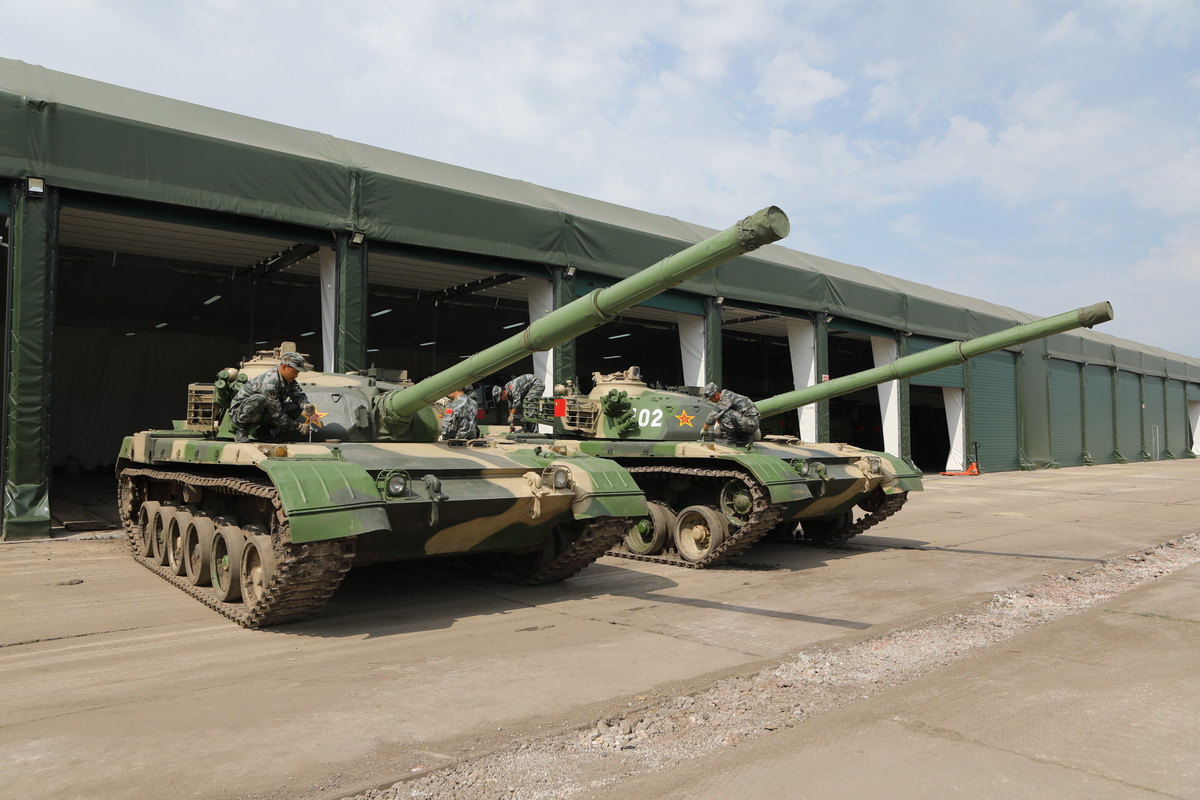
Chinese Type 96 tank

The Type 96 features a more powerful engine, improved electronics and a western-style turret. The Type 96 was developed from a Type 85-IIM prototype with a 780-hp diesel engine and explosive reactive armor (ERA), and expertise gained form the Type 85 such as the modular armor design, this version was accepted by the PLA in 1996, and entered service in 1997. Production of the Type 88 stopped when the Type 96 became available, and the Type 96 was mass-produced in larger numbers than the Type 88, though sometimes mistakenly referred to as the Type 88C.

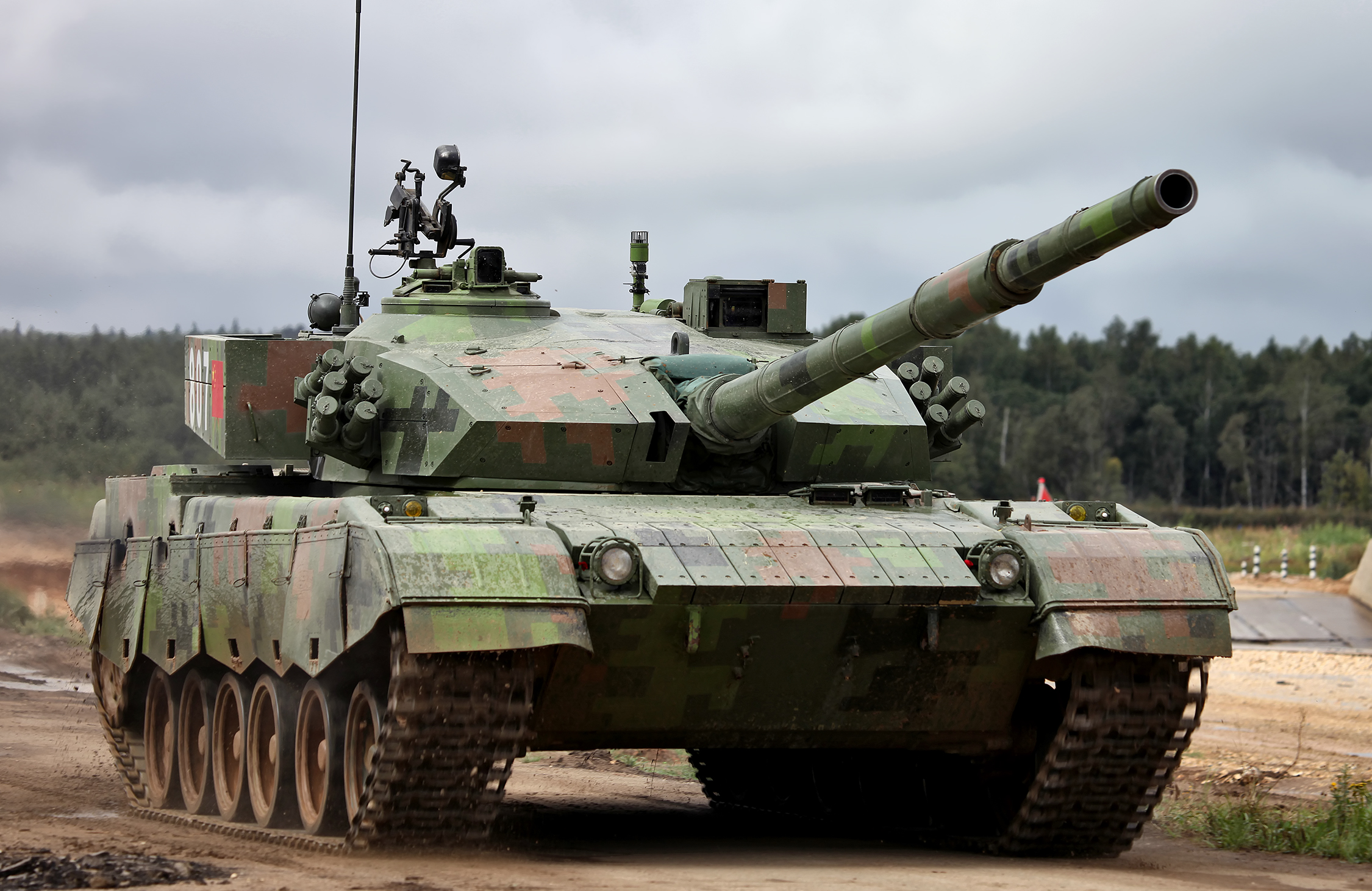
Type 96A tank

Recent photos suggest the Type 96 was heavily modified with add-on armor modules and explosive reactive armor, similar to the Type 99s. Its internal electronics may also have been upgraded to Type 99 standard. In turn, this new upgrade is referred to as Type 96A.

In comparison to the Type 85 and Type 88, the Type 96 features a more powerful engine, improved electronics and a western-style turret. The Type 96 was heavily modified with add-on armor modules and explosive reactive armor in 2005, similar to the Type 99's. Its internal electronics may also have been upgraded to Type 99 standard. Similarly, to the Soviet Union's two-tank strategy with the basic T-72 and higher-technology T-64 and T-80, the Type 96 is likely to become the standardized main battle tank in service with the PLA throughout the decade, while the more advanced and expensive Type 99 is reserved for its elite units.

=== Type 99 ===
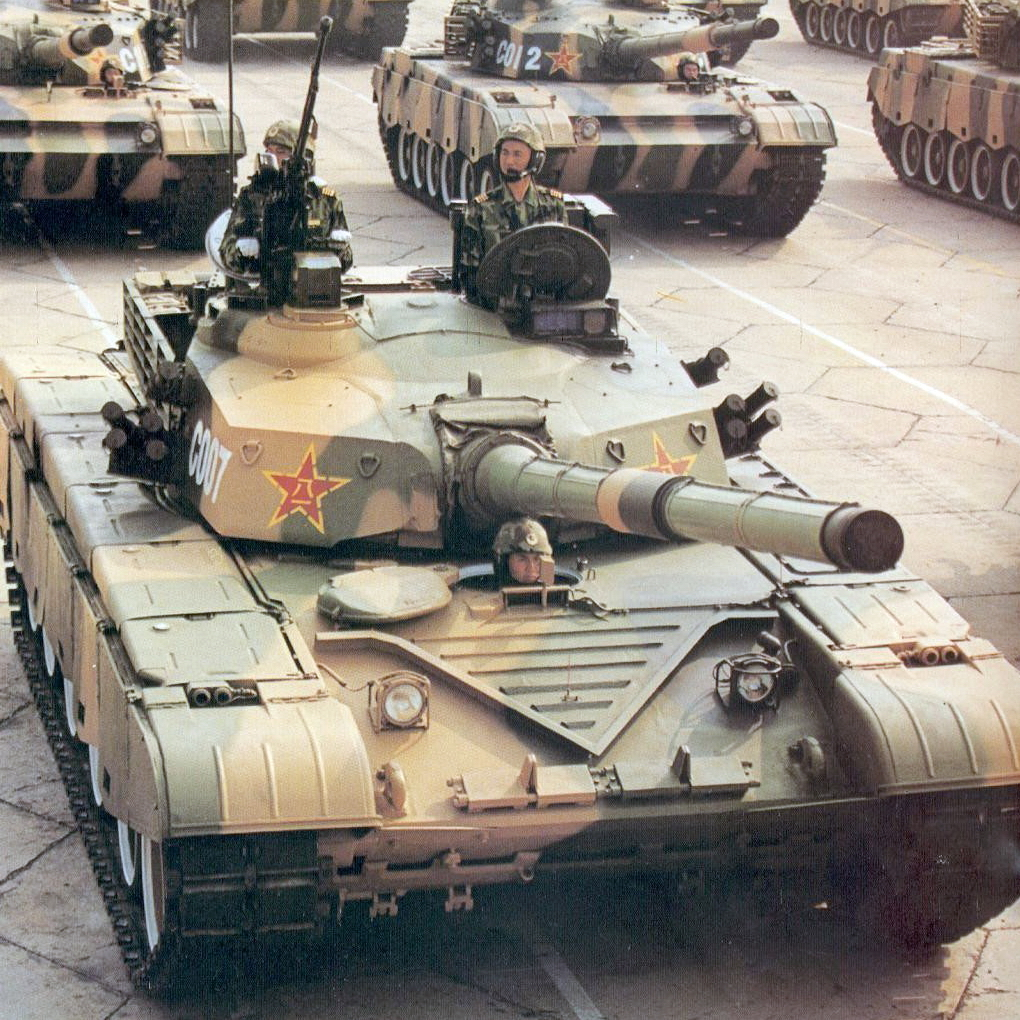
Project 9910 prototype tank seen here in rehearsal for the October 1st 1999 National Day Military Parade.

The 9910 tank (Project 9910 prototype) had a hull (chassis) similar to the T-72 or T-80 while having a welded turret like most Western tanks. The aim was to create a tank that could defeat the Soviet T-80 and approach the capabilities of the German Leopard 2. Small-scale production of the 9910 tank was begun in time for the tank to be featured in the PRC's National Day parade in 1999. Following the completion of the 9910 tank, research into improved versions of the tank continued within the Chinese government, eventually gave rise to next Chinese design, these programs produced the Type 99. At the end of 2001, the first batch of 40 Type 99 tanks entered service with the regular Army.

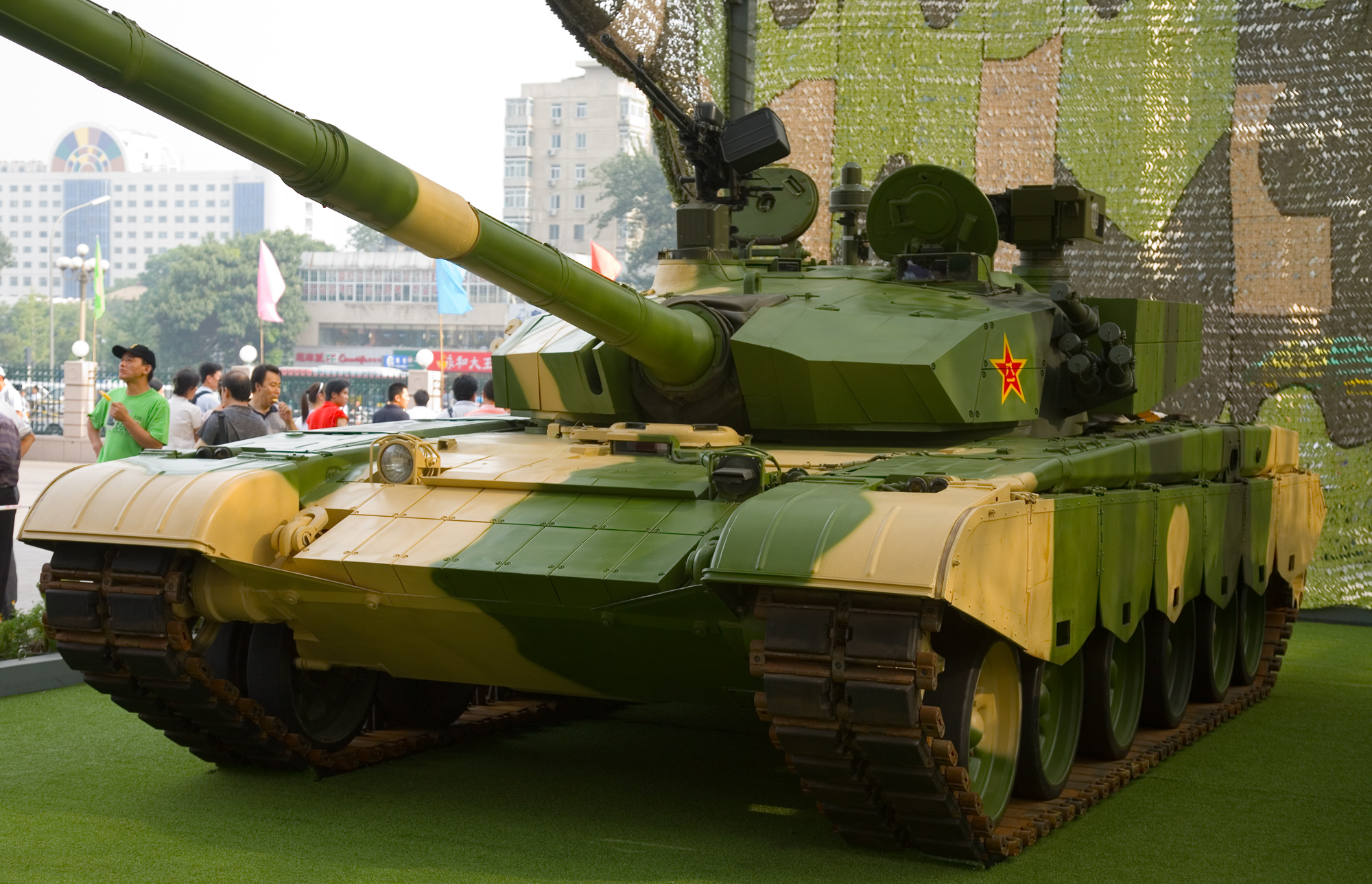
A Type 99 tank at the China People's Revolution Military Museum.

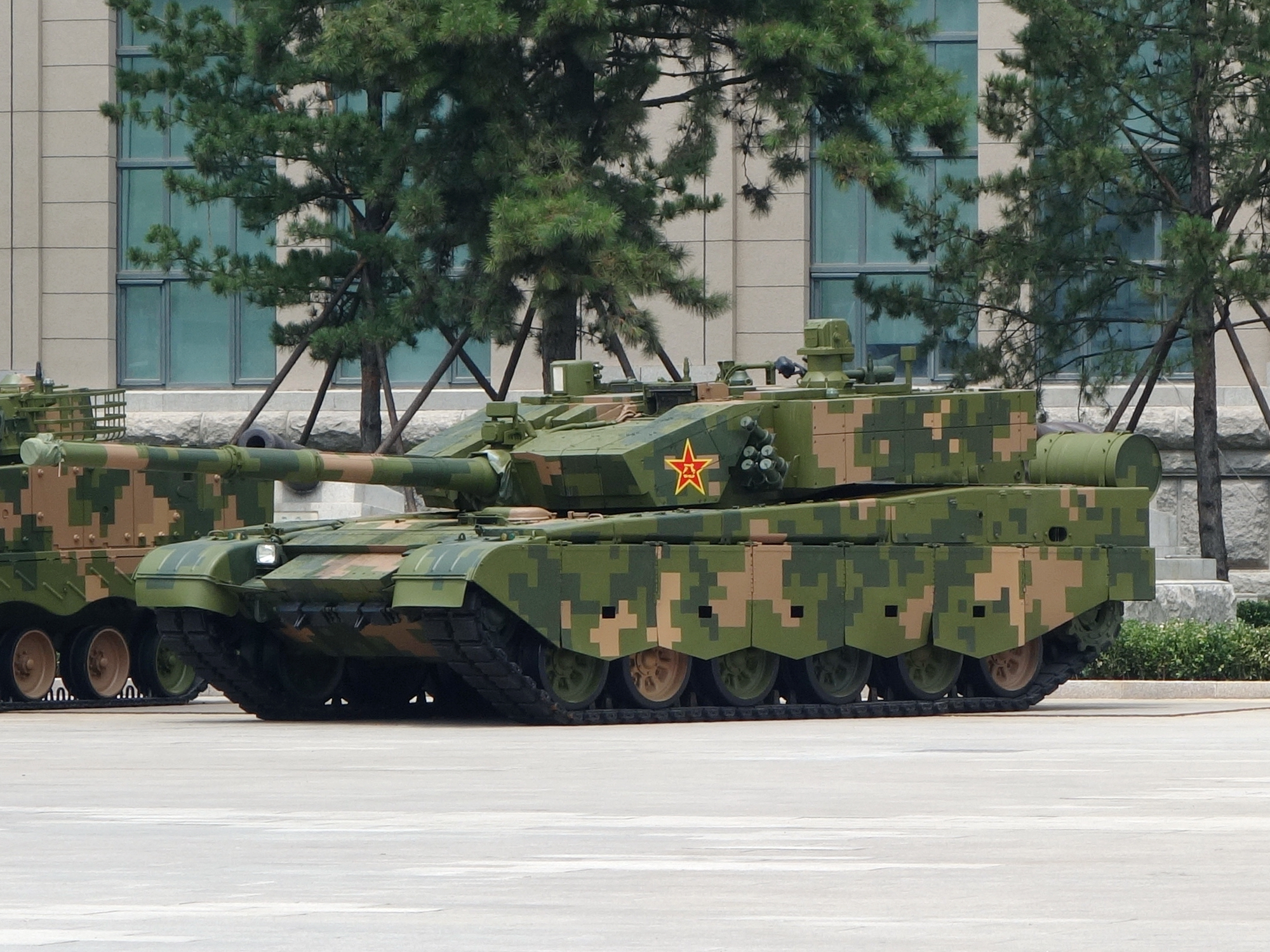
ZTZ-99A tank

The Type 99, also known as ZTZ-99 and WZ-123, developed from the Project 9910 prototype, is a third generation main battle tank (MBT) fielded by the Chinese People's Liberation Army. It is made to compete with other modern tanks. Although not expected to be acquired in large numbers due to its high cost compared to the more economical Type 96, it is currently the most advanced MBT fielded by China and is a successor to the Type 88 tank manufactured for the People's Liberation Army. Three main versions of the Type 99 have been deployed, the Type 99 prototype, Type 99, and Type 99A; Type 99B, incorporating improved weapon system, new active protection system, and advanced electronics.

=== Type 15 ===
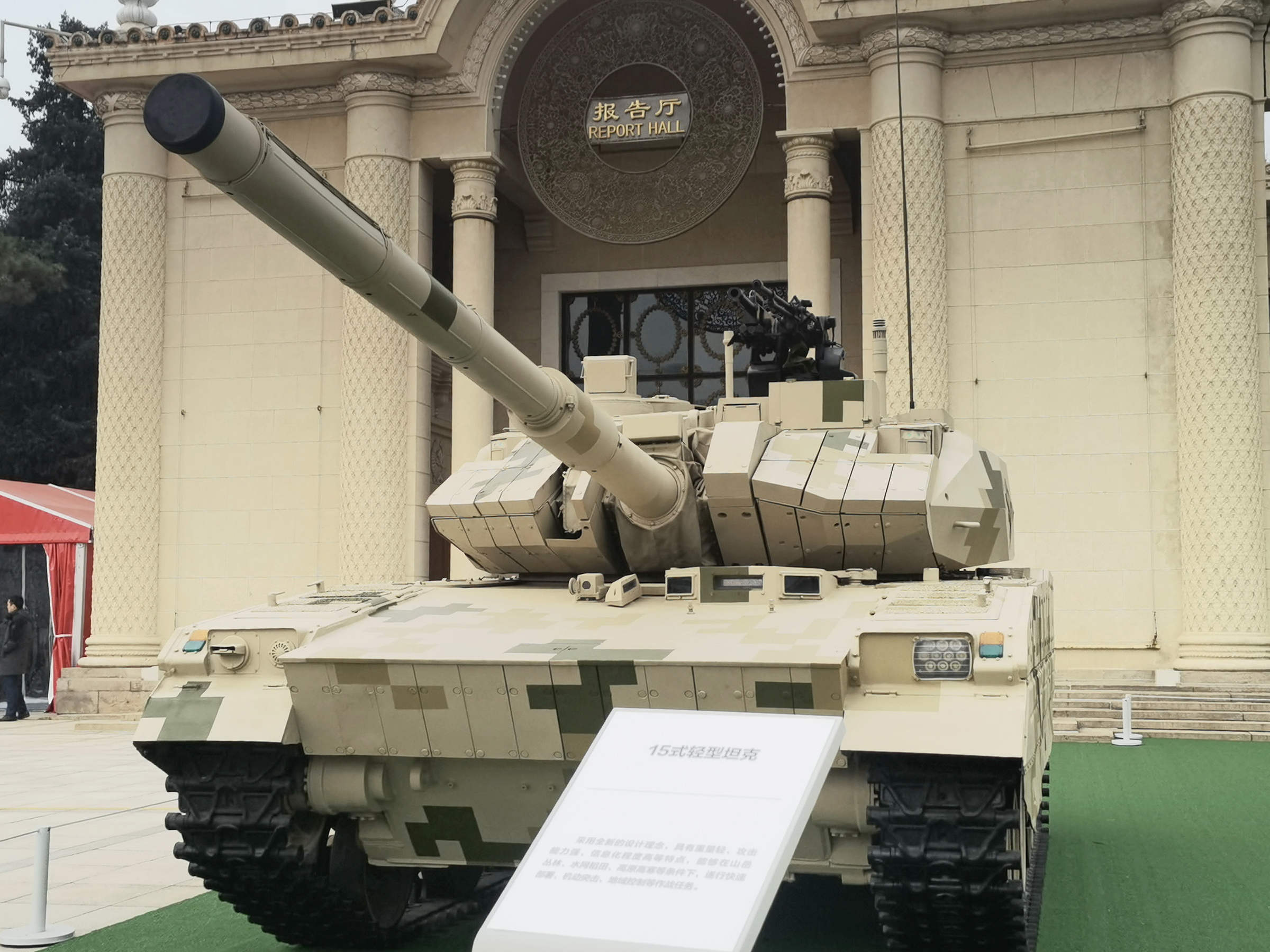
Type 15 tank

The Type 15 is a lightweight main battle tank manufactured by NORINCO. The Type 15 tank's model first appeared in the exhibition Great Change: A Large Exhibition Celebrating the 40th Anniversary of Reform and Opening-up which was held at the National Museum of China during November 13, 2018, and March 20, 2019.

=== Type 100 ===
The Type 100 tank is a Chinese 4th-generation main battle tank. The tank was first officially seen in public in mid-August 2025 during rehearsals for the then upcoming Victory Day Parade to commemorate the 80th Anniversary of the end of the Second Sino-Japanese War and the Second World War, and officially debuted during the actual military parade in Tiananmen Square on September 3, 2025.

== Chinese armored vehicles ==
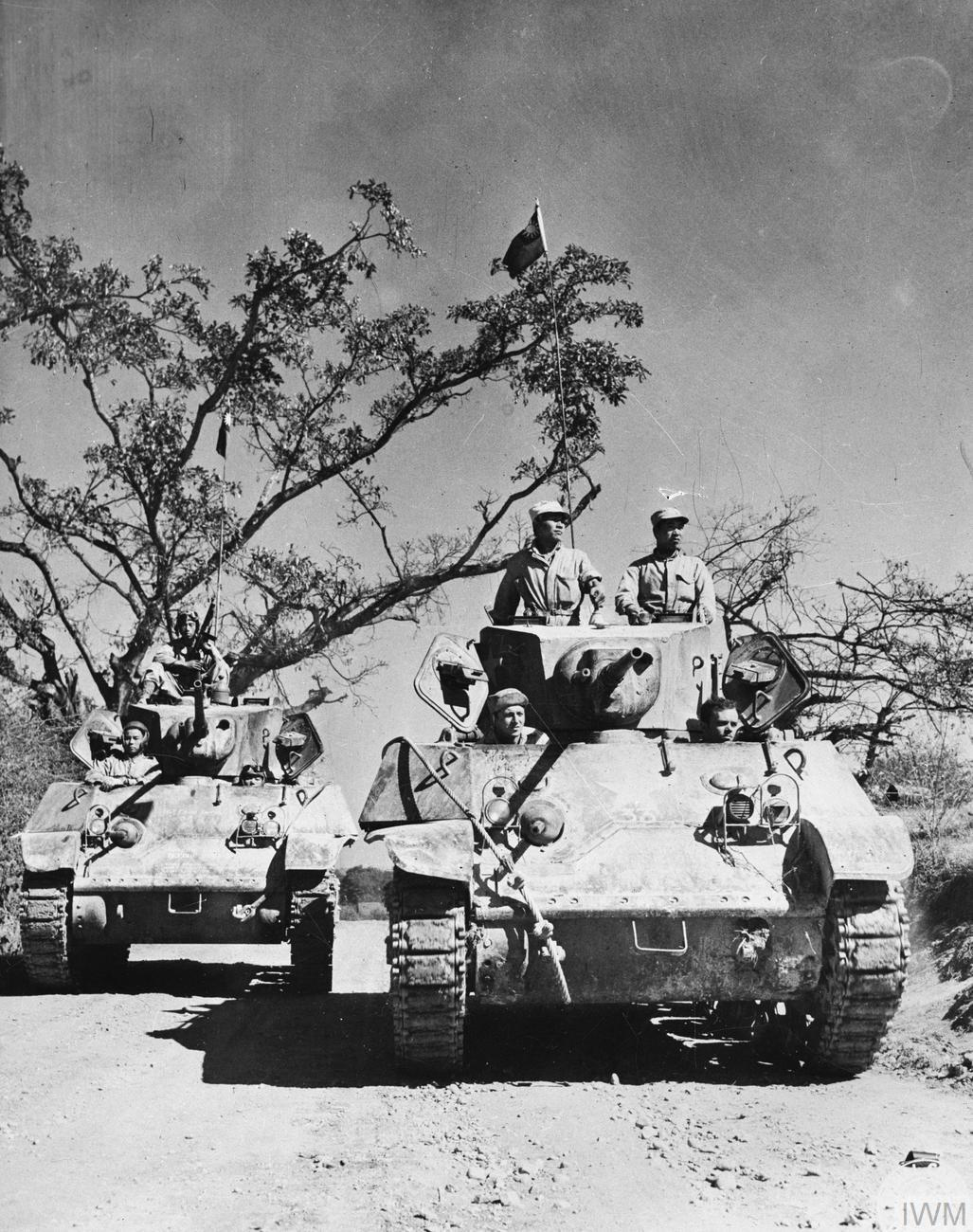
Republic of China army operating the M3 Stuart on Ledo Road

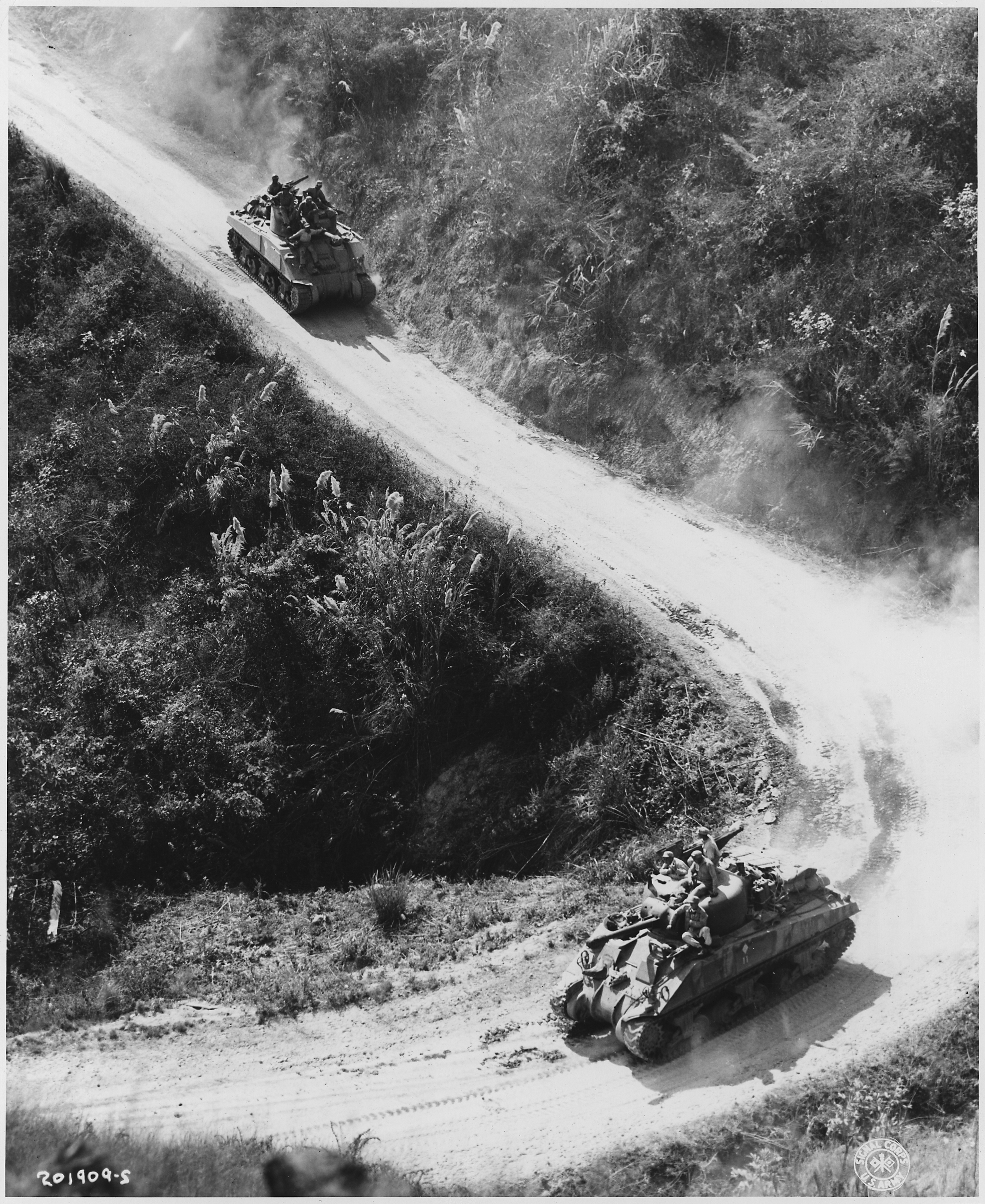
U.S. medium tanks, manned by Chinese and American crews, use the Burma Road for the first time after the combined Allied offensive had broken the two-year Japanese control of the only overland supply route to China., ca. 1945.

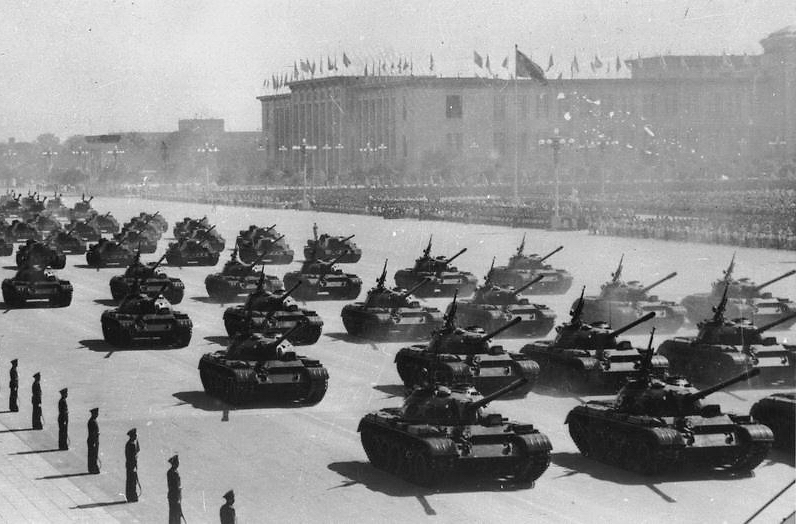
Type 59 Tanks in China's 10th-anniversary parade.

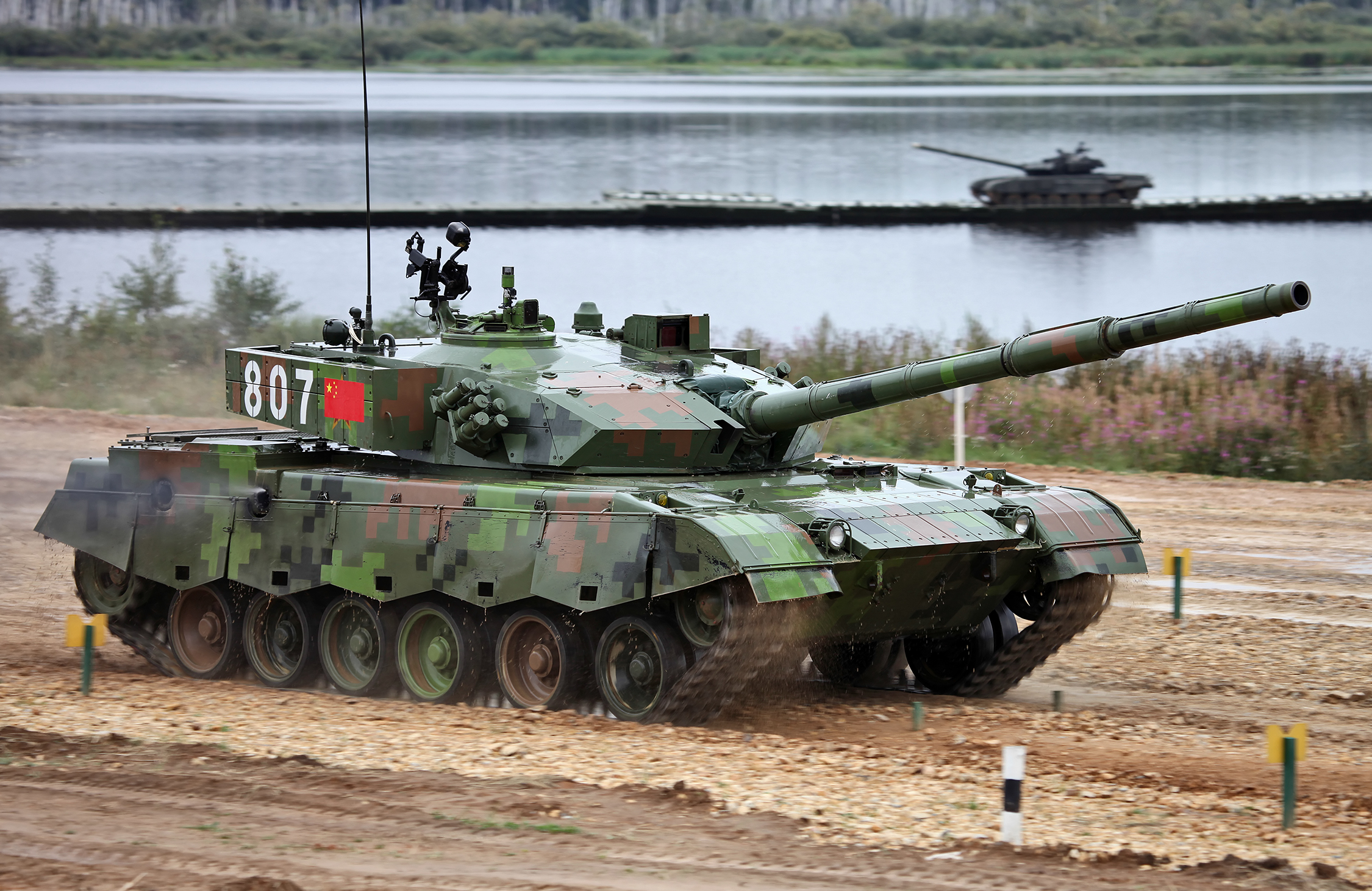
Type 96A Tank at Tank Biathlon

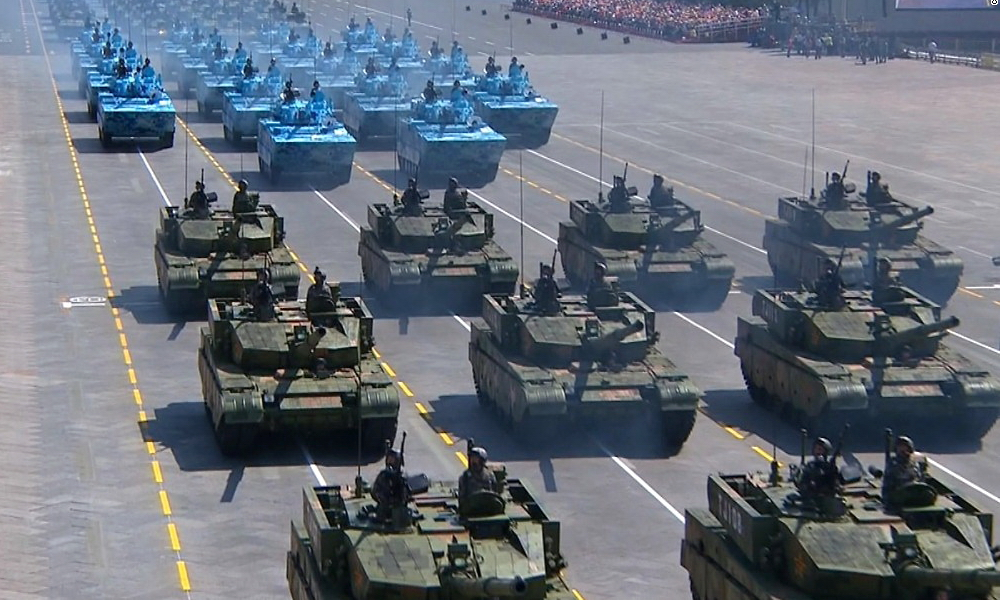
Type 99A Tanks in 2015 China Victory Day Parade

== See also ==
- History of the tank
- Tanks in World War I
- Comparison of World War I tanks
- List of interwar armoured fighting vehicles
- Tanks in World War II
- Development of Chinese Nationalist air force (1937–1945)

== Bibliography ==
- Humphreys, Leonard A. (1996). The Way of the Heavenly Sword: The Japanese Army in the 1920s. Stanford University Press. ISBN 0-8047-2375-3.
