= Tank biathlon =

Military sporting event

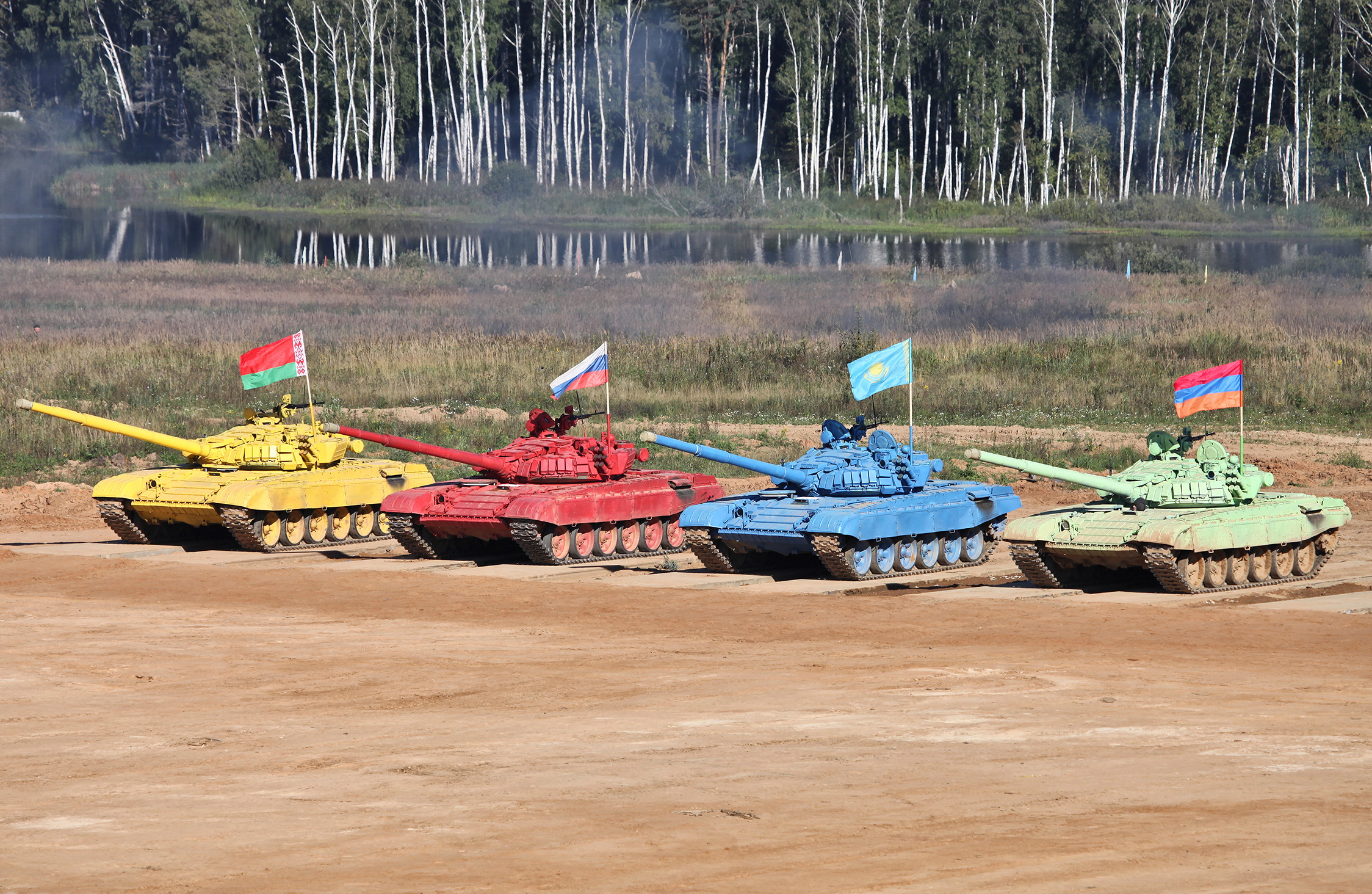
Four T-72B tanks of the participants, 2013

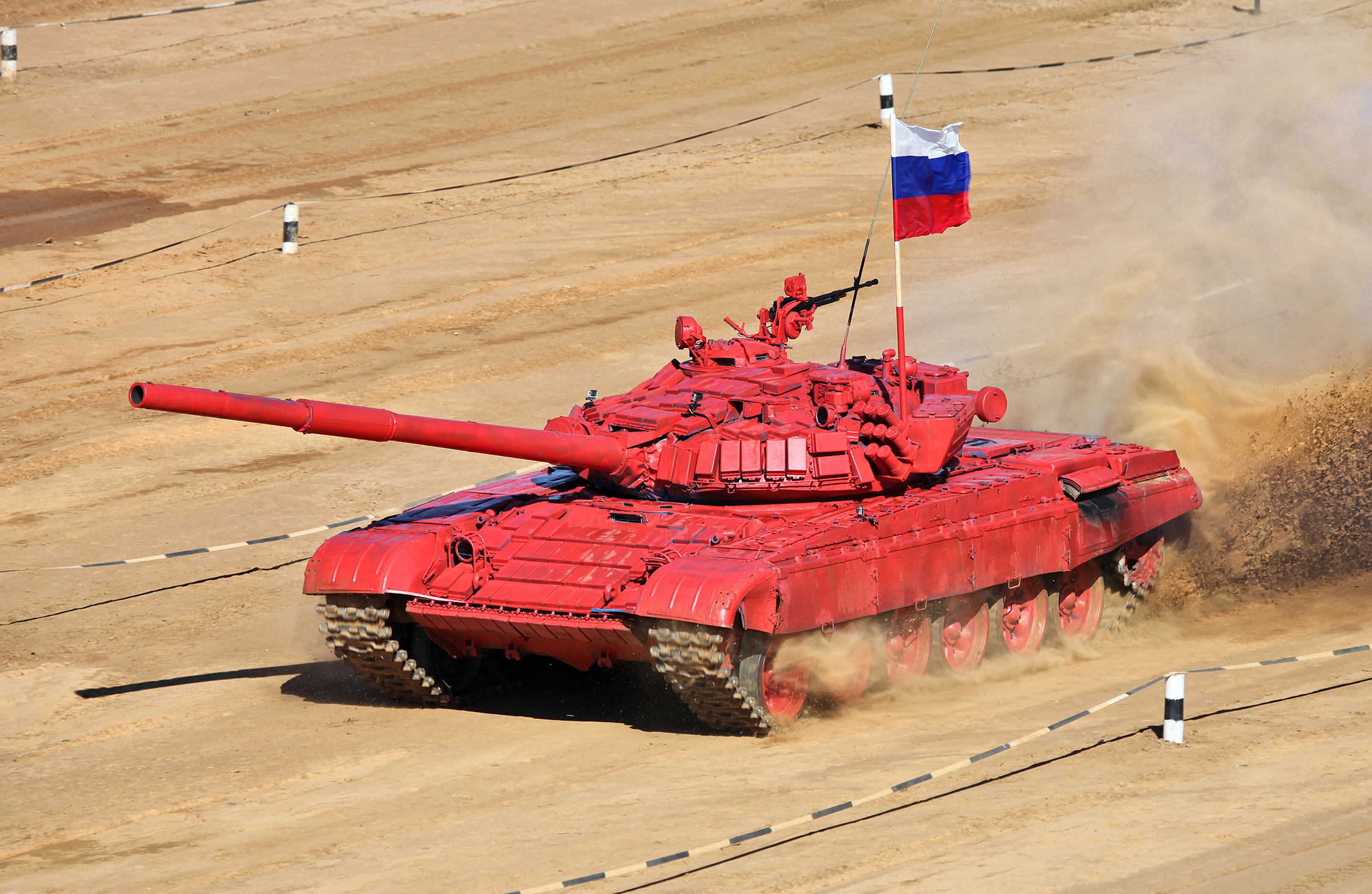
Russian T-72B, 2013

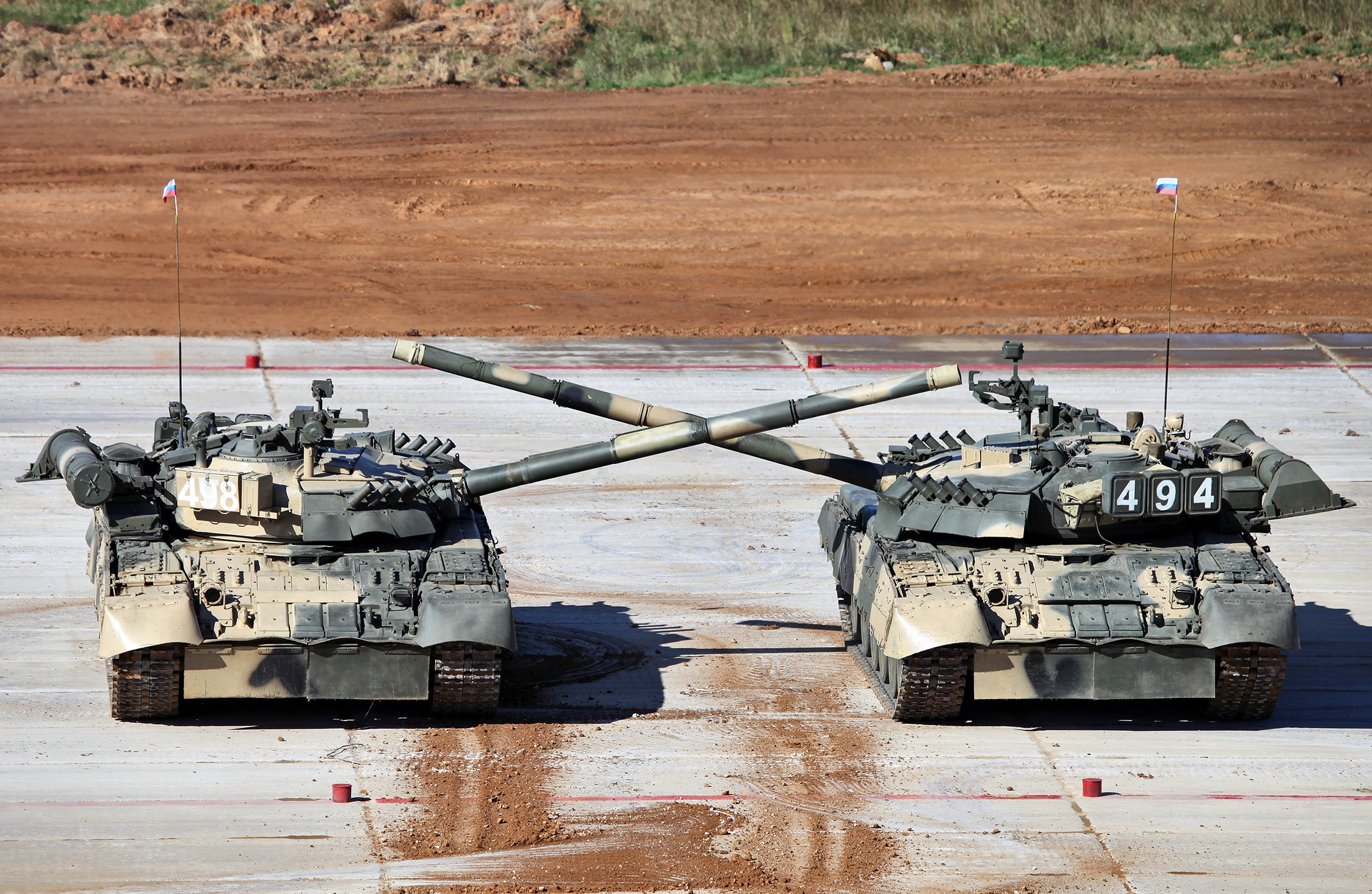
T-80U tanks waltzing at the show, 2013

The tank biathlon is a mechanized military sport event held by the Russian military as a part of the annual International Army Games. Inspired by the winter sport of biathlon, the sport emphasizes the complex training of tank crews including their rough terrain passing skills combined with the ability to provide accurate and rapid fire while performing maneuvers.

== Description ==
One of the shooting targets used in tank biathlon (dimensions in centimeters)

Participating tanks drive a three-lap route of 6–10 km (3.7–6.2 mi). During the first lap, crews fire at tank-size targets positioned at distances of 1,600 m (5,200 ft), 1,700 m (5,600 ft), and 1,800 m (5,900 ft) (crews aim by optics, without any modern fire-control system). In the second lap, different targets imitating an anti-tank mortar (RPG) squad and an infantry unit are fired upon. These targets are at a distance of 600–700 m (2,000–2,300 ft), and must be engaged with a 7.62 mm coaxial machine gun. In the third lap, the tank crews fire at targets shaped like an anti-tank gun and ATGM unit using the turret-mounted heavy machine gun at a distance of 1,200 m (3,900 ft). One or more misses leads to an extra penalty lap 500 m (1,600 ft) long. On the final lap, tanks have to go through various terrain obstacles; an obstacle missed or improperly traversed adds 10 seconds to the crew's final timing.

== Events ==
The United States received an official invitation in 2013 and an unofficial invitation in 2017. In 2014, 41 countries received the invitation.

=== International competition, 2013 ===
The first international tank biathlon competition was held at the Alabino proving ground in the Moscow Oblast on 12–17 August 2013. Four teams took part in the competition: Russia, Armenia, Belarus and Kazakhstan.

| Colour | Place | Team | Range 1 | | Range 2 | | Range 3 | | Total time |
| Colour | Place | Team | H | P | H | P | H | P | Total time |
|---|---|---|---|---|---|---|---|---|---|
| Red | 1 | Russia | 1 | 0 | 0 | 0 | 2 | 0 | 23:44 |
| Blue | 2 | Kazakhstan | 0 | 1 | 1 | 0 | 1 | 2 | 24:36 |
| Yellow | 3 | Belarus | 0 | 0 | 1 | 0 | 2 | 1 | 25:25 |
| Green | 4 | Armenia | 0 | 1 | 1 | 0 | 1 | 2 | 29:48 |

=== 1st Tank Biathlon World Championship, 2014 ===
The 1st Tank Biathlon World Championship took place at the Alabino proving ground on 4–16 August 2014. Out of 41 nations that received invitation to the tournament, 12 sent their representatives. Every competitor (except Teams China and Russia) received a T-72B tank in the biathlon color scheme. Team Russia piloted the newest modification, T-72B3, and Team China brought their own Type 96A.

Russian preliminaries for the event ran in several of military districts of Russia. Each district sent its top crews to compete for the Cup of Russia, and 3 finalists from that event formed the national Team Russia for the World Championship. Participating nations also held preliminaries on their own, sending 3 top crews and a reserve crew accompanied by maintenance and repair personnel to Russia.

Random selection placed teams under following colors:

| Color | No. | Team |
|---|---|---|
| Red | 1 | Russia |
| Red | 2 | Mongolia |
| Red | 3 | Venezuela |
| Blue | 4 | Kazakhstan |
| Blue | 5 | Belarus |
| Blue | 6 | Armenia |
| Green | 7 | China |
| Green | 8 | Serbia |
| Green | 9 | Kyrgyzstan |
| Yellow | 10 | India |
| Yellow | 11 | Angola |
| Yellow | 12 | Kuwait |

First legs of the tournament consisted of:

- Individual race
- Sprint
- Pursuit
- Athletic stage

==== Final ====
The final competition was a relay race, the top 4 teams fielded all their crews taking turns.

| Total time | Team |
|---|---|
| 75:14 | Russia |
| 80:03 | Armenia |
| 90:56 | China |
| 94:11 | Kazakhstan |

=== 2nd Tank Biathlon World Championship, 2015 ===
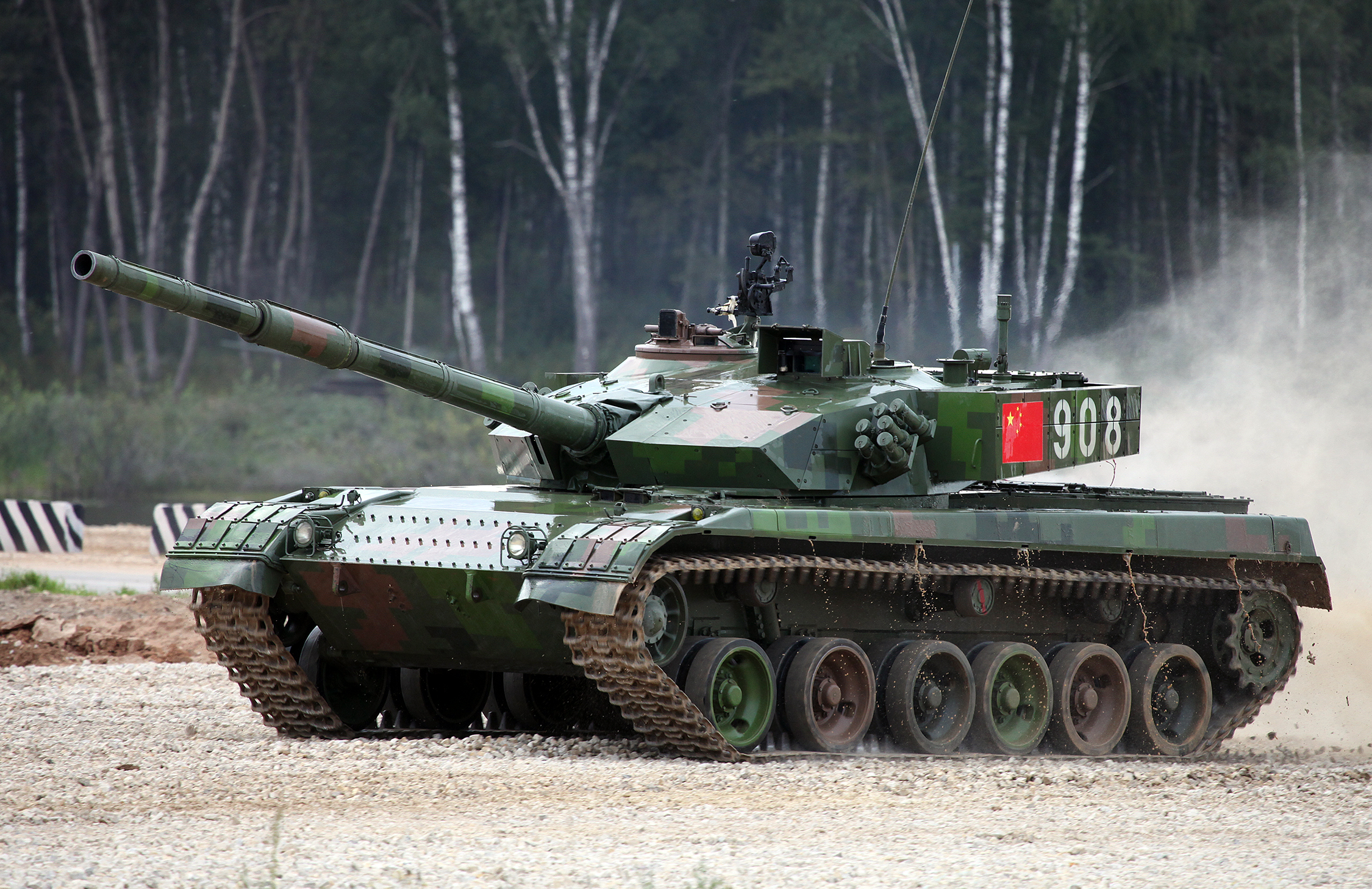
A Chinese Type 96A at the 2015 tank biathlon

The second event of the series took part on 1–15 August 2015 at the same venue in Alabino. This year the Tank Biathlon was held as a headliner of the 2015 International Army Games that included similar competitions for all things military, from artillery (Masters of Fire) and air force (Aviadarts) to field kitchens. The athletic stage for the crews was removed from the schedule.

Veteran of both previous events, Team Belarus decided to participate in the Army Games "only in the disciplines where we are absolutely ready" and thus did not enter the Tank Biathlon (after finishing only 5th last year). Consequently, Belarus won 3 gold, 50 silver and 249 bronze awards and finished 3rd in the total medal score of the Army Games, being surpassed only by Russia and China. The Nicaragua and Tajikistan national teams joined the event for the first time.

All teams were piloting upgraded T-72B3 tanks, excluding Team China which continued to field its own Type 96A.

List of participants with color scheme:

| Color | No. | Team |
|---|---|---|
| Red | 1 | Russia |
| Red | 2 | Venezuela |
| Red | 3 | Armenia |
| Red | 4 | Kyrgyzstan |
| Blue | 5 | Nicaragua |
| Blue | 6 | Angola |
| Blue | 7 | China |
| Green | 8 | Tajikistan |
| Green | 9 | Mongolia |
| Green | 10 | Kazakhstan |
| Yellow | 11 | India |
| Yellow | 12 | Serbia |
| Yellow | 13 | Kuwait |

==== Semifinal ====
| Total time | Team |
|---|---|
| 73:30 | Russia |
| 77:32 | China |
| 78:18 | Kazakhstan |
| 83:23 | Serbia |
| 94:12 | India |
| 97:06 | Kyrgyzstan |
| 120:04 | Tajikistan |
| DSQ | Armenia |

==== Final ====
| Total time | Team |
|---|---|
| 72:09 | Russia |
| 79:21 | China |
| 84:56 | Serbia |
| 86:16 | Kazakhstan |

=== 3rd Tank Biathlon World Championship, 2016 ===
The third Tank Biathlon took place in Alabino as part of the 2nd International Army Games from 30 July to 13 August.

| Colour | Place | Team |
|---|---|---|
| Red | 1 | Russia |
| Blue | 2 | China |
| Green | 3 | Kazakhstan |
| Blue | 4 | Belarus |
| Blue | 5 | Serbia |
| Yellow | 6 | India |
| Green | 7 | Azerbaijan |
| Green | 8 | Mongolia |
| Red | 9 | Armenia |
| Red | 10 | Kyrgyzstan |
| Yellow | 11 | Angola |
| Yellow | 12 | Iran |

=== 4th Tank Biathlon World Championship, 2017 ===
The fourth Tank Biathlon also took place in Alabino. The countries used the same type of tanks as in previous years (T-72B3 and Type-96B), with the exception of India fielding T-90 Bhishma. New Delhi Television reported that the Indian Army felt disadvantaged using T-72B3 tanks provided by Russia in 2016 and was keen to field its best tanks and best crews in 2017. However, as a result of both T-90 Bhishma tanks (the main one and the reserve one) malfunctioning, the Indian squad was unable to complete the race and were disqualified before the semifinal.

After seven days of contests, Team Russia won 11 gold, 5 silver and 4 bronze awards and finished 1st in the overall ratings, and Team China achieved second place with 7 gold, 2 silver and 2 bronze.

| Place | Team |
|---|---|
| 1 | Russia |
| 2 | China |
| 3 | Kazakhstan |
| 4 | Belarus |
| 5 | Azerbaijan |
| 6 | Serbia |
| 7 | Iran |
| 8 | Mongolia |
| 9 | Venezuela |
| 10 | Armenia |
| 11 | Kyrgyzstan |
| 12 | India |

=== 6th Tank Biathlon World Championship, 2019 ===
The competition had a slight change of rules, with two divisions (Division 1 and Division 2). Division 1 consisted of the 12 strongest participants in the 2018 edition, while Division 2 consists of all other participants. After two weeks of contests, Russia once again become the World Champion with the result of 1:33:20. In Division 2, Uzbekistan won the finals, and as they participate in the 2020 edition, they are promoted to Division 1.

==== Division 1 standings ====
| Place | Team | Final round |
|---|---|---|
| 1 | Russia | Champions |
| 2 | Belarus | Final |
| 3 | Kazakhstan | Final |
| 4 | Azerbaijan | Final |
| 5 | Mongolia | Semi-final |
| 6 | China | Semi-final |
| 7 | Venezuela | Semi-final |
| 8 | Serbia | Semi-final |
| 9 | Syria | Eliminated in individual race |
| 10 | Kyrgyzstan | Eliminated in individual race |
| 11 | Armenia | Eliminated in individual race |
| 12 | Iran | Eliminated in individual race |

==== Division 2 standings ====
| Place | Team | Final round |
|---|---|---|
| 1 | Uzbekistan | Champions |
| 2 | Vietnam | Final |
| 3 | Cuba | Final |
| 4 | Uganda | Final |
| 5 | Myanmar | Semi-final |
| 6 | Kuwait | Semi-final |
| 7 | Tajikistan | Semi-final |
| 8 | Laos | Semi-final |
| 9 | Angola | Eliminated in individual race |
| 10 | Sudan | Eliminated in individual race |
| 11 | Zimbabwe | |

=== 7th Tank Biathlon World Championship, 2020 ===
==== Division 1 standings ====
| Place | Team | Final round |
|---|---|---|
| 1 | Russia | Champions |
| 2 | China | Final |
| 3 | Belarus | Final |
| 4 | Azerbaijan | Final |
| 5 | Kazakhstan | Semi-final |
| 6 | Uzbekistan | Semi-final |
| 7 | Serbia | Semi-final |
| 8 | Kyrgyzstan | Semi-final |

==== Division 2 standings ====
| Place | Team | Final round |
|---|---|---|
| 1 | Vietnam | Champions |
| 2 | Laos | Final |
| 3 | Tajikistan | Final |
| 4 | Myanmar | Final |
| 5 | Congo | Semi-final |
| 6 | Abkhazia | |
| 7 | South Ossetia | |
| 8 | Qatar | |

=== 8th Tank Biathlon World Championship, 2021 ===
The 8th Tank Biathlon took place between 22 August and 4 September 2021 at the Alabino proving grounds.

Russia once again become the World Champion, followed by China, Kazakhstan and Azerbaijan.

=== 9th Tank Biathlon World Championship, 2022 ===
The 2022 Tank Biathlon took place between 13 and 27 August 2022.

The biathlon has not been held since 2023 as the International Army Games were paused due to shortages stemming from the Russian invasion of Ukraine.

== Medalist table ==
1st Division
| Year | Gold | Silver | Bronze |
|---|---|---|---|
| 2014 | Russia | Armenia | China |
| 2015 | Russia | China | Serbia |
| 2016 | Russia | China | Kazakhstan |
| 2017 | Russia | Kazakhstan | China |
| 2018 | Russia | China | Belarus |
| 2019 | Russia | Belarus | Kazakhstan |
| 2020 | Russia | China | Belarus |
| 2021 | Russia | China | Kazakhstan |
| 2022 | Russia | Belarus | China |

2nd Division
| Year | Gold | Silver | Bronze |
|---|---|---|---|
| 2019 | Uzbekistan | Vietnam | Cuba |
| 2020 | Vietnam | Laos | Tajikistan |
| 2021 | Kyrgyzstan | Tajikistan | Myanmar |
| 2022 | Myanmar | Syria | Tajikistan |

== Rating ==
The table shows the teams' places in each of the world championships. For 2nd division teams, the first number is the place within the division, and the second number is the absolute place. The teams are ranked according to their average (absolute) place.

| Team | Avg | 2013 | 2014 | 2015 | 2016 | 2017 | 2018 | 2019 | 2020 | 2021 | 2022 | 2023 |
|---|---|---|---|---|---|---|---|---|---|---|---|---|
| Russia | 1.00 | 1 | 1 | 1 | 1 | 1 | 1 | 1 | 1 | 1 | 1 | |
| China | 2.78 | | 3 | 2 | 2 | 3 | 2 | 6 | 2 | 2 | 3 | |
| Kazakhstan | 3.50 | 2 | 4 | 4 | 3 | 2 | 4 | 3 | 5 | 3 | 5 | |
| Belarus | 3.56 | 3 | 5 | | 4 | 4 | 3 | 2 | 3 | 6 | 2 | |
| Azerbaijan | 5.00 | | | | 7 | 5 | 5 | 4 | 4 | 4 | 6 | |
| Serbia | 7.00 | | 8 | 3 | 5 | 6 | 11 | 8 | 7 | 8 | | |
| India | 7.00 | | 6 | 5 | 6 | 12 | 6 | | | | | |
| Armenia | 9.25 | 4 | 2 | 8 | 9 | 10 | 10 | 11 | | | 10 20 | |
| Mongolia | 7.63 | | 9 | 10 | 8 | 8 | 7 | 5 | | 7 | 7 | |
| Kyrgyzstan | 9.44 | | 7 | 6 | 10 | 11 | 12 | 10 | 8 | 1 12 | 9 | |
| Iran | 10.80 | | | | 12 | 7 | 9 | 12 | | | 4 14 | |
| Venezuela | 10.00 | | 10 | 11 | 15 | 9 | 8 | 7 | | 10 | 10 | |
| Syria | 11.25 | | | | | | 13 | 9 | | 11 | 2 12 | |
| Uzbekistan | 7.00 | | | | | | | 1 13 | 6 | 5 | 4 | |
| Tajikistan | 13.00 | | | 7 | 14 | 13 | 14 | 7 19 | 3 11 | 2 13 | 3 13 | |
| Kuwait | 13.67 | | 12 | 9 | 13 | 15 | 15 | 6 18 | | | | |
| Angola | 14.67 | | 11 | 12 | 11 | 14 | 19 | 9 21 | | | | |
| Cuba | 15.00 | | | | | | | 3 15 | | | | |
| Nicaragua | 15.00 | | | 13 | 16 | 16 | | | | | | |
| Vietnam | 11.40 | | | | | | 17 | 2 14 | 1 9 | 9 | 8 | |
| Myanmar | 14.00 | | | | | | 16 | 5 17 | 4 12 | 3 14 | 1 11 | |
| Laos | 16.17 | | | | | 17 | 18 | 8 20 | 2 10 | 5 16 | 6 16 | |
| Uganda | 19.00 | | | | | 19 | 22 | 4 16 | | | | |
| Zimbabwe | 19.20 | | | | 17 | 18 | 20 | 11 23 | | | 8 18 | |
| South Africa | 21.00 | | | | | | 21 | | | | | |
| Sudan | 20.50 | | | | | | | 10 22 | | | 9 19 | |
| Qatar | 17.00 | | | | | | | | 8 16 | 7 18 | | |
| Congo | 13.00 | | | | | | | | 5 13 | | | |
| Abkhazia | 16.00 | | | | | | | | 6 14 | 6 17 | 7 17 | |
| South Ossetia | 15.00 | | | | | | | | 7 15 | 4 15 | 5 15 | |
| Mali | 20.00 | | | | | | | | | 8 19 | 11 21 | |

Legend:

- Participant
- Relay race
- Final relay race
- Participant (2nd division)
- Relay race (2nd division)
- Final relay race (2nd division)

== Video game ==
On 23 August 2020, tank biathlon was added as a time-limited event in the War Thunder military simulation game that coincided with the real-world competition.

== See also ==
- Canadian Army Trophy
- Strong Europe Tank Challenge
