= Type 96 tank =

Chinese main battle tank

Type 96 Main Battle Tank ZTZ-96
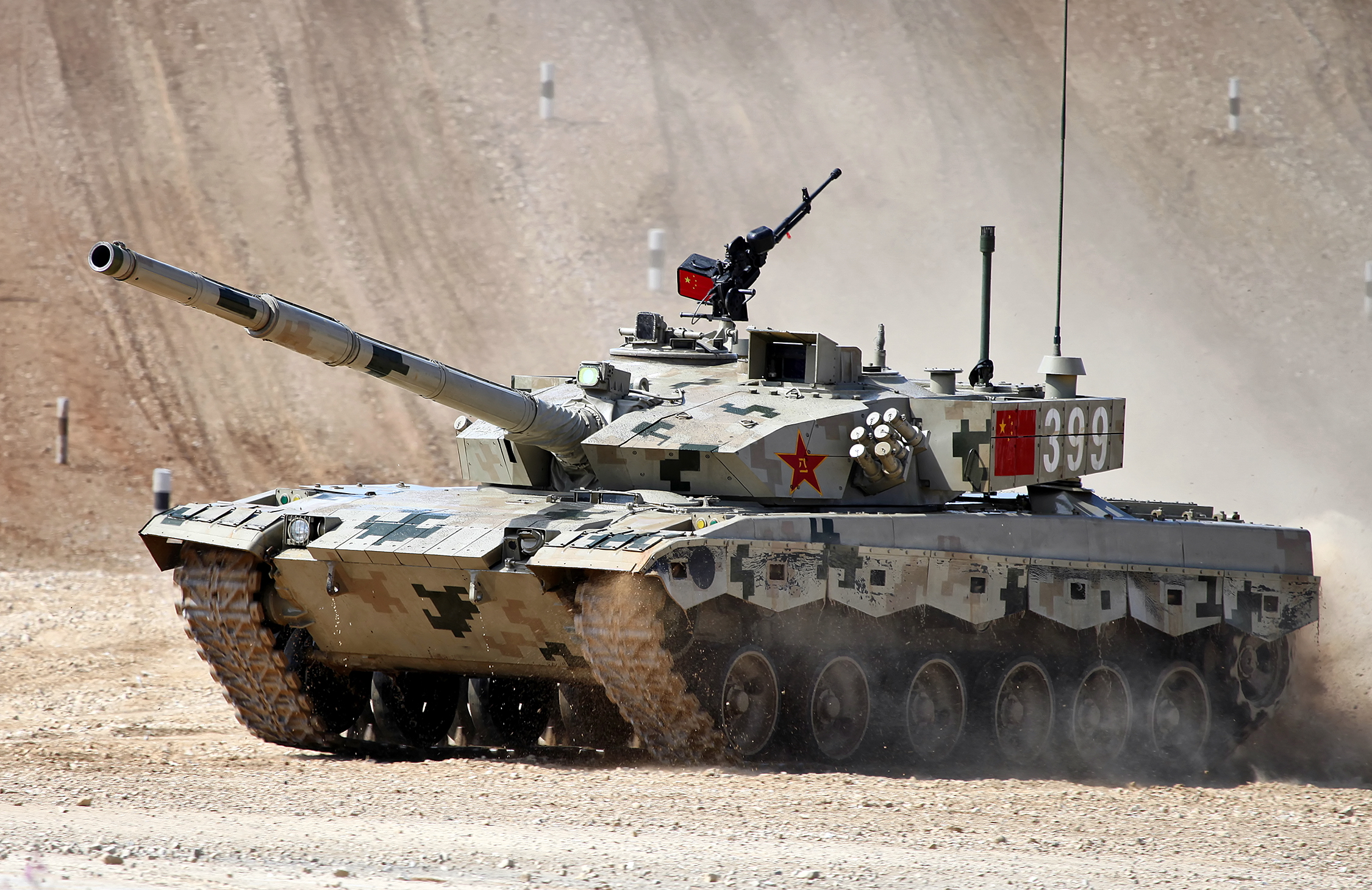
- Type 96B MBT at Tank Biathlon 2017.
- Type: Main battle tank
- Place of origin: China

Service history
- In service: 1997–present
- Used by: See Operators

Production history
- Manufacturer: First Inner Mongolia Machinery Factory
- No. built: 2,500+

Specifications
- Mass: Type 96: 41 tonnes Type 96A: 42.8 tonnes Type 96B: 43 tonnes
- Length: 6.33 m
- Width: 3.45 m
- Height: 2.30 m
- Crew: 3
- Armor: Type 96: Composite armor (Steel & Ceramic Aluminum Titanate with Fibreglass Cloth) Type 96A: Modular applique armor on the turret and FY-4 ERA plates on hull front
- Main armament: Type 88C/ZPT-98 125 mm smoothbore gun, capable of firing ATGMs and depleted uranium rounds
- Secondary armament: Type 86 7.62 mm coaxial machine gun QJC-88 12.7 mm air-defence machine gun
- Engine: Diesel; Type 96: 12V150ZLC - 730 hp (582 kW); Type 96A: 12V150ZLD - 865hp (636 kW); Type 96B: 8V150HB - 1000hp (735kW)
- Power/weight: Type 96: (17.8 hp/tonne); Type 96A: (18.7 hp/tonne); Type 96B: (23 hp/tonne)
- Suspension: Torsion bar
- Operational range: 400 km
- Maximum speed: 65 km/h 74 km/h (Type 96B)

The Type 96 (Chinese: 96式; pinyin: Jiǔliù shì) or ZTZ96 is a Chinese second generation main battle tank (MBT). The final evolution of the Type 88 design, the Type 96 entered service with the People's Liberation Army (PLA) in 1997. The later variants of the Type 96 are currently in PLA service together with China's third generation MBT, the Type 99.

== History ==
China's tank development can be divided into three generations. The first generation was the Type 59, a locally manufactured copy of the Soviet T-54 and its derivative tanks. The second generation of MBTs started with the Type 80 and reached its end state as the Type 96. The third generation began with the Type 99 tank.

China's first generation tank development program failed to meet the PLA's performance requirements. These technical shortcomings coincided with the appearance of the T-72 and T-80 tanks in Russia, which influenced Chinese defense officials and contributed to their decision to begin development of a new generation indigenous MBT in the early 1980s. This new program was to lead to the development of the Type 80/85 family by 1988.

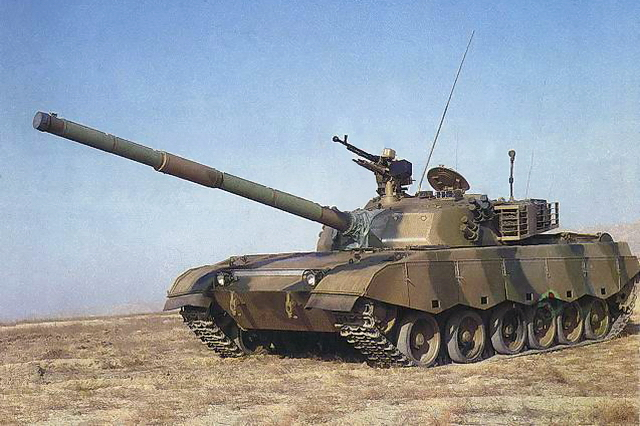
Chinese Type 85-IIM Tank, Export version of Type 96 tank.

The Type 80 prototypes were accepted into PLA service as the Type 88A/B. Most distinctively, the Type 88 family had six road wheels instead of the five that the previous Chinese MBTs possessed. However, after the 1991 Gulf War the PLA soon realized that the Type 88 design was insufficient, due to Iraqi Type 59/69 tanks' poor performance against contemporary NATO tanks (as the Type 88 itself is a further development of the Type 59). A better domestic MBT was required. However, continued delays in China's third gen MBT development meant the PLA had no choice but to continue development of the Type 85 family. In 1995, Norinco produced the Type 85-III prototype with an upgraded engine and explosive reactive armor.

In 1997, the upgraded Type 85-IIM prototypes were accepted into PLA service as the Type 88C/Type 96. The most visible difference between the Type 96 and earlier Type 88 series tanks was the additional spaced armor on the turret front. This spaced armor gave the Type 96 a rectangular front profile, visually distinguishing it from the round turret of the Type 88. Other visible differences included their armament: the Type 96 possessed a locally designed 125mm smoothbore gun while the earlier Type 88 variants used a 105mm rifled gun instead. This made the Type 96 the first PLA tank in service armed with a 125mm caliber gun.

By mid-2016, the Chinese military had over 7,000 tanks in active service, including about 2,077 Type 96/Type 96As and about 814 Type 99/Type 99As. Compared to the Type 99—with its high capability and similarly high cost—the cheaper Type 96B is seen by domestic experts as the main tank in the modernization of the PLA.

=== Deployment ===
In the early 2000s, the Type 96 was the PLA's main armored firepower for maneuver warfare units. 31 tanks are deployed in an armored battalion and 10 tanks are deployed in a company.

After the PLA's reforms in 2017, the Type 96 is deployed in the combined arms battalion of the new heavy combined arms brigade. Each battalion features two tank companies and two mechanized infantry companies, with each company having 14 vehicles.

=== International Tank Biathlon ===
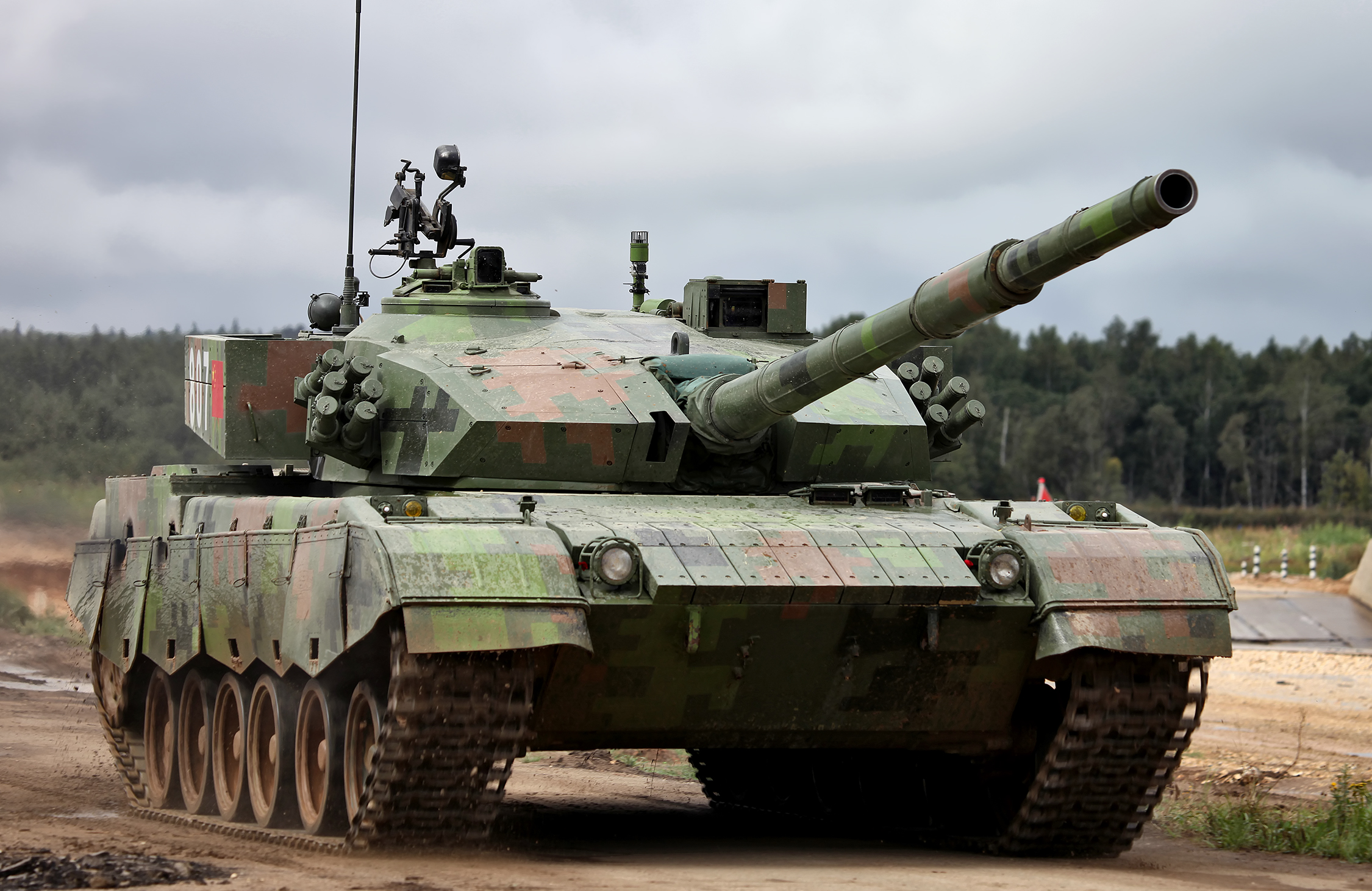
Type 96A at Tank Biathlon 2014

In 2014, China participated with the Type 96A in the Russian-hosted tank biathlon, where it competed against the Russian T-72B3, clinching third place. China participated again in 2015, coming in second place. In 2016, it won one gold medal (out of a total of 23 awarded gold medals). China once again reached the finals of the Tank Biathlon in 2021.

== Design ==
=== Armaments ===
The main armament is a 2-plane stabilized 125 mm ZPT-98 smoothbore gun with an autoloader using a carousel-style magazine. The main gun has a fume extractor located midway along its length. Secondary armaments include a QJC-88 12.7 mm heavy machine gun and a 7.62 mm coaxial machine gun. The Type 96 is equipped with the ISFCS-212 computerized fire-control system with a ballistic computer, laser rangefinder, and automatic target tracking capability. When the Type 96 entered service, its fire-control system was reportedly superior to that of the T-72 tanks fielded by other nations at the time. The Type 96 is capable of day/night all-weather operations as the driver, gunner and commander have access to night vision devices and image intensifiers.

Type 96A is fitted with ISFCS-212B fire-control system, which replaced the gunner night vision sight with thermal imaging system sporting 3x and 8x optical magnifications. The new GUMS-2 digital ballistic computer provides more detailed calibration in sophisticated environments. The gunner thermal sight is connected to the commander terminal, which allows the commander to take over in an emergency. Type 96B's fire-control system is further upgraded from Type 96A, which includes new computer, communication, command and control systems. Despite the lack of commander-independent thermal sight, the fire-control computer of Type 96A and Type 96B allows the commander to acquire and engage enemy targets through the optical periscope mounted on the commander's hatch.

=== Protection ===
The vehicle features six double-tired road wheels with tracks. The upper portions of the tracks are protected by armor skirts in a saw-toothed shape. The glacis plate is sloped to the point of being near-horizontal for better protection. The turret has a low-profile design, which makes the vehicle less likely to be seen on the battlefield. Six smoke grenade dischargers are fitted to the side of the turret, providing total of 12 smokes. Due to the use of autoloader, the tank only has a crew of three, which consists of the driver, tank commander, and gunner. The tank series is also fitted with NBC protection and automatic fire suppression system. Type 96 features steel and composite armor on the front hull and turret. On Type 96A, the tank turret is fully welded with improved steel armor layer and composite mix. The arrow-shaped FY-4 explosive reactive armor (ERA) blocks are mounted on the turret, hull, and storage bucket for increased protection. Type 96B's armor layout is similar to that of Type 96A.

An electro-optical activated defense system, TCS-2, developed by the 303 Institute of Norinco, is installed on the Type 96A prototype. TCS-2 was not installed on the mass-produced version due to limited protection against modern anti-tank missiles.

In 2026, Type 96 tanks began to receive defensive modifications such as the GL-6 hard-kill active protection system (APS) and anti-drone countermeasure launchers. Type 96A with APS was observed in PLA large-scale training exercises. The appearance of APS showed that China was learning and upgrading its older tank fleet to counter drone threats that proliferated during the Russo-Ukrainian War.

=== Mobility ===
The tank driver sits at the front-left of the hull. The tank commander and gunner sit in the turret. The engine compartment is located in the rear. The Type 96 tank was powered by a 730 hp (582 kW) engine which was subsequently upgraded to a 800 hp engine on the Type 96A.

On the Type 96B, the engine was upgraded again to 1200 hp (895 kW). It also features a new hydropneumatic suspension system and automatic transmission system, providing greater mobility and responsiveness. The increase in horsepower also allows the Type 96B to have a very high power-to-weight ratio, improving its acceleration and hill climbing abilities.

== Variants ==
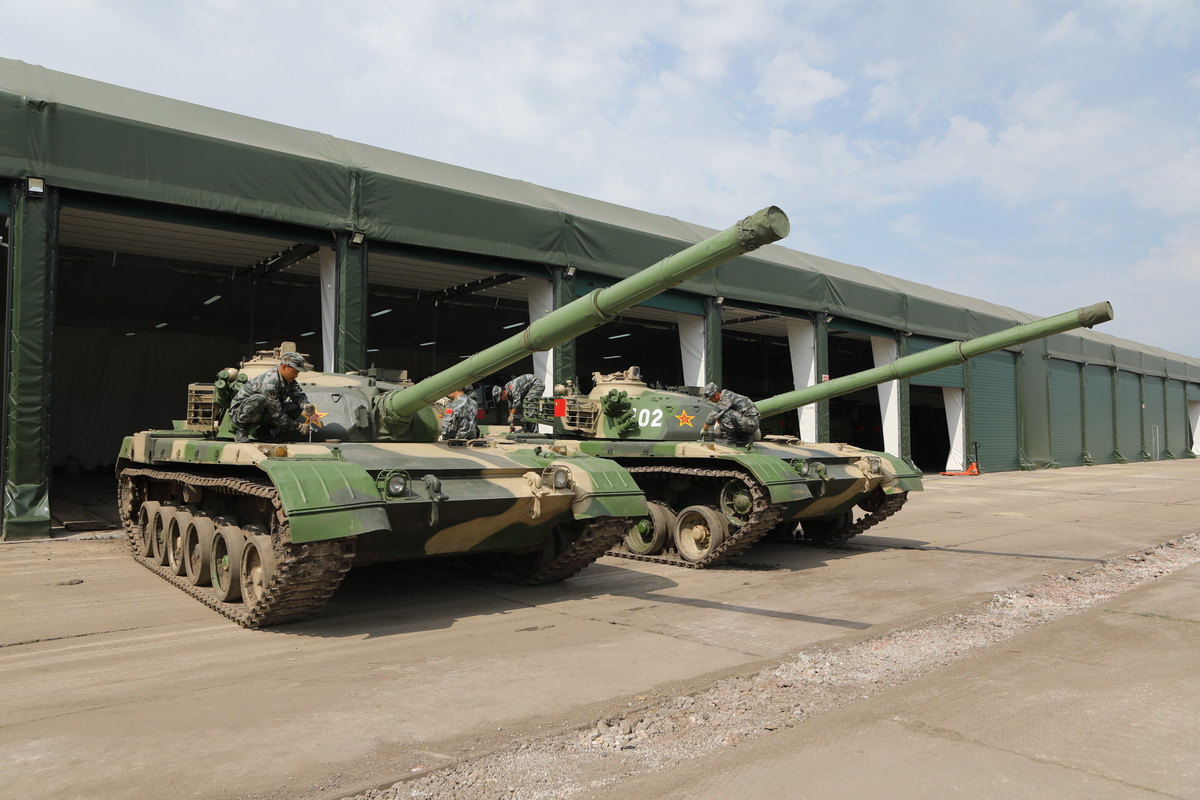
Type 96 tank

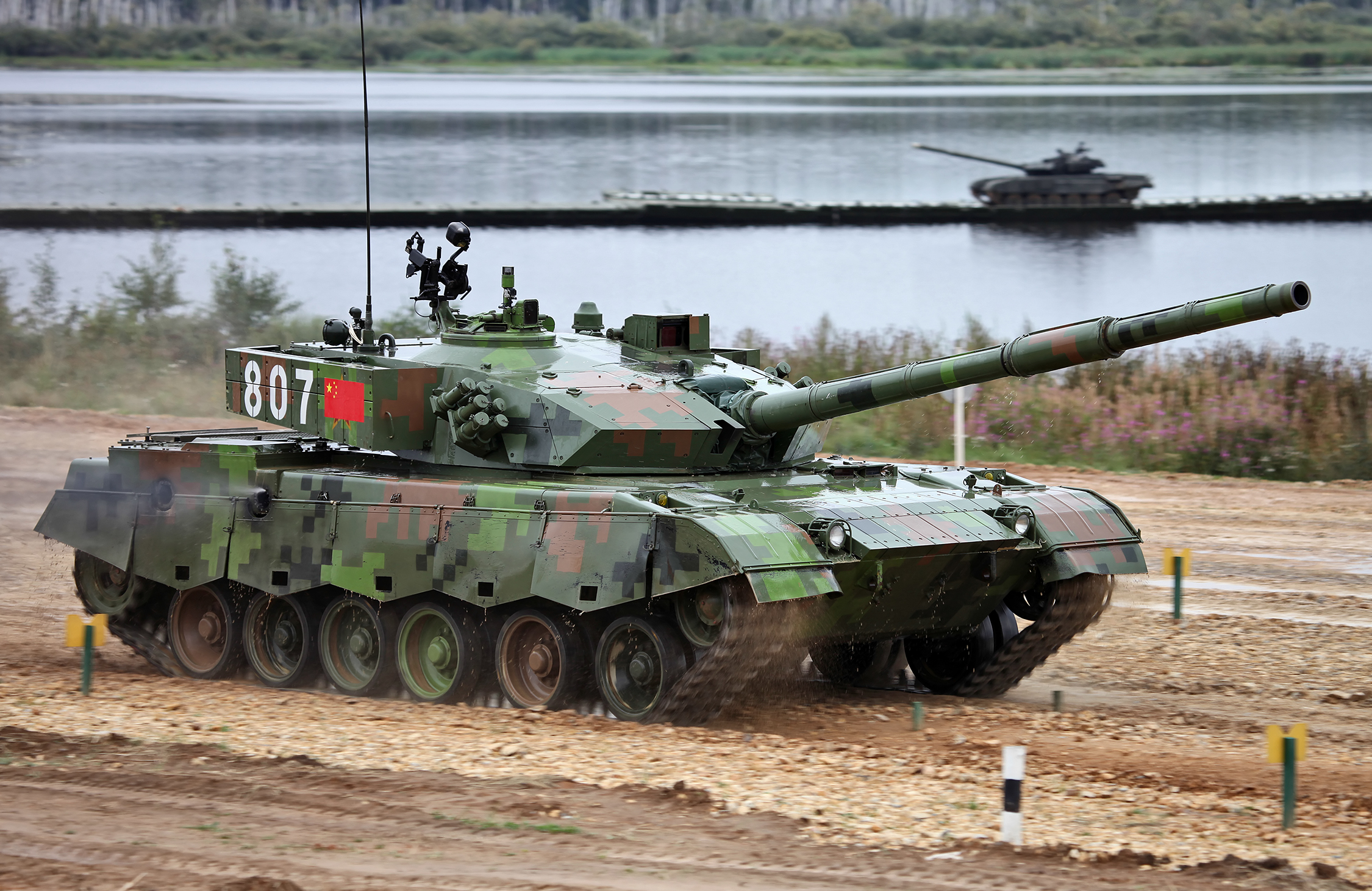
Chinese Type 96A MBT at Tank Biathlon 2014.

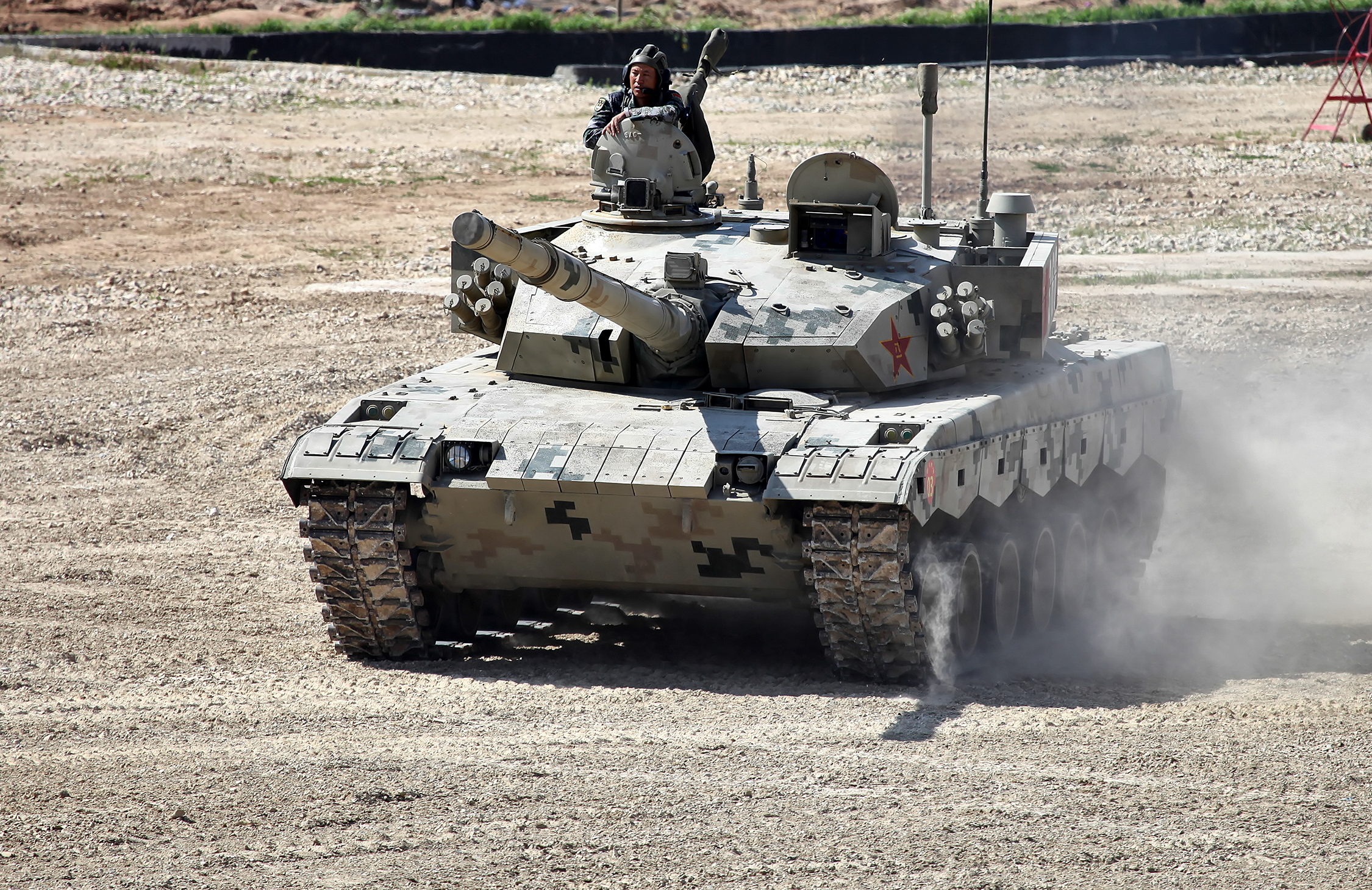
Type 96B at Tank Biathlon 2017

=== Type 96 ===
Domestic version of Type 85-IIM. Sometimes mistakenly referred to as the Type 88C. Renamed Type 96 when put into PLA service. In comparison to the Type 85 and Type 88, the Type 96 features a more powerful engine, improved electronics and a welded turret. Type 96 was accepted by the PLA in 1997.

=== Type 96A ===
Additional "arrow-shaped" modular armor similar to the Type 99 is installed on the turret front. The back of the hull is now completely flat compared to the baseline Type 96. The Type 96A was first revealed in 2006, but in-service tanks were first seen in a military parade in 2009.

The Type 96A is a third-generation upgrade of the Type 96. Its internal electronics may have been upgraded to Type 99 standards. The visual profile of the Type 96A is similar to the Type 99. However, the Type 96A can be distinguished from the Type 99 by the driver's position of the left side of the hull. FY-4 ERA was added on front upper glacis. The vehicle is equipped with a thermal imager. Features an upgraded 800 hp (600 kW) engine.

TCS-2 electro-optical active defense system, similar to the Shtora, has been installed. Electro-optical jammers which are able to jam enemy guided missiles, rangefinders, and designators are found on the tank.

=== Type 96B ===
Variant first seen in July 2016 loaded on a Russia-bound train to participate in the 2016 tank biathlon. It is equipped with an improved engine, improved high-performance gun with an upgraded fire-control system, new transmission, chassis, ventilation, communications and computer systems, exhaust and suspension. However it still doesn't feature a commander-independent sight. Compared to the previous variants, the two exhausts that were originally located on the right side of the hull are now located on the rear hull with air vents. The Type 96B has a stated maximum speed of 74 km/h.

=== VT-2 ===
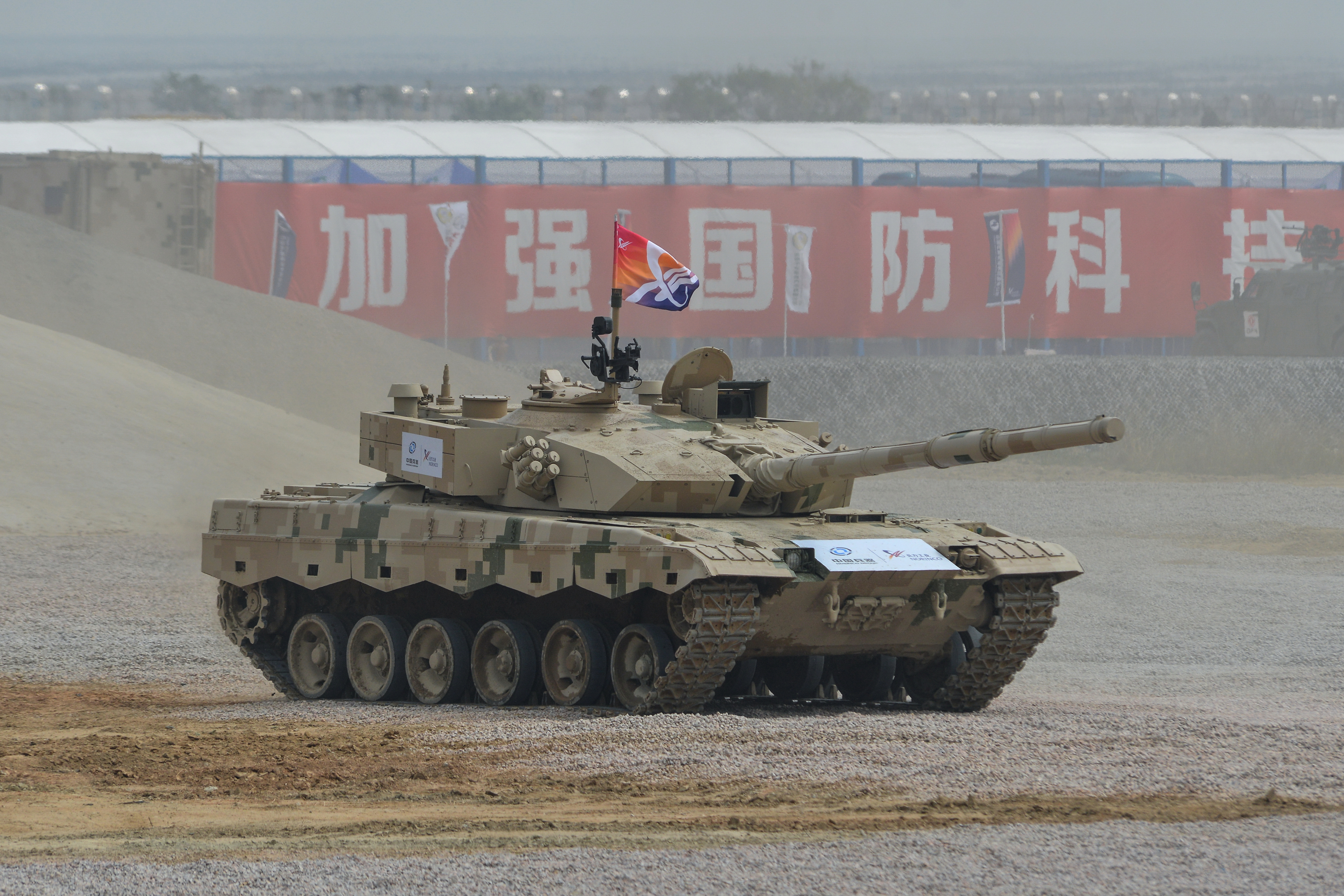
VT-2 Tank

Export variant of Type-96A. Debuted at the 2012 Defence Services Asia Exhibition. Can be equipped with Remote Weapons Station and has a maximum speed of 70 km/h (on road). Capable of turning on its own axis. On December 9, 2021, the Tanzania People's Defence Force displayed a single unit of the VT-2 main battle tank during a parade in Dar es Salaam to mark the 60th anniversary of Tanzanian independence.

== Operators ==
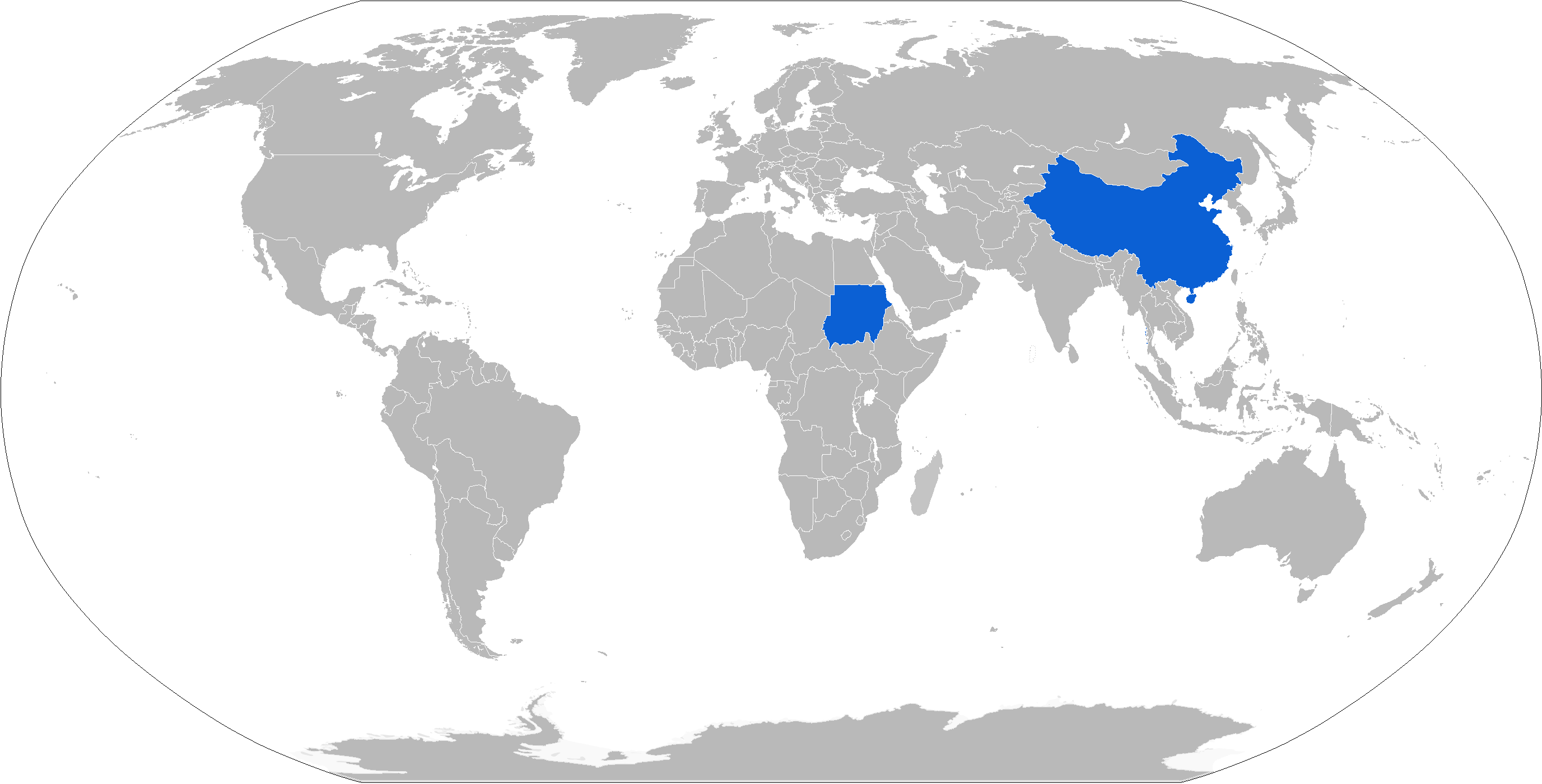
Map of Type 96 operators

China

- People's Liberation Army – 36+ battalions of Type-96A (around 1,500 units), 31+ battalions of Type 96 (around 1,000 units) as of December 2015.

Tanzania

- Tanzania People's Defence Force – 5+ VT-2 delivered to Tanzania in 2021, according to the Stockholm International Peace Research Institute. One VT-2 was displayed at a military parade in October 2021.

Sudan

- Sudanese Armed Forces - Since 2008.

== Gallery ==
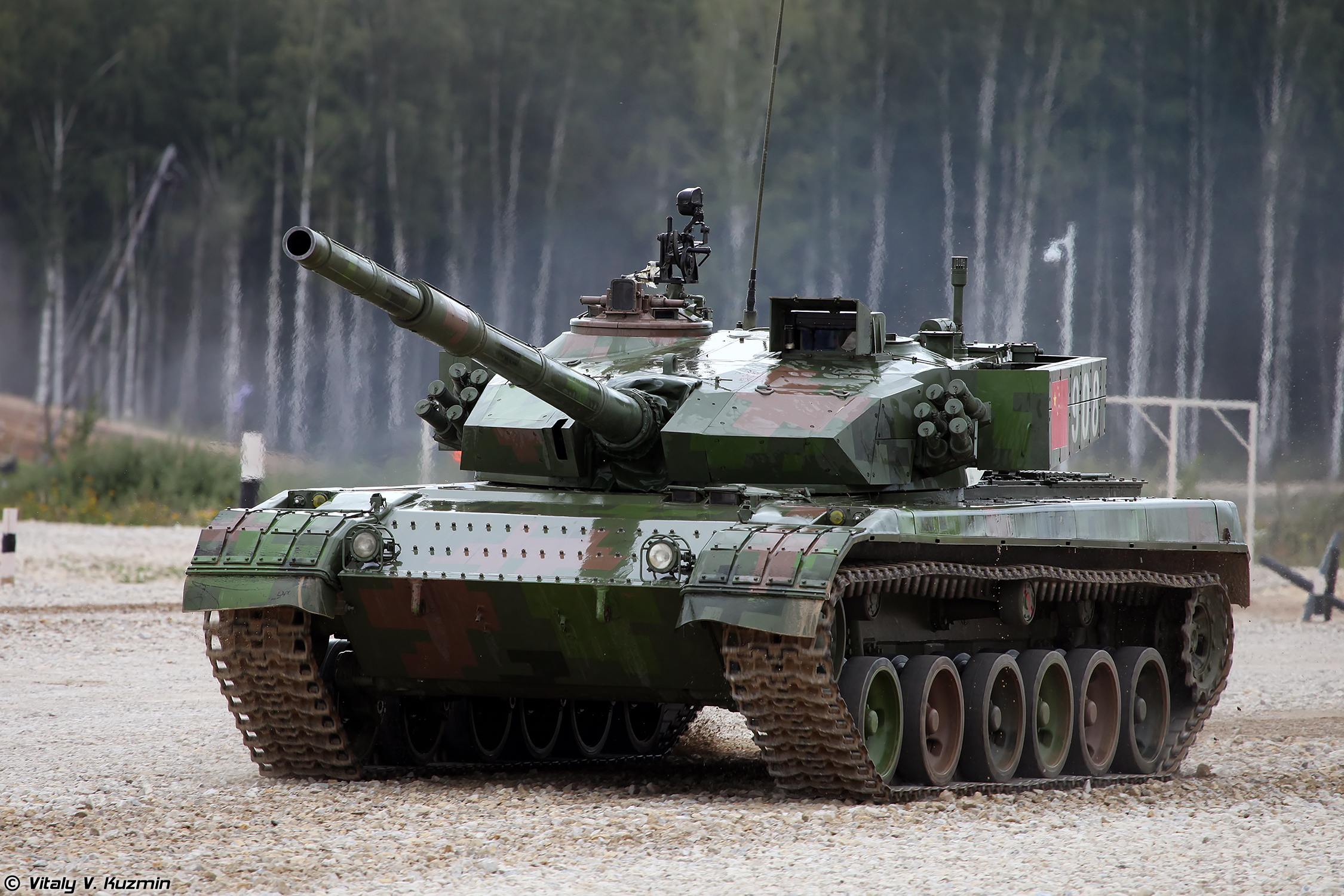
Type 96A tank without hull ERA mounted.

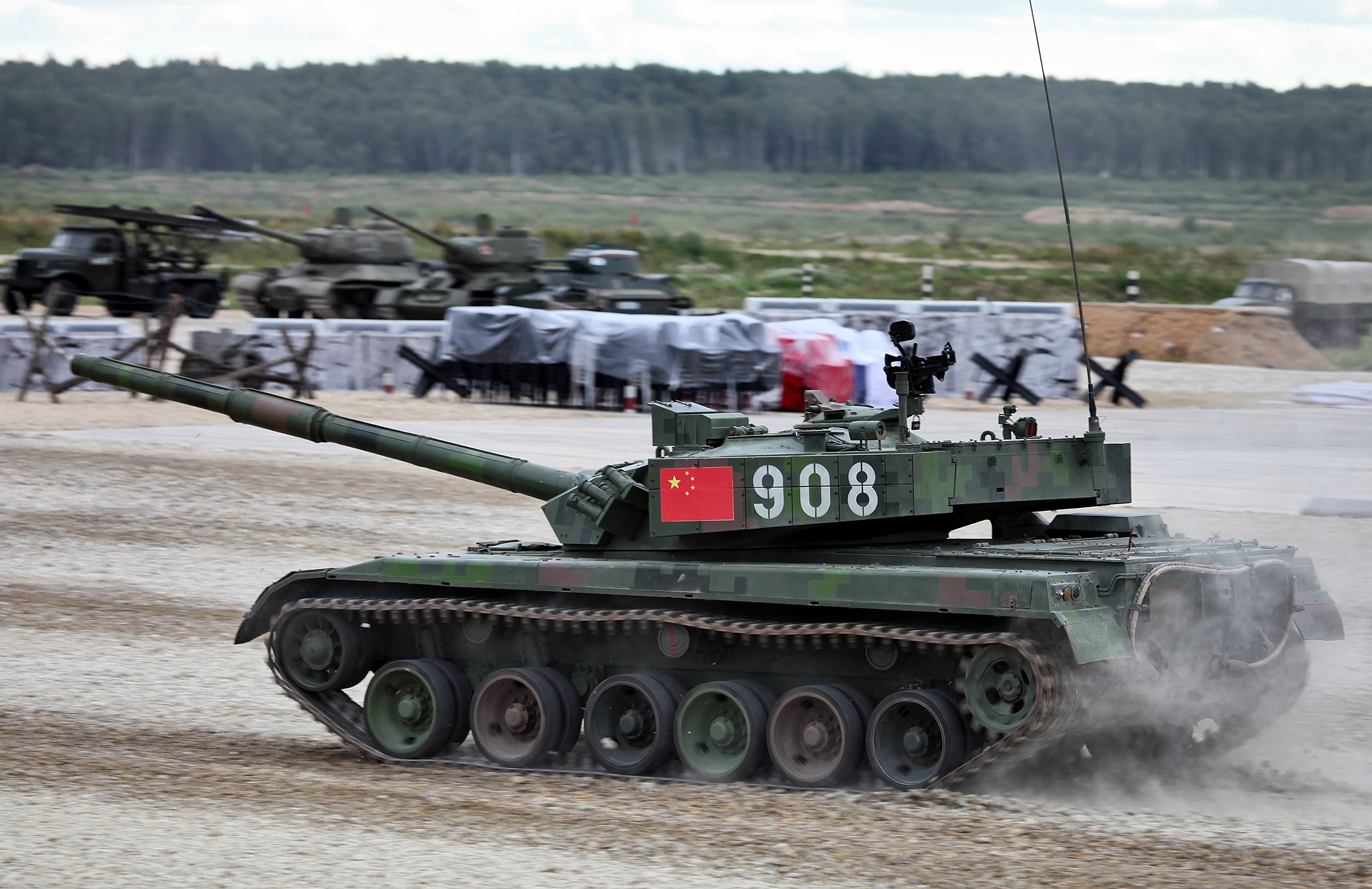
Rear side of the Type 96A.

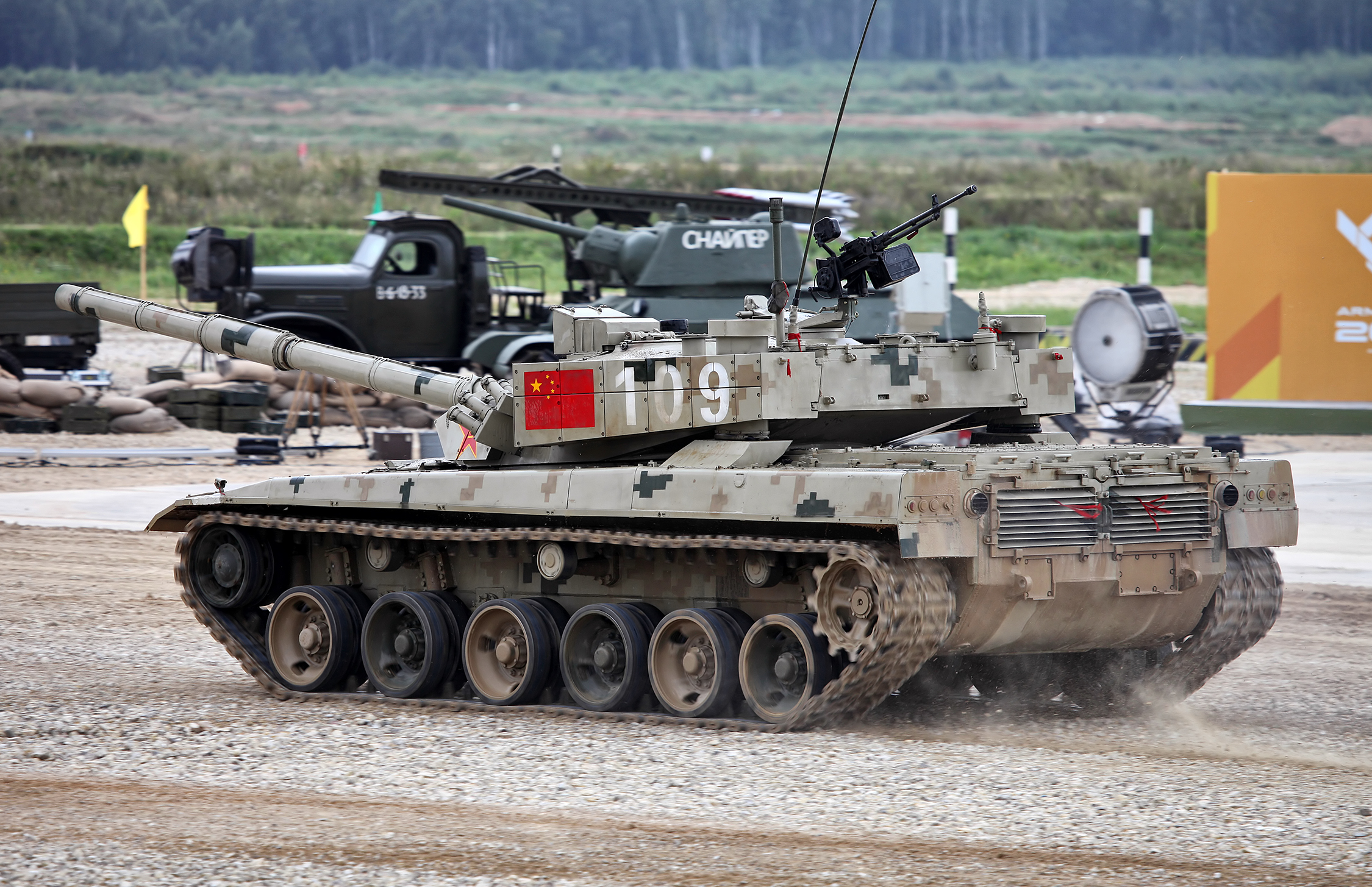
Rear side of the Type 96B.

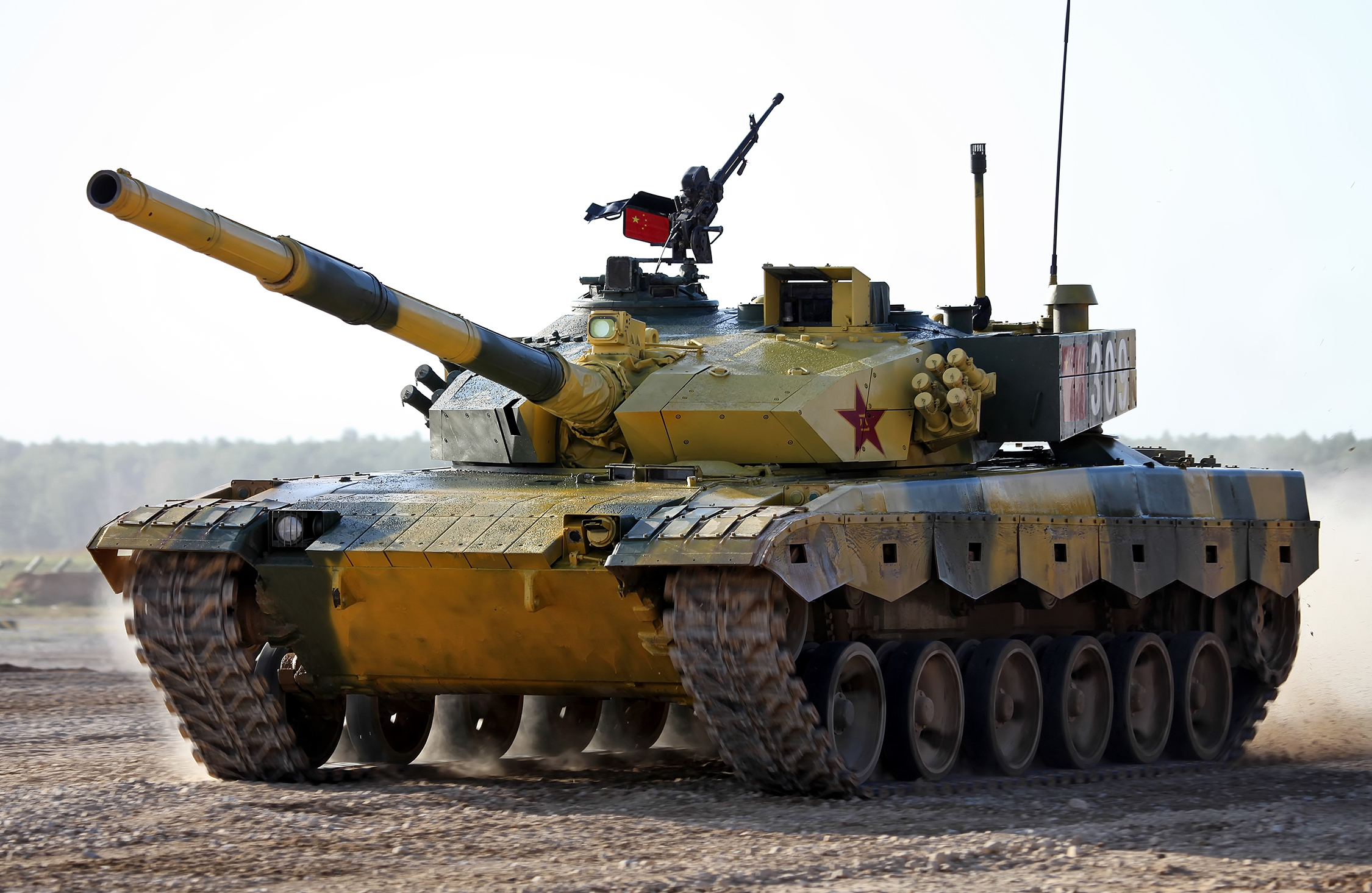
Type 96B in Tank Biathlon themed camouflage paint

== See also ==
Related Development

- Tanks in China
- Type 88 tank
- Type 99 tank, a Chinese third-generation main battle tank.
- Type 15 tank

Comparable ground systems

- T-64BM – (Soviet Union)
- T-72B3M – (Soviet Union)
- Al-Khalid – (China, Pakistan)
- T-90 – (Soviet Union, Russia)
- PT-91 Twardy – (Poland)
- Oplot – (Ukraine)
- M1 Abrams – (United States)
