= List of equipment of the People's Liberation Army Ground Force =

This is a list of military equipment in service with the People's Liberation Army Ground Force, either presently, or former equipment that has since been replaced.

== Individual equipment ==
| Name | Type | Origin | Image | Notes |
Uniform and gears
| Type 21 uniform | Combat uniform Field uniform | China | | Fitted with Xingkong series camouflage. |
| Type 19 combat uniform | Combat uniform | China | | Fitted with Xingkong series camouflage. |
| Type 19 backpack | Assault pack Large rucksack | China | | Fitted with Xingkong series camouflage. |
| Type 19 individual carrying system | Bulletproof vest Webbing equipment | China | | Featuring Kevlar lining and slot for ballistic plates. Fitted with Xingkong series camouflage. |
| Type 17 combat boots | Combat boot | China | | In service. Replaced Type 07 combat boots. |
| Type 15 heavy bulletproof vest | Bulletproof vest Webbing equipment | China | | In service. Featuring integrated webbing equipment and slot for ballistic plates. |
| Type 07 uniform | Combat uniform Dress uniform | China | | Including Type 07 dress uniform, Type 07 parka jacket, etc. Fitted with Type 07 series camouflage. |
| Type 06 bulletproof vest | Bulletproof vest Webbing equipment | China | | In active service, featuring integrated webbing equipment and slot for ballistic plates. |
| QGF-11 | Combat helmet | China | | In service. |
| QGF-03 | Combat helmet | China | | In service. |
Electronics
| Individual combat system | Personal computer terminal/battle management system | China | | Tactical information system, including a tablet with camera, and multifunctional night-vision goggles. Soldiers can mark and conduct identification friend or foe (IFF) through the goggles.The Information system carried by each soldier can also send back information to the command center, which is able to track the soldiers movements and give instructions to the soldiers in real time. |
Other equipment
| QNL-95 | Bayonet | China | | |
| Type 20 bedding gears | Military bedding | China | | Including Type 20 individual sleeping bag, Type 20 winter camouflage coat, Type 20 winter boots, Type 20 down jacket, Type 20 parka jacket. |
| Type 19 military gears | eyeglasses and other accessories. | China | | Including Type 19 glasses, gloves, underwear, puttee, boonie hat, socks, canteen kit, mess kit, etc. |
| Type 17 individual tent | Tent | China | | Fitted with IR blocking material. |
| FZD-04/A/B | Chemical reconnaissance device | China | | Equipped with the Army chemical defense troops. |
| BBG011A | Night-vision device | China | | In service. |

== Small arms and light weapons ==
=== Small arms ===
| Name | Type | Cartridge | Origin | Image | Notes |
Handgun
| QSZ-92A/B/193 | Semi-automatic pistol | 9×19mm Parabellum; 5.8×21mm DAP92 | China | | New generation of the Compact/Subcompact/pocket pistols based on the QSZ-92, designed for special forces and military officers. 7- to 15-round magazine. |
| QSZ-11 | Semi-automatic pistol | 5.8×21mm DAP92 | China | | Compact version of QSZ-92-5.8mm. 8-round magazine. Designed for military officers, pilots and special forces. |
| QSW-06 | Suppressed pistol | 5.8×21mm DCV05 or 5.8×21mm DAP92 | China | | In active service. 20-round magazine. Used by the Special Forces. Replaced the Type 67. |
| QSZ-92 | Semi-automatic pistol | 5.8×21mm DAP92 or 9×19mm Parabellum | China | | In active service. 15 or 20-round magazines. Improved variants are called QSZ-92A/B. |
Nonlinear line of sight weapon
| HD-66 | Nonlinear line of sight weapons | 9×19mm Parabellum | China | | It uses the QSZ-92 as the main pistol, and is an equivalent to the Israeli CornerShot. |
| CF-06 | Nonlinear line of sight weapons | 9×19mm Parabellum | China | | It uses the QSZ-92 as the main pistol, and is an equivalent to the Israeli CornerShot. |
Submachine gun
| QCQ-171 | Submachine gun | 9×19mm Parabellum | China | | In service since 2019. |
| QCW-05 | Bullpup personal defense weapon | 5.8×21mm DAP92 | China | | 50-round magazine. Suppressor is detachable. |
| QCQ-05 | Bullpup submachine gun | 9×19mm Parabellum | China | | Derived from QCW-05 |
| Type 79 | Submachine gun | 7.62×25mm Tokarev | China | | 20-round magazine. Limited service. |
Assault rifles
| QBZ-191 | Assault rifle | 5.8×42mm | China | | Standard service rifle. Equipped with QMK-152 3x scope, unveiled in 2019. |
| QTS-11 | Assault rifle Airburst grenade launcher | 5.8×42mm / 20mm airburst grenade | China | | 20-round magazine and single shot, bolt action 20mm grenade launcher. An equivalent to the American XM29 OICW. It is a variant of the QBZ-03 assault rifle. |
| QBZ-95-1 | Bullpup assault rifle | 5.8×42mm DBP87 | China | | 30-round magazine or 75-round drum magazine. Phasing out of service. |
| QBS-06 | Underwater assault rifle | 5.8×42mm DBS06 | China | | 24-round magazine. |
| QBZ-03 | Assault rifle | 5.8×42mm DBP87 | China | | 30-round magazine. Limited service with the reserve, garrison, border patrol PLAGF units. |
| QBZ-95 | Bullpup assault rifle | 5.8×42mm DBP87 | China | | Standard service rifle. 30-round magazine or 75-round drum magazine. Phasing out of service. |
| Type 81 | Assault rifle | 7.62×39mm M43 | China | | 30-round magazine or 75-round drum magazine. Limited service in the Reserve Forces and militia. Based on elements from the Dragunov, SKS, and AK-47/ AKM series rifles. |
Carbine
| QBZ-192 | Carbine | 5.8×42mm | China | | Carbine version of the QBZ-191. |
| QBZ-95B-1 | Carbine | 5.8×42mm | China | | Carbine version of the QBZ-95. |
| QBZ-95B | Carbine | 5.8×42mm | China | | Carbine version of the QBZ-95. |
| Type 56 carbine | Semi-automatic carbine | 7.62×39mm M43 | China | | Used in ceremonial role or reserve training. 10-round internal magazine. Deactivated, use as the ceremonial rifle. Based on the SKS. |
Shotguns
| QBA-221 | Fully-automatic shotgun | 18.4 mm shotshell | China | | Fully-automatic shotgun designed for close-quarter raids and anti-drone defense. |
| QBS-09 | Semi-automatic shotgun | 18.4 mm shotshell | China | | Semi-automatic combat shotgun developed for the PLA Ground Force. |
| Type 97 | Pump-action shotgun | 18.4 mm shotshell | China | | Pump-action shotgun. PLAGF uses a magazine-fed version. |
Designated marksman rifle
| QBU-191 | Selective fire designated marksman rifle | 5.8×42mm | China | | 30-round box magazine. Automatic fire mode is retained. |
| QBU-88 | Bullpup semi-automatic rifle | 5.8×42mm | China | | 10-round box magazine, effective range, 500 -1000m |
Sniper rifles
| QBU-203 (CS/LR35) | Bolt-action sniper rifle | 7.62×51mm | China | | 5-round box magazine. |
| QBU-202 (CS/LR35) | Bolt-action sniper rifle | 8.6x70mm | China | | 5-round box magazine. |
| QBU-141 (CS/LR3) | Bolt-action sniper rifle | 5.8×42mm | China | | 5.8mm variant of the CS/LR4 with 10-round box magazine. |
| CS/LR4 (NSG-1) | Bolt action rifle | 7.62×51mm CS/DFL3 | China | | |
Anti-materiel rifles
| QBU-201 | Anti-materiel precision rifle | 12.7×108mm | China | | 5-round box magazine. In service with PLA. |
| QBU-10 | Semi-automatic anti-materiel rifle | 12.7×108mm | China | | 5-round box magazine. In service with PLA. |
| QBU-99 | Semi-automatic anti-materiel rifle | 12.7×108mm | China | | The M99B, a bullpup variant, is also produced. |
| AMR-2 | Bolt-action anti-materiel rifle | 12.7×108mm | China | | |
Light machine guns and light support weapons (LMG/LSW)
| QJS-161/QJB-201 | Light machine gun | 5.8×42mm | China | | 100-round and 150-round belt container. |
| QBB-95 | Bullpup light support weapon | 5.8×42mm DBP87 | China | | 30-round magazine or 75-round drum magazine. Light support weapon variant of the QBZ-95. |
| QJY-88 | Light machine gun | 5.8×42mm DBP87 | China | | 100, 200-round magazine or belt. Replaced the Type 67 general-purpose machine gun. |
| Type 81 LMG | Light machine gun | 7.62×39mm M43 | China | | 75-round drum magazine. Light machine gun variant of the Type 81 assault rifle. |
General-purpose machine guns (GPMG)
| QJY-201 | General-purpose machine gun | 7.62×51mm NATO 7.62×51mm DPM-201 | China | | |
Heavy machine guns (HMG)
| QJZ-171 | Heavy machine gun | 12.7×108mm | China | | Ultra-lightweight heavy machine gun for firepower platoon. Replacing QJZ-89. |
| QJG-02 | Heavy machine gun | 14.5×114mm | China | | Also called the Type 02 anti-aircraft gun. Emplacement. |
| QJZ-89 | Heavy machine gun | 12.7×108mm | China | | Lightweight heavy machine gun for firepower platoon. |
| QJC-88 | Heavy machine gun | 12.7×108mm | China | | |
| QJG-85 | Heavy machine gun | 12.7×108mm | China | | Emplacement. |

=== Grenades, explosives, and missiles ===
| Name | Type | Caliber | Origin | Image | Notes |
Rocket launchers
| PF-11 | Disposable Rocket launcher | 93mm | China | | Developed from PF-97. Warheads include HEAT (DZP151), HE-Frag (DZS151), HEAT-MP Bunker Assault (DZG141), Smoke (DZF151), Thermobaric, incendiary, etc |
| DZJ-08 | Disposable recoilless launcher | 80mm | China | | |
| PF-98 | Multipurpose Rocket launcher | 120mm | China | | |
| PF-97 | Disposable Rocket launcher | 93mm | China | | Chinese copy of the RPO-A Shmel. |
| PF-89 | Disposable Rocket launcher | 80mm | China | | |
| FHJ-01 | Double-barreled incendiary rocket launcher | 62mm | China | | |
| Type 69 RPG | Rocket-propelled grenade | 40mm | China | | Chinese variant of Russian RPG-7 (Phasing out) |
Anti-tank guided missiles
| HJ-20/50 | Anti-tank guided missile | | China | | |
| HJ-16 | Anti-tank guided missile | Tandem shaped charge HEAT | China | | Universal light-weight anti-tank guided missile. Pre- or post-launch lock on with top attack capability. Developed from QN-502C missile. |
| HJ-13 | Anti-tank guided missile | | China | | |
| HJ-12 | Anti-tank guided missile | Tandem shaped charge HEAT | China | | Fire and forget, man-portable ATGM similar to FGM-148 Javelin. |
| HJ-11 | Anti-tank guided missile | Tandem shaped charge HEAT | China | | Man-portable missile launcher improved from HJ-8. |
| HJ-8 | Anti-tank guided missile | 120mm | China | | |
| HJ-73D | Anti-tank guided missile | 125mm | China | | Upgrade of the original HJ-73. Chinese development of the 9M14 Malyutka. |
Man-portable air-defense systems
| QN-202 | Man-portable air-defense system | 40 mm | China | | Micro missile designed to engage drones, helicopters, light vehicles, and fortifications. |
| QW-4 | Man-portable air-defense system | 72 mm | China | | 72 mm Man-portable air-defense system (MANPADS) with imaging infrared homing. |
| HN-6B | Man-portable air-defense system | 72 mm | China | | 72 mm Man-portable air-defense system (MANPADS) with quasi-imaging infrared homing. |
| QW-3 | Man-portable air-defense system | 72 mm | China | | 72 mm Man-portable air-defense system (MANPADS) with semi-active laser homing. |
| HN-6 | Man-portable air-defense system | 72 mm | China | | 72 mm Man-portable air-defense system (MANPADS) with dual-band infrared homing. |
| QW-2 | Man-portable air-defense system | 72 mm | China | | 72 mm Man-portable air-defense system (MANPADS) with dual-band infrared homing. |
Grenade launchers
| QLZ-201 | Automatic grenade launcher | 35x32mm | China | | Crew-served AGL. Uses a 50-round ammo box. Successor to QLZ-04. |
| QLU-11 | Semi-automatic direct-fire programmable grenade launcher | 35x32mm | China | | Uses drum magazines with high-precision airburst ammunition |
| QLG-10 | Under-barrel grenade launcher | 35x32mm | China | | Designed to be mounted onto QBZ-95, QBZ-95-1, and QBZ-95B-1. |
| QLB-06 | Semi-automatic grenade launcher | 35x32mm | China | | Semi-automatic variant of the QLZ-87, with a redesigned action. |
| QLZ-04 | Automatic grenade launcher | 35x32mm | China | | |
| QLZ-87 | Automatic grenade launcher | 35x32mm | China | | |
| QLG-91 | Under-barrel grenade launcher | 35x115mm | China | | Designed to be mounted onto a Type 56 assault rifle. Later variants can be used with the Type 81, Type 87, and QBZ-95. |
| QLT-89 | grenade discharger | 50mm | China | | Handheld grenade discharger / lightweight mortar. |
| DFR-89 | incendiary grenade discharger | 35mm | China | | Handheld grenade launcher for white phosphorus munitions. Reverse-engineered DM34. |
Rifle grenades
| Type 90 | Rifle grenade | 40 mm | China | | 40 mm rifle grenades for the Type 81 assault rifle, Type 87 assault rifle, and QBZ-95. Variants include DQP1 HEAT, DQS1 HE-Frag, DQR1 incendiary, DQF1 smoke, DQJ03 HEDP multipurpose. |
Hand grenades
| DSS-161 | Frag grenade | | China | | Fragmentation grenade |
| DSY-151 | Thermobaric blast grenade | | China | | Thermobaric grenade |
| DSB-151 | Flashbang | | China | | Flash and stun grenade |
| DRH-181/183 | Stun grenade | | China | | Stun grenade |
| DSR-161 | Incendiary grenade | | China | | Incendiary grenade |
| DSF-161 | Smoke grenade | | China | | Smoke grenade |
| FSL-02 | Smoke grenade | | China | | |
| Type 86 | Frag grenade | | China | | |
| Type 82–2 | Frag grenade | | China | | |
Mines
| GLD-260 anti-tank mine | Anti-tank mine | Tripwire, Pressure | China | | Third-generation Chinese anti-tank mine. Manually laid. Vibration or pressure triggered. |
| GLD-230 anti-tank mine | Anti-tank mine | Tripwire | China | | Third-generation Chinese anti-tank mine. Manually laid. Off-route mine with infrared, sound, and vibration sensors. |
| GLD-224 anti-tank mine | Anti-tank mine | Pressure | China | | Third-generation Chinese anti-tank mine. Rocket or air-dispersed scatterable. Magnetic and pressure sensor. |
| GLD-151 anti-personnel mine | Anti-personnel mine | Tripwire, Command | China | | Third-generation Chinese anti-personnel mine. Manually laid. Directional. |
| GLD-150 anti-personnel mine | Anti-personnel mine | Tripwire, Command | China | | Third-generation Chinese anti-personnel mine. Manually laid. Directional. |
| GLD-132 anti-personnel mine | Anti-personnel mine | Tripwire, Command, Pressure | China | | Third-generation Chinese anti-personnel mine. Manually laid. Jumping mine. |
| GLD-125 anti-personnel mine | Anti-personnel mine | Pressure | China | | Third-generation Chinese anti-personnel mine. Rocket or air-dispersed scatterable. |
| GLD-121 anti-personnel mine | Anti-personnel mine | Tripwire, Pressure | China | | Third-generation Chinese anti-personnel mine. Manually laid. Electronic anti-handling device. |
| GLD-115 anti-personnel mine | Anti-personnel mine | Pressure | China | | Third-generation Chinese anti-personnel mine. Rocket or air-dispersed scatterable. |
| GLD-112 anti-personnel mine | Anti-personnel mine | Tripwire, Pressure | China | | Third-generation Chinese anti-personnel mine. Manually laid. |
| Type 85 mine | Anti-tank mine | Pressure | China | | Chinese plastic-cased circular anti-tank blast mine, improved from the Type 72 anti-tank mine. (Phased out) |
| Type 84 mine | Anti-tank mine | Pressure | China | | Chinese rocket or air-dispersed scatterable anti-tank mine; magnetic proximity fuze. (Phased out) |
| Type 81 mine | Anti-tank mine | Pressure | China | | Chinese rocket or air-dispersed scatterable anti-tank mine; anti-mine clearing design (Phased out) |
| Type 81 signal mine | Signal mine | Tripwire, Pressure | China | | Chinese non-lethal sound and light signal mines, which launch two signals after tripping (Phased out) |
| Type 72 plastic mine | Anti-tank mine | Pressure | China | | Chinese plastic-cased circular anti-tank blast mine, it is similar to the Russian TM-46 mine. Improved from the Type 69 anti-tank mine. (Phased out) |
| Type 72 metallic mine | Anti-tank mine | Pressure | China | | Chinese metal-cased circular anti-tank blast mine, it is similar to the Russian TM-46 mine. The mine has a central plastic-cased, blast-resistant fuze. Improved from the Type 69 anti-tank mine. (Phased out) |
| Type 72 anti-personnel jumping mine | Anti-personnel mine | Tripwire, Command, Pressure | China | | Second-generation Chinese jumping mine, improved from the Type 69 anti-personnel mine, used in the Sino-Vietnamese War. (Phased out) |
| Type 72 anti-personnel mine | Anti-personnel mine | Tripwire, Pressure | China | | Second-generation Chinese anti-personnel mine, circular plastic mine used by both sides during the Sino-Vietnamese War. (Phased out) |

=== Mortars and recoilless rifles ===
| Name | Type | Quantity | Origin | Image | Notes |
Mortars
| PBP-201 (Type 201) | 60 mm mortar | Uknown | China | | In service. 60 mm lightweight mortar deployed by PLAGF firepower platoons. It features an improved trigger, a laser rangefinder, an integrated fire control unit, and a reflex sight. |
| PBP-172 (Type 172) | 120 mm mortar | | China | | In service. 120 mm mortar deployed by light infantry battalion firepower companies. |
| PP-93 mortar (Type 93) | 60 mm mortar | | China | | Lightweight 60 mm mortar for the PLAGF mountain and air assault infantry units. PP-89 with an extended barrel for a longer range. Replaced Cold War-era Type 63. Phasing out and being replaced by the PBP-201. |
| PP-89 mortar (Type 89) | 60 mm mortar | | China | | Lightweight 60 mm mortar for the PLAGF regular infantry units. Replaced Cold War-era Type 63. Phasing out and being replaced by the PBP-201. |
| PP-89-100 mortar (Type 89-100) | 100 mm mortar | | China | | In service. 100 mm mortar deployed by the PLAGF regiment-level firepower companies. Replaced Cold War-era Type 71. |
| PP-87 (Type 87) | 82 mm mortar | 2,880 | China | | In service. 82 mm mortar deployed by the PLAGF battalion-level firepower companies. Replaced Cold War-era Type 67. |
| W86 (Type 86) | 120 mm mortar | | China | | Improved from the Type 64. Due to weight issue, it was only produced by limited quantity for the PLA, and many units chose the lighter Type 87 82 mm and Type 89 100 mm mortars instead. Phasing out in 2010 and being replaced by the PBP-172. |
Recoilless rifles
| PF-78 | 82 mm recoilless gun | 3,966 | China | | 82 mm smoothbore recoilless gun improved from the PF-65, designed to provide a rapid, direct fire support to infantry against hard targets such as light tanks, armoured vehicles, and bunkers. It was replaced by the PF-98 120 mm shoulder-launched anti-tank weapons |
| PF-75 | 105 mm recoilless rifle | | China | | 105 mm recoilless rifle based on the M40 recoilless rifle. |

=== Other ===
==== Export-oriented ====
- CF98, semi-automatic pistol, 9×19mm Parabellum, Export version of the QSZ-92.
- CF98A, semi-automatic pistol, 9×19mm Parabellum, Export version of the QSZ-92. Improved CF98.
- BJC-16, submachine gun, 9×19mm Parabellum, internal bid competitor to the CS/LS7.
- JH-16, submachine gun, 9×19mm Parabellum, internal bid competitor to the CS/LS7.
- CS/LM4, medium machine gun 7.62×51mm NATO. Export version of the Type 80 machine gun but in NATO caliber. Based on the PKMS.
- CS/LM11, light machine gun, 5.56×45mm NATO, Export-oriented.
- CS/LM12, gatling gun, 7.62×54mmR, Export-oriented.
- CS/LM20, light machine gun, 5.8×42mm, export version of the QJB-201.
- CS/LM21, light machine gun, 5.56×45mm, export version of the QJB-201 in NATO round.
- CS/LM22, medium machine gun, 7.62×51mm, export version of the QJY-201.
- CS/LP6 (QX-4), semi-automatic pistol, modular design based on the QSZ-92. It can be chambered in 9×19mm Luger, .45 ACP, 7.62×25mm Tokarev and .40 S&W.
- CS/LP9, revolver, based on the ZLS-05 police revolver but chambered in .357 Magnum.
- CS/LR3, bolt-action, sniper rifle. Export version of the QBU-141.
- CS/LR4, bolt-action, 7.62×51mm
- CS/LR17, modular rifle
- CS/LR19, 7.62×54mmR. Derived from the Dragunov sniper rifle.
- CS/LR24, bolt-action, 7.62×51mm
- CS/LR35, bolt-action, 7.62×51mm
- CS/LR41, assault rifle, 5.8×42mm, export version of the QBZ-191.
- CS/LR41A, carbine, 5.8×42mm, export version of the QBZ-192.
- CS/LR41B, marksman rifle, 5.8×42mm, export version of the QBU-191.
- CS/LR42, assault rifle, 5.56×45mm NATO, export version of the QBZ-191.
- CS/LR42A, carbine, 5.56×45mm NATO, export version of the QBZ-192.
- CS/LR43, assault rifle, 7.62×39mm, export version of the QBZ-191.
- CS/LR43A, carbine, 7.62×39mm, export version of the QBZ-192.
- CS/LR44, marksman rifle, 7.62×51mm NATO, export version of the QBU-191.
- CS/LS2, 9×19mm Parabellum
- CS/LS3, 9×19mm Parabellum
- CS/LS5, 9×19mm Parabellum
- CS/LS6, 9×19mm Parabellum, 50-round magazine. Used by the People's Armed Forces. Limited service.
- CS/LS7, 9×19mm Parabellum
- CS/LG1 (LG2), 40mm underbarrel grenade launcher
- CS/LG2, 40mm grenade machine gun
- CS/LW1, 38mm anti-riot revolver grenade launcher, designed for special 38mm non-lethal ammo.
- CS/LW3, 38mm anti-riot underbarrel grenade launcher, designed for special 38mm non-lethal ammo. Variants include Type A for the Type 81 assault rifle and Type B for the QBZ-95.
- JS 7.62, bolt-action, sniper rifle, 7.62×54mmR.
- JS 12.7 (JS05), bolt-action, anti-material sniper rifle, 12.7×108mm.
- W03', bolt-action, anti-material sniper rifle, 12.7×108mm.
- M2010, 10mm less-lethal revolver for police use.
- NP22, 9×19mm Parabellum pistol for export, based on the Sig Sauer P226.
- NP22A, 9×19mm Parabellum pistol for export, based on the P226. NP22 with better finish.
- NP27, .45 ACP pistol for export, based on the M1911A1.
- NP28, 9×19mm Parabellum for export, based on the M1911. 10- and 15-round double-stack magazine.
- NP29, 9×19mm Parabellum for export, based on the M1911. 9-round magazine.
- NP30, .45 ACP pistol for export, based on the M1911. 10-round double-stack magazine.
- NP34, 9×19mm Parabellum pistol for export, based on the P228.
- NP44, .45 ACP pistol for export, based on the M1911. 14-round double-stack magazine.
- NP56, .45 ACP pistol for export, based on the P220.
- NP58, .40 S&W pistol for export, based on the P226.
- NZ75, 9×19mm Parabellum pistol for export, a copy of the CZ 75B, specifically it's modeled after the Italian Tanfoglio TZ-75.
- NZ85, 9×19mm Parabellum pistol for export, a copy of the CZ 85.
- SDM XM9, 9x21mm IMI for export, based on the NP22.
- LP3, 9×19mm Parabellum pistol for export, NP22 with manual safety added.
- LP4, 9×19mm Parabellum pistol for export, NP34 with manual safety added.
- PX-3 (NP762), 7.62×25mm pistol for export.
- ZLS-05 Police Revolver (NP-216), 9×19mm Parabellum revolver for police usage. Export name NP-216. Variants include the NRP9 revolver chambered in .38 Special.

==== Reserve and retired ====
- Type 51 pistol, semi-automatic, 7.62×25mm Tokarev. Based on the TT-33. China's first standard pistol after WWII. The Type 51 was virtually identical to the TT-33, except for the Chinese markings on the left rear of the frame or on the top of the slide (phased out).
- Type 54 pistol, semi-automatic, 7.62×25mm Tokarev. Based on the TT pistol and Type 51 pistol. Nicknamed Black Star
- Type 59 pistol, semi-automatic, 9×18mm Makarov. Based on the Makarov pistol. Limited service.
- Type 64 pistol, semi-automatic, 7.62×17mm Type 64.
- Type 64 pistol, 7.65×17mm rimless ball. Has an integral suppressor. Used by Special Forces.
- Type 67 pistol, 7.65×17mm rimless ball. Has an integral suppressor. Used by Special Forces. Improved variant of the Type 64 silenced pistol.
- Type 77 pistol, semi-automatic, 7.62×17mm or 9×19mm Parabellum. Phasing out.
- Type 80 pistol, automatic, 7.62×25mm Tokarev. Designated for military officers.
- Type 84 pistol, semi-automatic, 7.62×17mm Type 64. Small pistol for security and police forces.
- Type 50 submachine gun, 7.62×25mm Type 51. Chinese copy of the PPSh-41.
- Type 54 submachine gun, 7.62×25mm Type 51. Chinese copy of the PPS-43.
- Type 64 submachine gun, 7.62×25mm Type 51. Has an integral suppressor. Limited service in the Special Forces.
- Type 82 submachine gun, 9×18mm Makarov. Based on the Polish FB PM-63 captured from Vietnam. Limited service in the Special Forces.
- Type 85 submachine gun, 7.62×25mm Type 51. Has an integral suppressor. Used by recon units and special forces. Replaced by QCW-05.
- Type 56 assault rifle, 7.62×39mm M43. Serving in the Militia, Reserve Forces, and limited service in the Special Forces. Based on the AK-47/ AKM.
- Type 63 assault rifle, 7.62×39mm M43. First indigenously designed Chinese automatic rifle.
- Type 87 assault rifle, 5.8×42mm. Experimental rifle based on the Type 81 assault rifle for testing the 5.8×42mm ammunition.
- Type 53 carbine, 7.62×54mmR. First standardized PRC rifle, based on the Mosin–Nagant carbine.
- Type 56C carbine, 7.62×39mm M43. Last Chinese military AK to enter service.
- Type 79 sniper rifle, 7.62×54mmR. Derived from the Dragunov sniper rifle.
- Type 85 sniper rifle, 7.62×54mmR. Improved Type 79 SVD.
- Type 56 light machine gun, 7.62×39mm M43 light machine gun. A copy of the RPD machine gun
- Type 56-5 squad machine gun, 7.62×39mm M43 squad machine gun. A copy of the RPK
- Type 53 machine gun, 7.62×54mmR medium machine gun. Derived from the Degtyaryov machine gun
- Type 58 machine gun, 7.62×54mmR medium machine gun. Derived from the RP-46
- Type 67 machine gun, 7.62×54mmR medium machine gun. First Chinese indigenously designed machine gun. Replaced the Type 53 (SG-43) and Type 57 (SGM) machine guns.
- Type 80 machine gun, 7.62×54mmR medium machine gun. Based on the PKMS. 100, 200, or 250-round magazines.
- Type 86 coaxial machine gun, 7.62×54mmR. vehicle coaxial machine based on the Type 80 machine gun.
- Type 53 heavy machine gun, 7.62×54mmR medium/heavy machine gun. Derived from the SG-43 Goryunov
- Type 57 heavy machine gun, 7.62×54mmR medium/heavy machine gun. Derived from the SGM heavy machine-gun
- Type 59 tank machine gun', 7.62×54mmR medium/heavy machine gun. Derived from the SGMT tank machine gun.
- Type 54 heavy machine gun, 12.7×108mm emplacement heavy machine gun towed. Derived from the DShK.
- Type 54-1 heavy machine gun, 12.7×108mm emplacement heavy machine gun on tripod. Derived from the DShK.
- Type 56 heavy machine gun, 14.5×114mm emplacement heavy machine gun. Chinese copy of the KPV heavy machine gun.
- Type 58 heavy machine gun, 14.5×114mm. Vehicle-mounted heavy machine gun. Chinese copy of the KPVT.
- Type 75 heavy machine gun, 14.5×114mm. Emplacement of a heavy machine gun, a towed Type 58. Chinese copy of the ZPU.
- Type 77 heavy machine gun, 12.7×108mm. Emplacement machine gun, featuring a hybrid recoil system.
- Type 58 flamethrower (FPH-01), thickened gasoline flamethrower, a copy of the Soviet LPO-50. Used for anti-trench and close-range anti-personnel warfare. Retired.
- Type 74 flamethrower (FPH-02), Thickened gasoline flamethrower, developed from the Type 58 flamethrower. Improved variants included FPH-02A and FPH-02B. Phased out.
- Type 56 rocket launcher, a copy of RPG-2.
- Type 70 rocket launcher, 62 mm, developed from the M72 LAW in the 1970s.
- Type 79 mini rocket launcher, handheld mini rocket launcher developed in the 1970s.
- FHJ-84, incendiary rocket launcher, 62 mm. Adopted in 1984 and replaced by FHJ-01.
- HJ-73, infantry portable or vehicle-mounted anti-tank missile, 125 mm. Wire-guided MCLOS and later SACLOS missile.
- HN-5, man-portable air-defense system, 72 mm. A reverse-engineered version of the Soviet Strela 2 (SA-7).
- HN-5A, man-portable air-defense system, 72 mm. A reverse-engineered version of the Soviet Strela 2M.
- QW-1, man-portable air-defense system, 72 mm. Developed from the HN-5, the configuration is either copied or derived from the Soviet 9K310 Igla-1 MANPADS.
- Type 67 rifle grenade, 70 mm rifle grenade produced in 1967 and saw combat in Sino-Soviet border conflict.
- Type 59 frag grenade, Chinese frag grenade. derivative of the Soviet RGD-5. Adopted in 1959
- Type 67 hand grenade, Chinese stick grenade
- Type 73 mini grenade, Chinese mini frag grenade
- Type 77 hand grenade, Chinese stick grenade
- Type 79 hand grenade, Chinese rocket-assisted hand grenade
- Type 82 hand grenade, Chinese hand grenade
- Type 58 anti-personnel mine, first-generation Chinese anti-personnel mine, a copy of the PMN mine.
- Type 58 anti-personnel stake mine, first-generation Chinese anti-personnel mine, a copy of the POMZ-2.
- Type 59 anti-personnel mine, first-generation Chinese anti-personnel mine, a copy of the POMZ-2M.
- Type 59 anti-tank mine, Chinese metal-cased circular anti-tank blast mine, it is similar to the Russian TM-46 mine.
- Type 66 mine, first-generation Chinese anti-personnel mine, directional anti-personnel mine, a copy of the Claymore mine.
- Type 69 anti-personnel mine, first-generation Chinese anti-personnel mine, anti-personnel bounding mine modeled after the M2 mine and S-mine.
- Type 69 anti-tank mine, Chinese metal-cased circular anti-tank blast mine, improved from the Type 59 anti-tank mine.
- Type 53 mortar, 82 mm mortar. A copy of the 82-BM-37 mortar.
- Type 53 mortar, 120 mm mortar. A copy of the 120-PM-43 mortar.
- Type 55 mortar, 120 mm mortar. A more robust but heavier version of the Type 53 developed by Norinco.
- Type 56 mortar, 160 mm mortar. Copy of the M-160 mortar.
- Type 63 mortar, 60 mm mortar. Company-level mortar. Retired. Replaced by the PP-89 and PP-93.
- Type 64 mortar, 120 mm mortar. Regiment-level mortar. Retired. Improved design and an upgrade to the Type 55. Replaced by 100 mm mortars in the 1980s due to weight issues.
- Type 67 mortar, 82 mm mortar. Battalion-level mortar. Retired. Replaced by the PP-87.
- Type 71 mortar, 100 mm mortar. Regiment-level mortar. Retired. Replaced by the PP-89-100.
- Type 84 mortar (W84), 82 mm mortar. Improved from the Type 67. Battalion-level mortar. Limited testing.
- Type 56 recoilless rifle (PF-56), 75 mm recoilless rifle. A copy of the M20 recoilless rifle.
- Type 65 recoilless gun (PF-65), 82 mm smoothbore recoilless gun based on the B-10 recoilless rifle. In service by 1965.
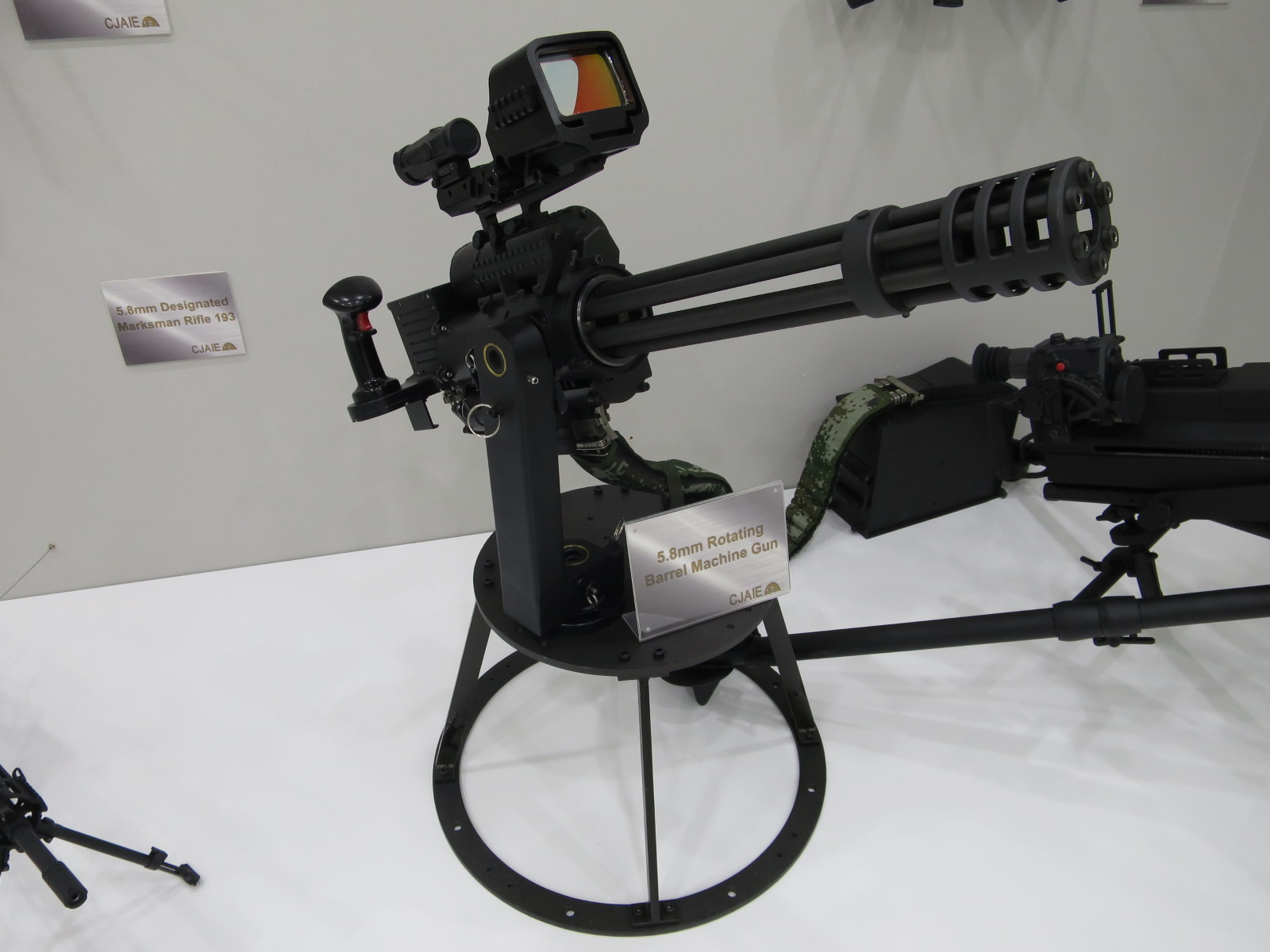
Chinese 5.8×42mm minigun for export

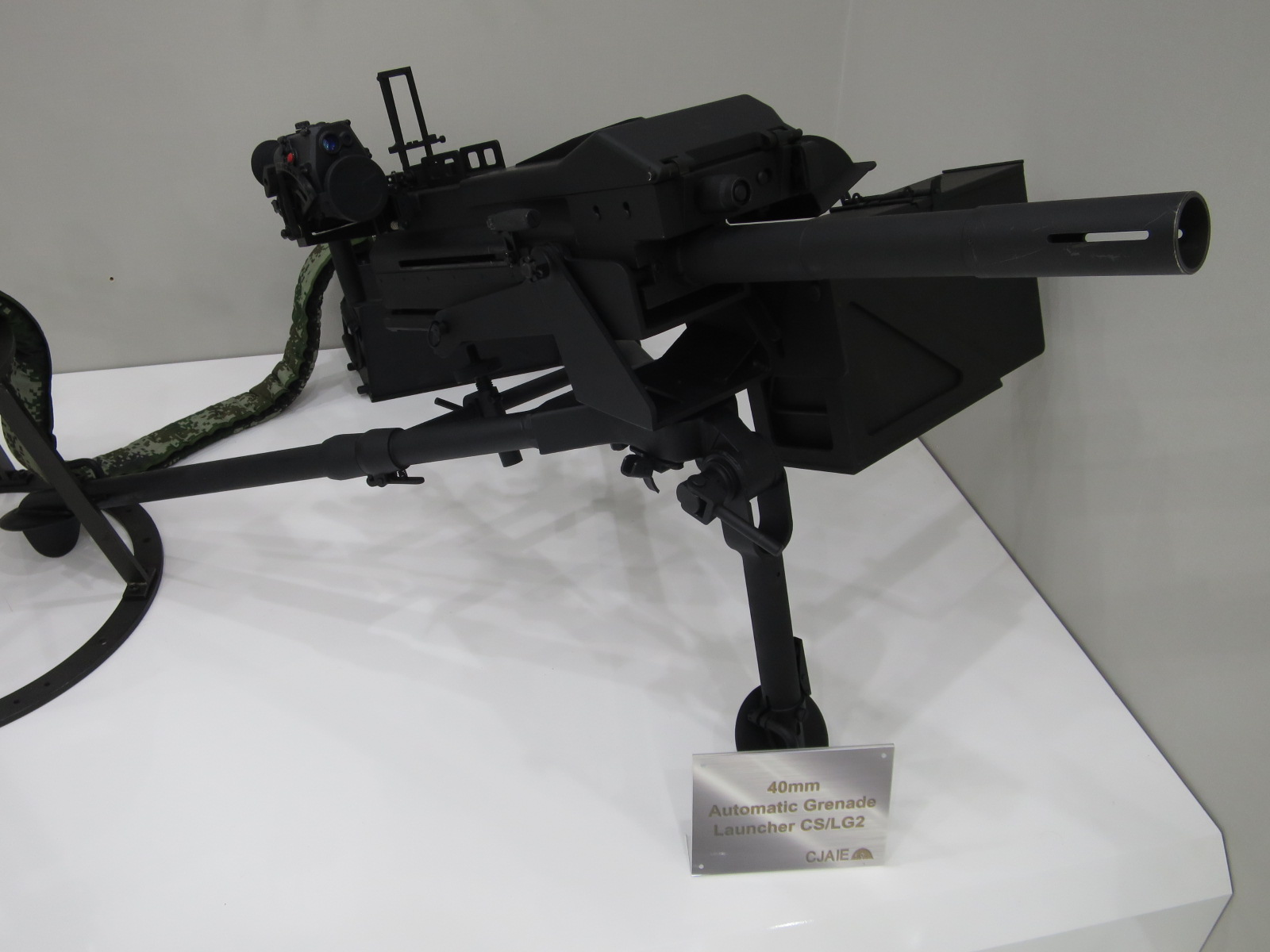
CS/LG2 grenade machine gun for export

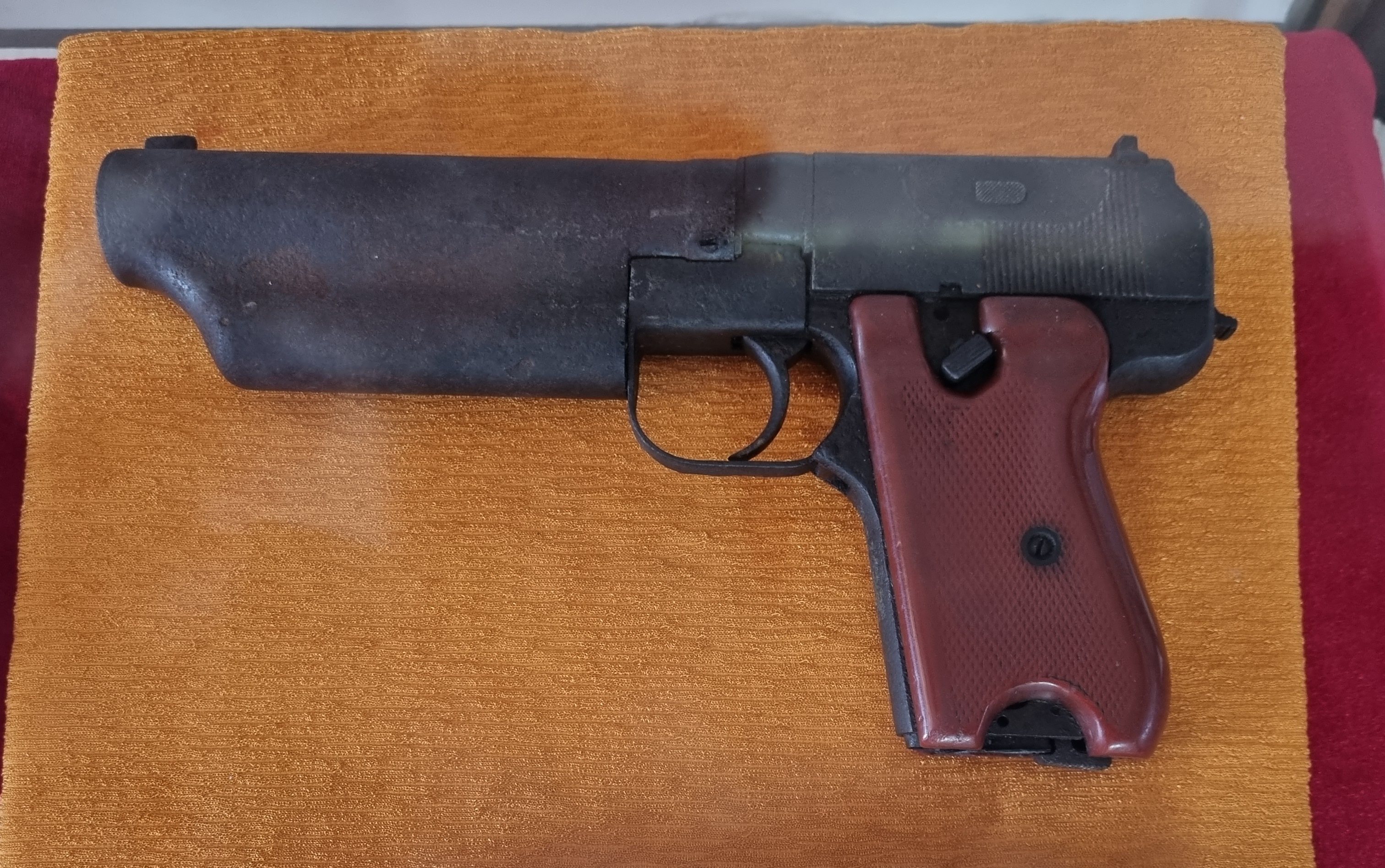
Type 64 integrally suppressed pistol

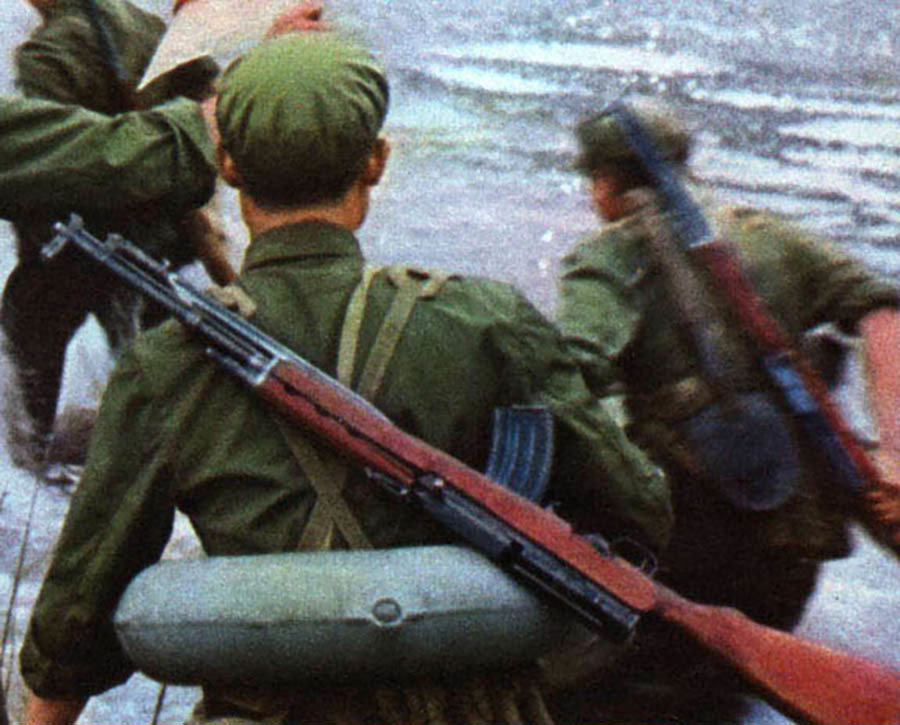
Type 63 rifle

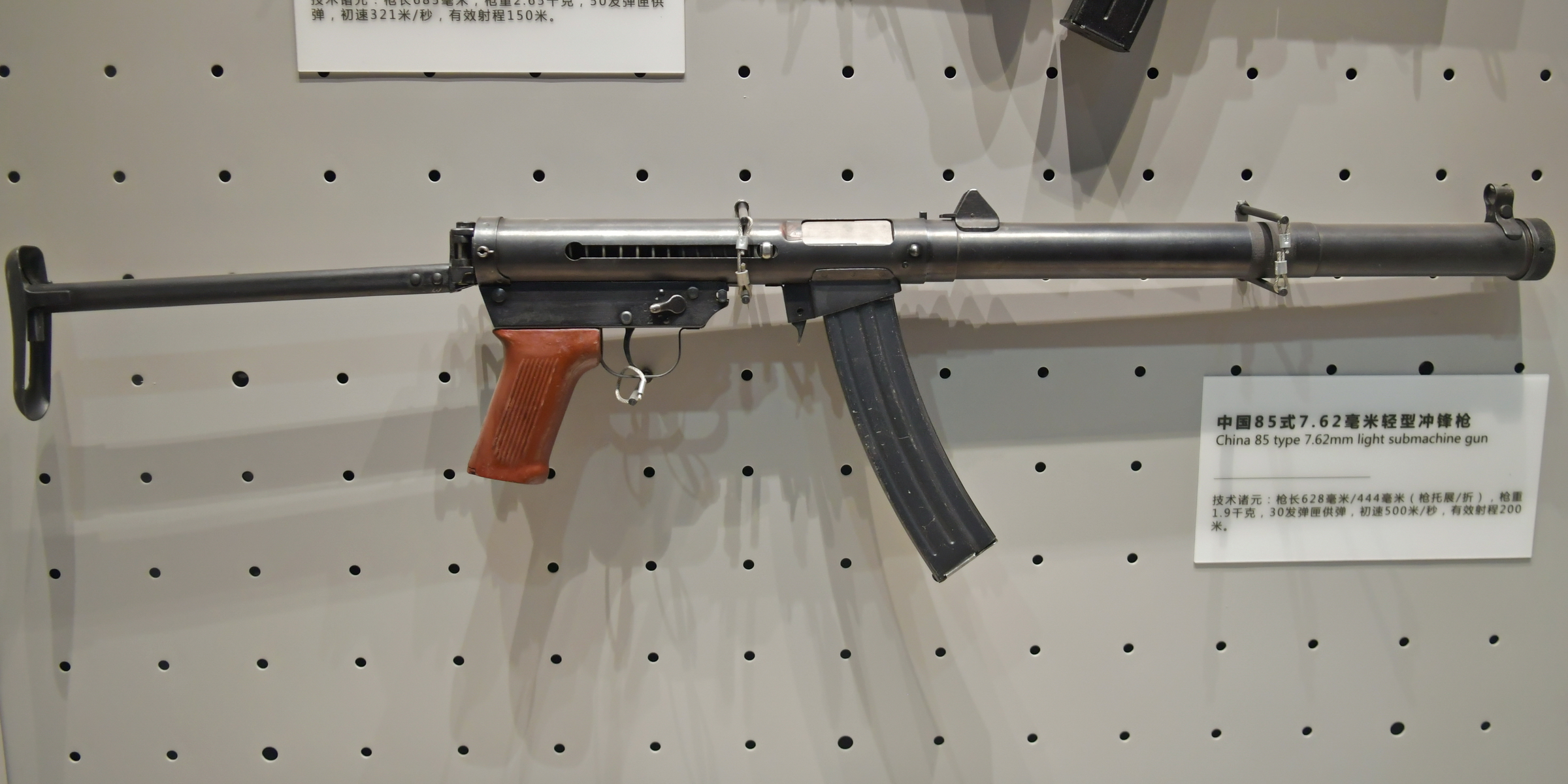
Type 85 integrally suppressed submachine gun

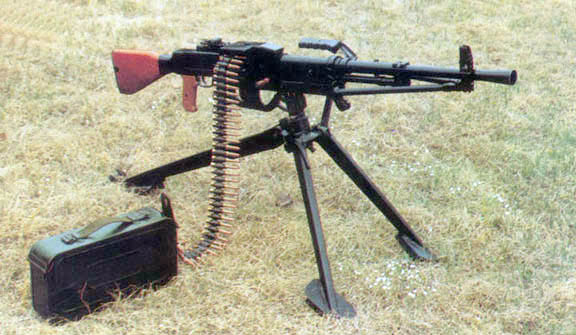
Type 67 machine gun

== Artillery ==
=== Gun artillery ===
| Name | Type | Quantity | Origin | Image | Notes |
Self-propelled howitzer (SPH): 3,240 (600 in reserve)
| PCL-181 | 155mm truck-mounted howitzer | 630 | China | | In service. 155mm howitzer mounted on the tracked chassis. Deployed to the PLAGF combined corps for attachment to heavy combined arms brigades. |
| PCL-171 | 122mm vehicle-mounted howitzer | 120 | China | | In service. 122mm howitzer mounted on the CTL181A assault vehicle chassis. Deployed to the PLAGF light high-mobility combined arms brigades. |
| PCL-161 | 122mm truck-mounted howitzer | 120 | China | | In service. 122mm howitzer mounted on the MV3 truck chassis. Deployed to the PLAGF light combined arms brigades. |
| PLL-09 | 122mm self-propelled wheeled howitzer | 600 | China | | In service. 122mm howitzer mounted on the Type 08 chassis. Deployed to the PLAGF medium combined arms brigades. |
| PCL-09 | 122mm truck-mounted howitzer | 300 | China | | Phasing out. 122mm howitzer mounted on the truck chassis. Deployed to the PLAGF motorized regiments. |
| PLZ-07A/B | 122mm self-propelled tracked howitzer | 700 | China | | PLZ-07B is amphibious capable. In service. 122mm howitzer mounted on the modified ZBD-04 or ZBD-05 chassis. Deployed to the PLAGF heavy and amphibious assault combined arms brigades. |
| PLZ-05 | 155mm self-propelled tracked howitzer | 320 | China | | In service. 155mm howitzer mounted on the tracked chassis. Deployed to the PLAGF combined corps for attachment to light and medium combined arms brigades. |
| PLZ-83A/B | 152mm self-propelled tracked howitzer | Active : 150 Reserve : 200 | | | |
| PLZ-89 | 122mm self-propelled tracked howitzer | Active : 300 Reserve : 400 | China | | Phasing out. Amphibious-capable, self-propelled tracked howitzer. Deployed to the PLAGF mechanized regiments. |
Towed howitzer: 900 (4,700 in reserve)
| PL-96 (D-30) | 122mm howitzer | 300 | Soviet Union/China | | |
| PL-59 (M-46) | 130mm howitzer | 100 | Soviet Union/China | | |
| PL-66 (D-20) | 152mm howitzer | 500 | Soviet Union/China | | |
| PL-54 (M-30) | 152mm howitzer | Reserve : 1700 | Soviet Union/China | | |
| PL-54-1 (M-30) | 122mm howitzer | Reserve : 3000 | Soviet Union/China | | |
Mortar carrier: 1250+
| CTL181A Mortar Carrier | 120mm vehicle-mounted mortar | Unknown | China | | In service. |
| PLZ-10 | 120mm self-propelled gun-mortar | 800 | China | | Gun-mortar variant of Type 89A infantry fighting vehicle. (In service) |
| PLL-05 | 120mm self-propelled gun-mortar | 450 | China | | |
| PCP-001 | 82mm automatic self-propelled gun-mortar | unknown | China | | In service |

=== Multiple rocket artillery ===
| Name | Type | Quantity | Origin | Image | Notes |
Multiple launch rocket system (MLRS)
| PHL-11 | 122mm multiple rocket launchers | 350 | China | | In service. 122mm truck-mounted MLRS. |
| PHL-20 (SR-7) | 122mm multiple rocket launchers | 30 | China | | In service. 122mm/220mm modular multiple launch rocket, based on the FAW MV3 assault vehicle chassis. |
| PHL-21 | 122mm multiple rocket launchers | 10+ | China | | In service. 122mm/220mm modular multiple launch rocket observed in PLAGF service, based on the Dongfeng Mengshi assault vehicle chassis. |
| PHL-81/90 | 122mm multiple rocket launchers | Active : 200 Reserve : 1,000 | China | | Phasing out. 122mm truck-mounted MLRS. |
| PHL-03 | 300mm multiple rocket launchers | 175 | China | | |
| PHL-16 | 370mm multiple rocket launchers | 120+ | China | | Modular 300mm/370mm/750mm ammunition system |
| PHZ-11 | 122mm multiple rocket launchers | 120 | China | | In service. 122mm tracked MLRS. |
| PHZ-89 | 122mm multiple rocket launchers | 375 | China | | Phasing out. 122mm tracked MLRS. Type 89s have been modified to include a cover for the 40-round rocket pack. Additionally, the left rear side layer of the launcher has a fully enclosed and armored compartment |
| PH-63 | 107mm multiple rocket launchers | 1,390+ | China | | |

=== Anti-aircraft artillery ===
| Name | Type | Quantity | Origin | Image | Notes |
Self-propelled anti-aircraft artillery
| LD-3000 | Counter rocket, artillery, & mortar | Unknown | China | | Part of the HQ-11 air defense system |
| PLB-625 | 25 mm self-propelled anti-aircraft system | Unknown | China | | In Service. 25 mm wheeled CIWS with four FN-6 infrared surface-to-air missiles. |
| PGL-12 | 35 mm self-propelled anti-aircraft system | Unknown | China | | Limited number.Replaced by PGL-625. Single-barrel revolver 35 mm anti-air recon vehicle with four FN-6 infrared surface-to-air missiles. |
| PGZ-09 | 35 mm self-propelled anti-aircraft system | 120 | China | | In service. 2 X 35 mm and optionally 4 X fire-and-forget FN-6 missiles. |
| LD-2000 | Counter rocket, artillery, & mortar | Unknown | China | | Part of the HQ-6A air defense system |
| PGZ-95 / PGZ-04 | 25 mm self-propelled anti-aircraft system | 270 | China | | In service 4 X 25 mm and 4 X fire-and-forget QW-2 or FN-6 missiles. |
| PGZ-88 | 37 mm self-propelled anti-aircraft system | 6 | China | | In limited service for training. 2 X 37 mm self-propelled anti-aircraft system |
Surface-to-air missile
| HQ-11 | Short range surface-to-air missile | Unknown | China | | Medium to long range terminal air defense system |
| HQ-16A/B | Medium range surface-to-air missile | 250 | China | | Medium range air defense system |
| HQ-6D | Short range surface-to-air missile | 30 | China | | Low attitude, short-range surface-to-air missile system developed from the Italian Aspide missile. |
| FK-3000 | Short range surface-to-air missile | | China | | anti-drone swarm, short-range surface-to-air missile system with 96 interceptors |
| HQ-13 | Short range surface-to-air missile | | China | | Short range air defense system; three variants exist: ZBD-05 based amphibious air defense system, Dongfeng Mengshi chassis based gun-missile system, Dongfeng Mengshi chassis based missile launch vehicle |
| HQ-17/A | Short range surface-to-air missile | 250 | China | | Low to medium altitude, short-range surface-to-air missile system. |
| 9K331 Tor-M1 | Short range surface-to-air missile | 24 | Soviet Union | | Low to medium altitude, short-range surface-to-air missile system. |
| HQ-7A/B | Short range surface-to-air missile | 200 | China | | Low attitude, short-range surface-to-air missile system developed from the French Crotale missile. |
Direct-energy weapon
| Hurricane-3000 | Microwave weapon | | China | | High-power microwave weapon of 6 km (3.7 mi) range for drone air defense |
| OW5-A10 | Laser weapon | | China | | High-energy laser weapon of 10-kilowatt class |
| OW5-A50 | Laser weapon | | China | | High-energy laser weapon of 50-kilowatt class |
Towed anti-aircraft artillery
| PG-99 (Type 90) | 35 mm towed anti-aircraft gun | 7,000+ | China | | 2 x 35 mm towed autocannon based on Type 90 2 X 35 mm, licensed production of Swiss Oerlikon 35 mm twin cannon. Military designation PG-99. Capable of radar-based automatic engagement. |
| PG-87 | 25 mm towed anti-aircraft gun | 7,000+ | China | | 2 x 25 mm, improved version of the Type 85. Capable of radar-based automatic engagement. |
| PG-74 | 37 mm towed anti-aircraft gun | 7,000+ | China | | 2 x 37 mm towed autocannon; replaced PG-55/PG-65. phased out. |

=== Other ===
==== Export-oriented ====
- AH-1 – 155 mm towed howitzer. Export version of the PLL-01 howitzer at 52 caliber.
- AH-2 – 155 mm towed howitzer. Export version of the PLL-01 howitzer.
- AH-4 – 155 mm towed howitzer.
- FGT-203 – 203 mm towed howitzer. Experimental design based on PLL-01. This artillery system was developed by Norinco in cooperation with Space Research International of Belgium.
- PLZ-45 – 155 mm self-propelled tracked howitzer. Export version of the PLZ-05.
- SH-1 – 155 mm/52 caliber truck-mounted self-propelled howitzer. Similar in concept to French CAESAR self-propelled howitzer.
- SH-3 – 122 mm armored self-propelled howitzer. Export version of the PLZ-89.
- SH-5 – 105 mm truck-mounted self-propelled howitzer.
- SH-9 – 120 mm truck-mounted self-propelled howitzer.
- SH-15 – 155 mm truck-mounted self-propelled howitzer. Export version of the PCL-181.
- SH-16A – 155 mm self-propelled wheeled howitzer.
- W90 – 203 mm self-propelled howitzer gun. Export-oriented. In limited service.
- CS/SM10 – 120 mm all-terrain vehicle mounted self-propelled mortar-howitzer.
- CS/SH4 – 122 mm truck-mounted self-propelled howitzer.
- CS/SS6 – 81 mm all-terrain vehicle mounted self-propelled mortar.
- CS/SM4 – – 120 mm self-propelled mortar.
- CS/SM1 – 81 mm rapid fire self-propelled mortar. Export version of the PCP-001.
- SR-4 – 40-tube 122 mm multiple rocket launcher system, export version of the PHL-11.
- SR-5 – 40-tube 122 mm multiple rocket launcher system with modular rocket pod selections
- SR-7 – 20-tube 122 mm multiple rocket launcher system with modular rocket pod selections
- AR-1 – 12-tube 300 mmm multiple rocket launcher system
- AR-1A – 10-tube 300 mm modular multiple rocket launcher system, improved AR-1
- AR-2 – 10-tube 300 mm multiple rocket launcher system
- AR-3 – 8-tube 370 mm modular multiple rocket launcher system
- SY-400 – 8-tube 400 mm multiple rocket launcher system, first unveiled at the 2008 Zhuhai Airshow
- SY-300 – 8-tube 300 mm multiple rocket launcher system, first unveiled at the 2008 Zhuhai Airshow
- WM-40 – 273 mm multiple rocket launcher system
- WM-80 – 273 mm multiple rocket launcher system, improved WM-40
- A-300 – 10-tube 300 mm multiple rocket launcher system, improved A-200
- A-200 – 10-tube 300 mm multiple rocket launcher system, improved A-100
- A-100 – 10-tube 300 mm multiple rocket launcher system
- Weishi Rockets – multiple launch rocket system developed by Sichuan Academy of Aerospace Technology
- WS-1 and WS-1B – an 8 and 4 tube 320 mm multiple launch rocket system developed by Sichuan Academy of Aerospace Technology
- WS-2 – 6-tube 400 mm multiple launch rocket system
- WS-3 – 6-tube 406 mm multiple launch rocket system
- WS-6 – 40-tube 122 mm multiple launch rocket system
- WS-22 – 40-tube 122 mm multiple launch rocket system with guided rockets
- WS-32 – 10-tube 300 mm multiple launch rocket system with guided rockets
- WS-33 – 200 mm multiple launch rocket system
- WS-35 – 320 mm multiple launch rocket system, improved WS-1
- WS-43 – 200 mm multiple launch rocket system with loitering munitions
- WS-63 – 10-tube 300 mm multiple launch rocket system with radar-guided rockets
- WS-64 – anti-ship missile multiple launch rocket system
- WS-400 – anti-submarine missile multiple launch rocket system
- WS-600L – ballistic missile multiple launch rocket system
- CS/AA3
- CS/SA1 – 35 mm self-propelled anti-aircraft system. Export-oriented. Low-attitude system, capable of engaging cruise missiles and mortar rounds.
- CS/SA5 – Air defense vehicle with a 6-barrel 30 mm Gatling gun and FN-6 or FB-10A missiles. First seen at Zhuhai Airshow 2014
- Type 625E – Air defense vehicle with a 6-barrel 25 mm Gatling gun and FB-10 or FB-10A missiles.
- SA2 (LD76) – 76 mm self-peopelled air defense cannon with airburst munition.
- SW1
- SWS3 – 1 × 35 mm self-propelled anti-aircraft system mounted on the Dongfeng Mengshi chassis. Fitted with two FB-10A missiles.
- SWS2 (BK1060) – 1 × 35 mm self-propelled anti-aircraft system. Export variant of the PGL-12.
- Type 92 Yitian – Self-propelled anti-aircraft system based on the WZ-551. Wheeled mobile TY-90 SAM system.
- Type 85 Shengong – 2 × 23 mm truck-towed, computer-controlled air defense system

==== Reserve and retired ====
- Type 123 (WZ123)– common tracked artillery chassis. Used as the basis for artillery vehicles such as the PLZ-05 and PGZ-09.
- Type 321 (WZ321) – common tracked artillery chassis. Used as the basis for artillery vehicles such as the PLZ-45, PHZ-89, PTZ-89 and Type 83 SPH.
- Type 83 SPH – 152 mm self-propelled howitzer.
- Type 83 (PL-83) – 122 mm towed howitzer. Copy of the Soviet M-30 howitzer
- Type 86 (PL-66) – 122 mm towed howitzer. Copy of the Soviet D-30 howitzer
- Type 66 (PL-66) – 152 mm towed howitzer. Copy of the Soviet D-20 howitzer
- Type 60 (PL-60) – copy of the Soviet D-74 122 mm field gun
- Type 70 (Type WZ302) – 122 mm self-propelled howitzer. PL-54-1 howitzer mounted on the Type 63 APC.
- Type 54-1 (PL-54-1) – 122 mm towed howitzer. Copy of the Soviet M-30 howitzer
- Type 54 (PL-54) – 152 mm towed howitzer. Copy of the Soviet D-1 howitzer
- Type 59 and Type 59-1 (PL-59/PL-59-1) – copy of the Soviet M46 130 mm towed field gun
- Type 81 – (PHL-81) 40-tube 122 mm rocket artillery. Phasing out.
- Type 90 (PHL-90) – 40122 mm rocket artillery with an integrated reload pod, improved PHL-81. Retired.
- Type 90 – 30-tube 130 mm rocket artillery based on the Type 90 AFV chassis.
- Type 83 – 273 mm multiple rocket launcher in limited service. Retired.
- Type 82 – 30-tube 130 mm multiple rocket launcher based on Yanan SX250 6×6 truck; replacing the earlier 19-tube 130 mm Type 70 multiple rocket launcher mounted on the Type 63 APC.
- Type 762 (GSL3 or GSL111) – 425 mm multiple rocket minesweeper, Type 321 common chassis.
- Type 74 – 284 mm multiple rocket minelayer, Chinese derivative of the Soviet BM-13 Katyusha.
- Type 70 (Type WZ303) – 19-tube 130 mm multiple rocket launcher mounted on the Type 63 APC (YW531) chassis.
- Type 65 – 7-tube 250 mm multiple rocket system, Chinese copy of the RBU-1200 anti-submarine rocket system.
- Type 63 – 19-tube 130 mm multiple rocket launcher – Chinese copy of the BM-14-17, but with more tubes.
- Type 63 – (PH-63) 12-tube 107 mm towed multiple rocket launcher
- Type 87 (PG-87) – dual 25 mm, improved Type 85 with the caliber increased.
- Type 85 (WZ554) – dual 23 mm, self-propelled anti-aircraft vehicle with Type 85 mounted on the Type 90 (WZ-551) chassis
- Type 85 (YW306) – dual 23 mm, Chinese copy of the Soviet ZU-23-2, replaced by the Type 87.
- Type 80 (WZ305) – dual 57 mm self-propelled anti-aircraft vehicle. Prototype is built on the Type 321 tracked chassis, while the production version is based on the Type 69-II tank chassis. Design based on the ZSU-57-2.
- Type 72 – 85 mm, reported to be the Chinese copy of Soviet M1939 (52-K)
- Type 71 – 20 mm, towed autocannon.
- Type 65 – dual 37 mm, twin barrel copy of the Soviet M1939 (61-K). Improved Type 55.
- Type 63/Type 65– dual 23 mm anti-aircraft vehicle, mounted on the T-34-76 and T-34-85
- Type 59 – 100 mm, copy of the Soviet KS-19 gun.
- Type 59 – 57 mm, single barrel, copy of the Soviet AZP (S-60).
- Type 55 – 37 mm, single barrel copy of the Soviet M1939 (61-K).
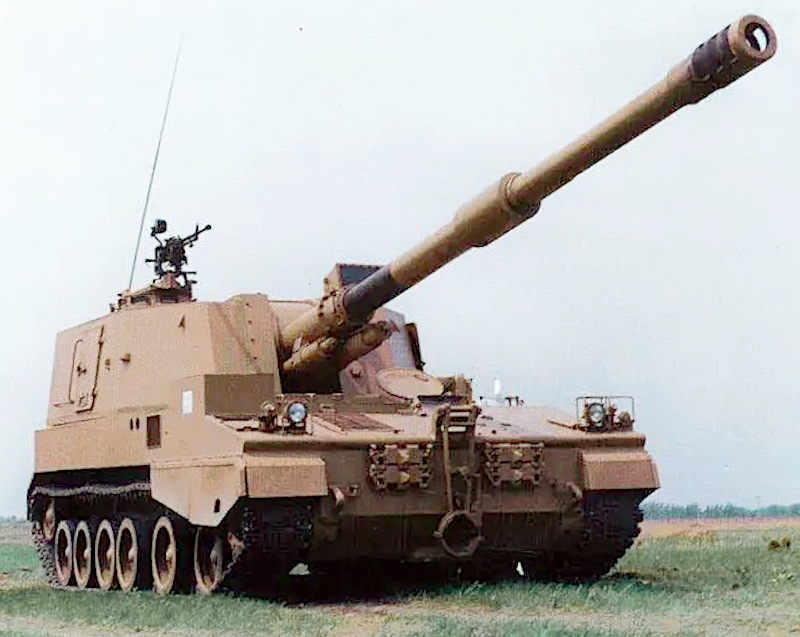
PLZ-45 155 mm self-propelled tracked howitzer

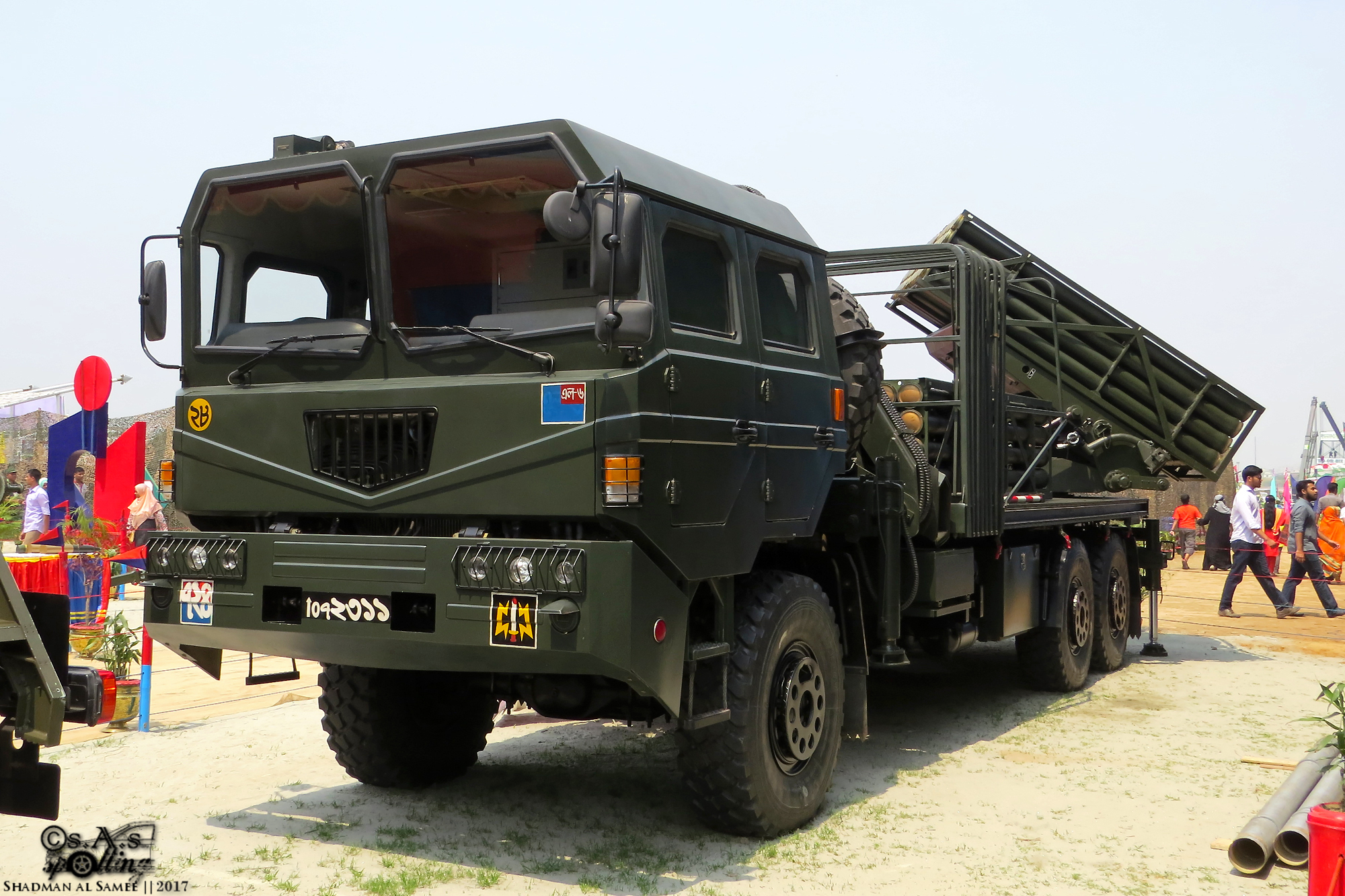
Weishi WS-22 multiple rocket launcher of the Bangladesh Army

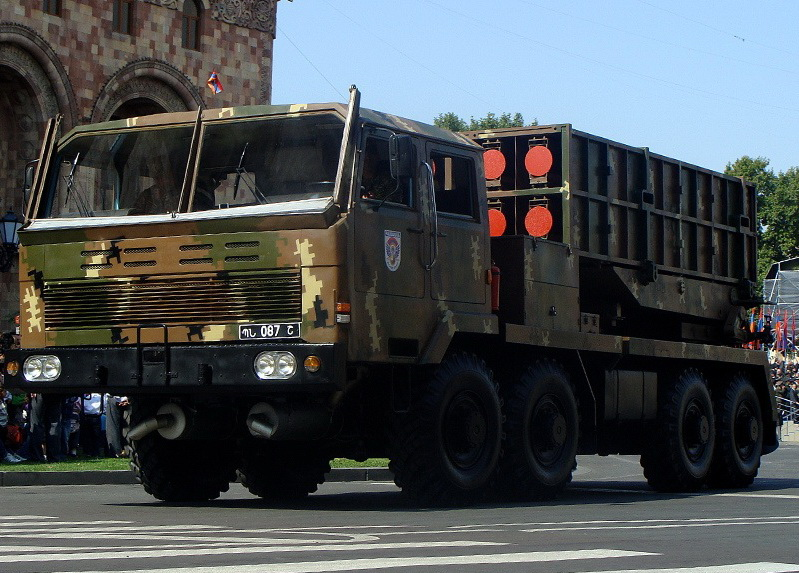
WM-80 Multiple Rocket Launcher System at Independence Day Parade in Yerevan, Armenia

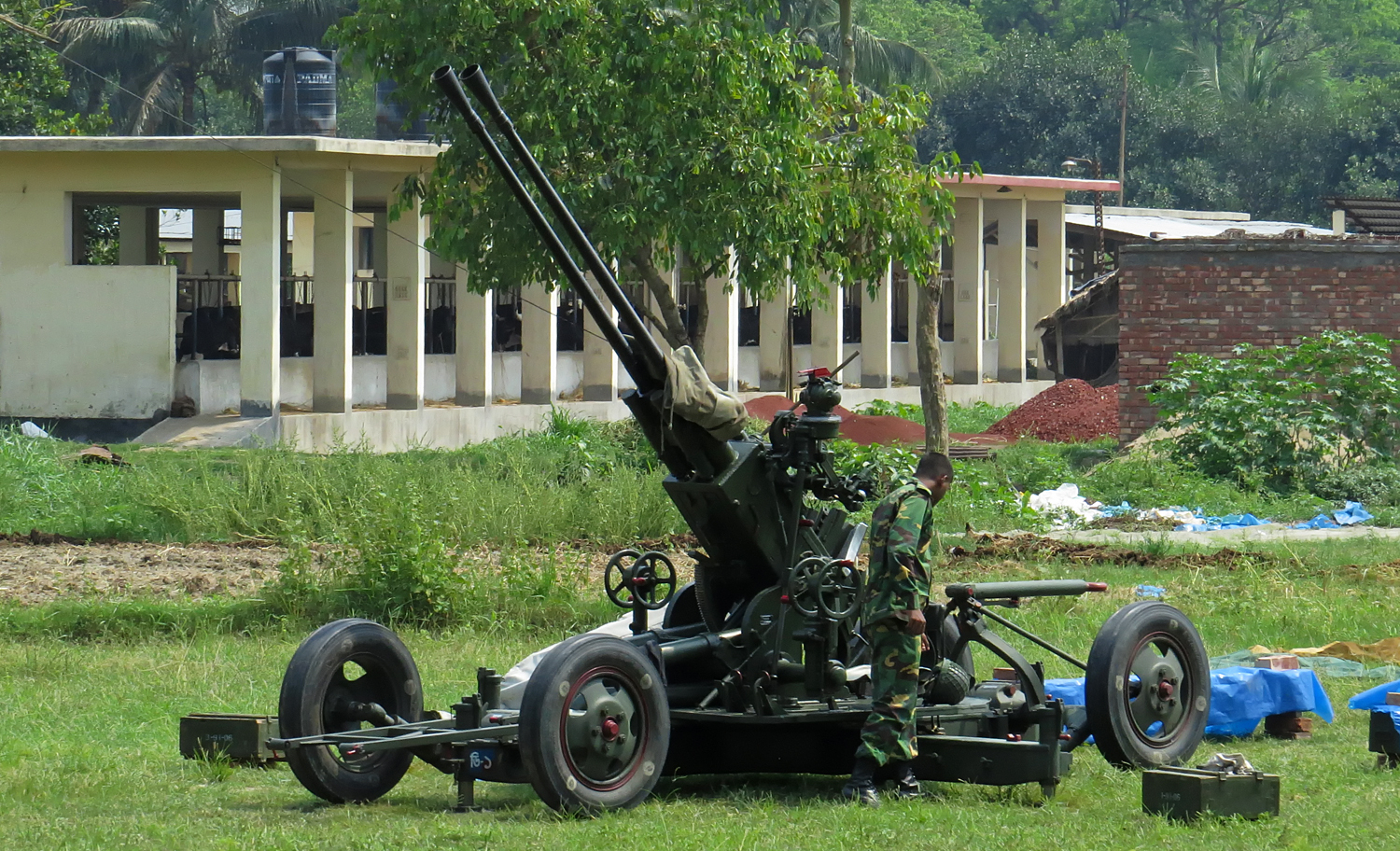
Type 74 anti-aircraft autocannon

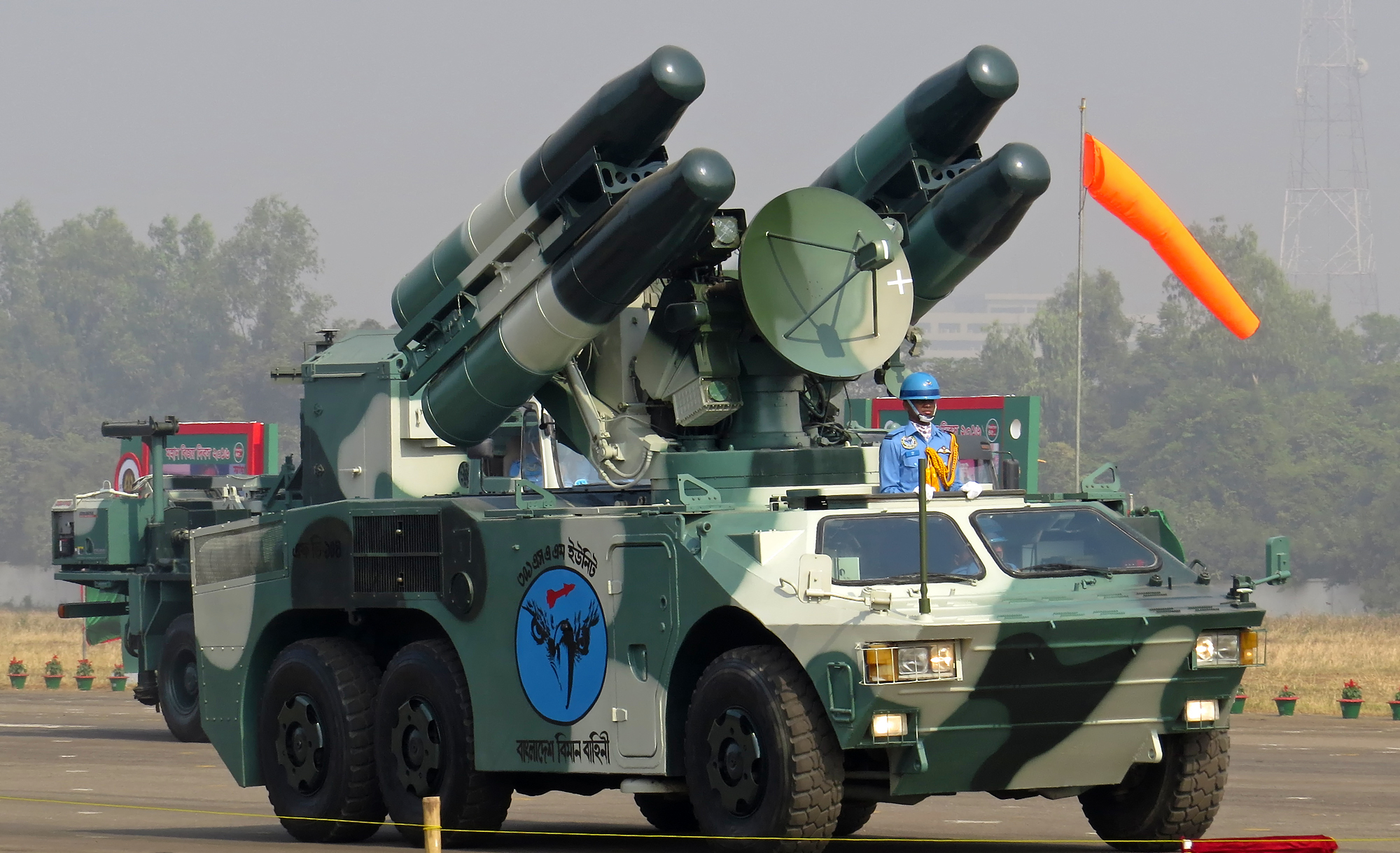
FM-90 air defense system sold to Bangladesh Air Force

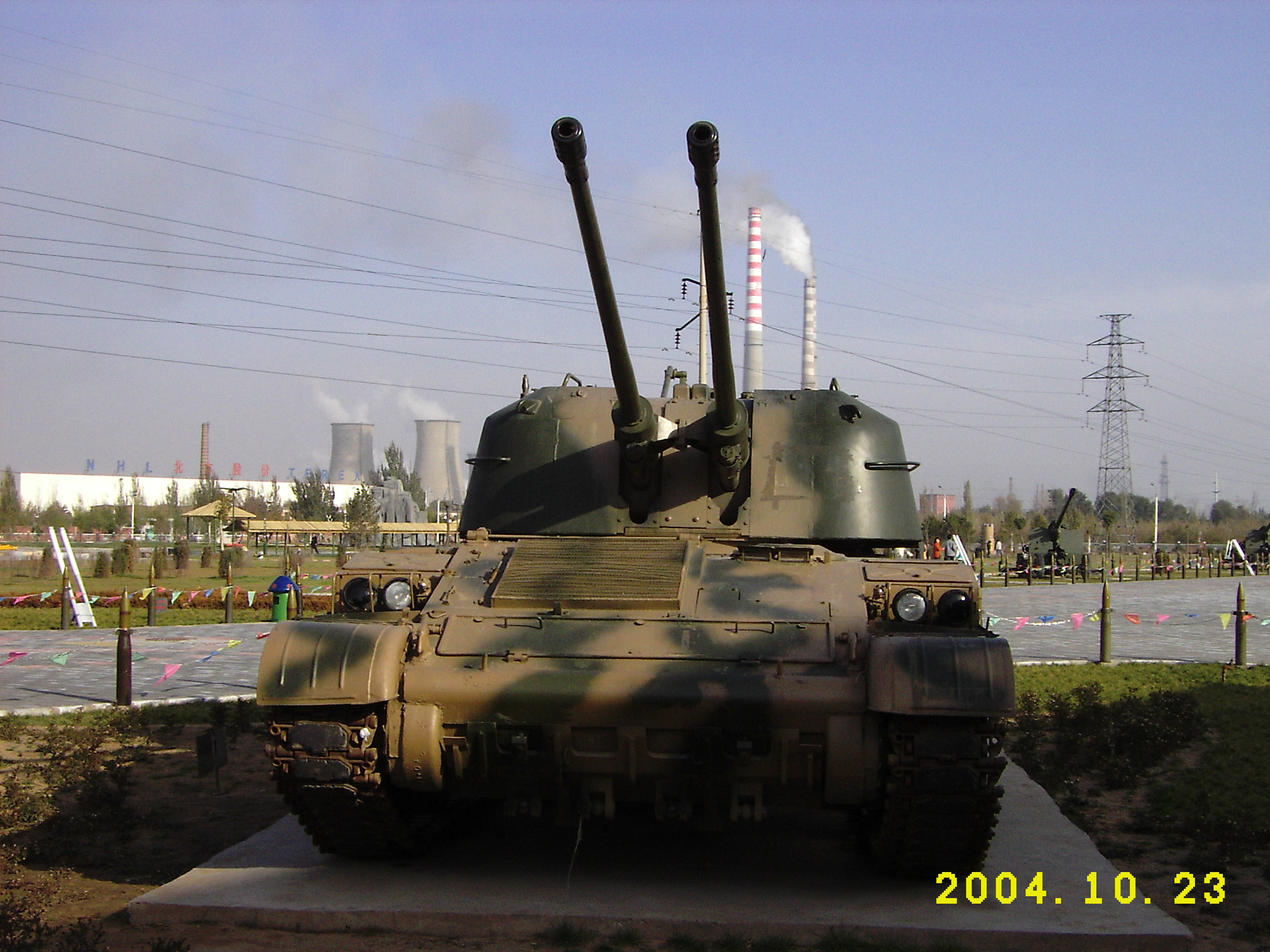
Experimental WZ-305 prototype based on the Type 321 tracked chassis

== Vehicle ==
=== Armored combat vehicles ===
| Name | Type | Quantity | Origin | Image | Notes |
Medium and main battle tanks
| Type 100 | Main battle tank | Unknown | China | | |
| Type 99 | Main battle tank | 1,400+ | China | | Type 99: 600+ Type 99A: 700+ Type 99B: 100+ |
| Type 96 | Main battle tank | 2,600 | China | | Type 96: 1,000; Type 96A: 1,500 |
| Type 88 | Main battle tank | 500 | China | | Variants: Type 88A/88B |
Light tanks
| Type 15 tank | Light tank | 1,000 | China | | |
Fire support vehicles
| Type 100 | Fire support vehicle | Unknown | China | | |
Infantry fighting vehicle
| ZBL-19 | Infantry fighting vehicle | Unknown | China | | The ZBL-19 is a modern Chinese eight-wheeled infantry fighting vehicle (IFV), succeeding earlier models like the ZBL-08 and ZBL-09 series. |
| ZBL-08 | Infantry fighting vehicle | 3,250 | China | | |
| ZBD-05 | Amphibious infantry fighting vehicle | 1,500 | China | | Equipped with the PLA Ground Force amphibious assault brigade |
| ZBD-04A | Infantry fighting vehicle | 2,600 | China | | |
| ZBD-04 | Infantry fighting vehicle | 400 | China | | |
| ZSL-92B | Infantry fighting vehicle | 600 | China | | WZ-551 with 30 mm autocannon |
| ZSL-92 | Infantry fighting vehicle | 550 | China | | WZ-551 with 25 mm autocannon |
| ZBD-86A | Infantry fighting vehicle | 1,750 | China | | Improved Type 86 with a 30 mm autocannon |
| ZBD-86 | Infantry fighting vehicle | 1,250 | China | | Chinese infantry fighting vehicle based on the BMP-1 |
Armoured personnel carriers
| ZSL-10 | Armored personnel carrier | 5,950+ | China | | |
| ZSD-05 | Amphibious Armored personnel carrier | Unknown number | China | | Equipped with the PLA Ground Force amphibious assault brigade |
| ZSL-92A | Armored personnel carrier | 700 | China | | |
| ZSL-93 | Armored personnel carrier | 50 | China | | PLA designation for WZ-523 |
| ZSD-89/ZSD-89A | Armored personnel carrier | 1,750 | China | | |
Mine-resistant ambush protected vehicles
| MV3 Armored Cabin | Mine-resistant ambush-protected vehicle | | China | | Armored patrol vehicle with reinforced armor. |
| MV3 MRAP Mod. | Mine-resistant ambush-protected vehicle | | China | | MRAP border patrol vehicle with reinforced armor and protection against improvised explosive devices (IED). |
| VP22 | Mine resistant ambush protected vehicle | | China | | Limited testing by People's Liberation Army Ground Force infantry in an off-road terrain environment. |
| CSK-181 | Mine-resistant ambush-protected vehicle | | China | | |
Infantry mobility vehicles
| CSK-141 | Armored assault vehicle | Unknown | China | | 4×4 Light Protective Assault Vehicle |
| CSK-131 | Armored assault vehicle | Unknown | China | | 4×4 Light Tactical Vehicle |
| Dongfeng EQ2050 | Infantry mobility vehicle | | China | | |
| Lynx | All-terrain vehicle | | China | | |

=== Anti-tank/anti-structure vehicles ===
| Name | Type | Quantity | Origin | Image | Notes |
Assault guns
| Type 19 | 105 mm assault gun | Unknown | China | | Assault/Anti-Tank gun variant based on ZBL-19 chassis. |
| ZTL-11 | 105 mm assault gun | | China | | Assault gun variant based on ZBL-08 chassis. |
| ZTD-05 | amphibious 105 mm assault gun | 750 | China | | Equipped with the PLA Ground Force amphibious assault brigade |
| PTL-02 | 100 mm assault gun | 250 | China | | Assault gun variant based on WZ-551 infantry fighting vehicle chassis. |
Tank destroyers and missile carriers
| CM-501XA | Loitering munition | | China | | 10 km-40 km point strike loitering munition (suicide drone) |
| CM-501GA | Anti-tank guided missile Anti-ship missile | | China | | 10 km-40 km point strike cruise missile |
| CTL-181A Drone Swarm | Loitering munition | | China | | Multiple launching loitering munition & drone swarm (suicide drone) |
| AFT-11 Carrier | Anti-tank missile carrier | | China | | In service. HJ-11 missile deployed on Dongfeng Mengshi ground vehicle platform. |
| AFT-10 Carrier | Anti-tank missile carrier | | China | | In service. HJ-10 missile deployed on ZBD-04A, ZBD-05, ZBL-08, FAW MV3 ground vehicle platforms. |
| AFT-9 Carrier | Anti-tank missile carrier | | China | | In service. HJ-9 missile deployed on WZ-551 ground vehicle platform. |
| AFT-8C/D/E Carrier | Anti-tank missile carrier | | China | | In service. AFT-8C, D, and E variants can be mounted on BJ2022 and other light assault vehicles. |
| HJ-73D Carrier | Anti-tank missile carrier | | China | | In service. HJ-73D can be mounted on various platforms of PLAGF. |

=== Logistic and support vehicles ===
| Name | Type | Quantity | Origin | Image | Notes |
Logistic and utility trucks
| Shaanxi SX2220 (HMV3) | Heavy tactical truck | | China | | 7 tonnes (7,000 kg) (off-road) payload. Third generation heavy utility truck of 6x6 chassis. |
| Shaanxi SX2306 (HMV3) | Heavy tactical truck | | China | | 10 tonnes (10,000 kg) (off-road) payload. Third generation heavy utility truck of 8x8 chassis. |
| FAW MV3 | Tactical truck | | China | | 3.5–5 tonnes (3,500–5,000 kg) (off-road) payload. In service since 2011. Third generation tactical truck platform developed by FAW for PLA. |
| Taian TA5450 | Heavy transporter | | China | | 25 tonnes (25,000 kg) payload. Heavy equipment transporter of 8x8 chassis used for mounting missiles, radar, and other equipment. |
| Taian TA4410 | Heavy transporter | | China | | 65 tonnes (65,000 kg) payload. Third generation heavy tank transporter of 8x8 chassis capable of transporting Type 99 tank. |
| Taian TA4360 | Heavy transporter | | China | | 60 tonnes (60,000 kg) payload. Third generation heavy tank transporter of 6x6 chassis capable of transporting Type 99 tank. |
| Shaanxi SX2190 | Tactical logistic truck | | Austria; China | | 5-tonne truck of PLAGF in 1980s. Chinese licensed version of Steyr 91 from Austria. |
| Dongfeng EQ2102 | Logistic truck | | China | | In service since mid-1990s. Chinese militarized version of Nissan Diesel Condor. 3.5-tonne capacity troop/cargo carrier truck. Replaced EQ245/EQ2100. |
| Type 82 truck (HY472) | Heavy transporter | | China | | 60 tonnes (60,000 kg) payload. Second generation heavy tank transporter of 6x6 chassis capable of transporting Type 96 tank. |
| Jonyang JY813 | Articulated all-terrain tracked vehicle | | China | | |
Light utility vehicles
| BJ2022 | Light utility vehicle | | United States; People's Republic of China | | Widely used 4x4 vehicle in the Chinese army. Jointly developed by Beijing Auto Works and Chrysler from America. |
| BJ2020 | Light utility vehicle | | China | | |
| BJ80 | Light utility vehicle | | China | | |
| NJ2045/2046 | Light utility vehicle | | Italy; People's Republic of China | | Chinese licensed version of Iveco VM 90 from Italy. |
Military engineering
| Type 90-II ARV | Armored recovery vehicle | | China | | Service support for Type 96 tank and Type 99 tank. Based on Type 99 tank chassis. |
| VME-102-40 | Armored recovery vehicle | | China | | Service support for Type 96 tank and Type 99 tank. Based on Type 96 tank chassis. |
| VME-203 ARV | Armored recovery vehicle | | China | | Based on Type 08 8x8 IFV chassis. |
| Type 05 ARV | Amphibious armored recovery vehicle | | China | | Based on ZBD-05 chassis. |
| ZBD-04A ARV | Armored recovery vehicle | | China | | Based on ZBD-04A chassis. |
| ZJX-93 (Type 93) | Armored recovery vehicle | | China | | Type 93 is based on Type 89 AFV chassis. |
| Type 84 (WZ653A) | Armored recovery vehicle | | China | | Type 84 is the second generation recovery vehicle supporting service for Type 79 tank, Type 88 tank, and Type 96 tank. Chassis is based on Type 79 tank. |
| WZ653 ARV | Armored recovery vehicle | | China | | Based on Type 69 tank. |
| Type 76 ARV | Amphibious armored recovery vehicle | | China | | Based on Type 63 amphibious light tank. |
| Type 73 ARV | Armored recovery vehicle | | China | | Based on Type 59 tank. |
| GZM-003 | Amphibious bridging vehicle | | China | | |
| Type 08/VN1 assault bridge | Armored bridging vehicle | | China | | Based on Type 08 8x8 IFV. |
| GQL-410 heavy assault bridge vehicle | Armored vehicle | | China | | Based on Type 96 tank chassis. Support Type 99 tank and other heavy vehicles. |
| Type 84 (WZ621) bridging tank | Armored bridging vehicle | | China | | In service since 1985. Based on Type 79 tank chassis. Support 40-tonne payload. |
| GQL-111 heavy mechanized bridge | Vehicle-launched bridge | | China | | |
| CTL-181A Assault Bridge Builder | Vehicle-launched bridge | | China | | Truck mounted vehicle-launched bridge. |
| GQL-321 light mechanized bridge | Vehicle-launched bridge Pontoon bridge | | China | | In service as of 1996. The chassis is based on XC2200. |
| GQL-110 heavy mechanized bridge (Type 84) | Vehicle-launched bridge | | China | | Also known as Type 84. Further development of GQL-120A. The chassis is based on JN252. |
| GQL-120A light mechanized bridge (Type 69A) | Vehicle-launched bridge | | China | | Also known as Type 69A. Based on Dongfeng EQ2081 chassis. The bridge system is improved from earlier Type 69 mechanized bridge developed in 1969. |
| GAZ-004 | Armored engineering vehicle | | China | | Based on the Type 08 chassis. |
| GCZ-112 | Armored engineering vehicle | | China | | Based on Type 96 tank chassis. |
| GCZ-110 | Armored engineering vehicle | | China | | Based on Type 96 tank chassis. |
| GSL-411 (GSL-241) | Obstacle breaching vehicle | | China | | Heavy obstacle breaching rocket launcher designed for amphibious assault mission. |
| GSL-430 (GBP-128) | Obstacle breaching vehicle | | China | | Based on BJ 2032 chassis. |
| GBP-126 | Obstacle breaching vehicle | | China | | |
| GSL-133 | Minefield breaching vehicle | | China | | Based on Type 96 tank chassis. Fitted with mine-clearing line charge. |
| GSL-134 breaching vehicle | Minefield breaching vehicle | | China | | Based on Type 08 8x8 IFV. Fitted with mine-clearing line charge. |
| GSL-132 breaching vehicle | Minefield breaching vehicle | | China | | Based on ZBD-05 chassis. Fitted with the GBP-127 type mine-clearing line charge. |
| GSL-130 | Minefield breaching vehicle | | China | | In service as of 1996. Improved from GSL-131 and based on Type 79 tank chassis. It's fitted with rocket assist mine-clearing line charge. |
| GSL-131 | Minefield breaching vehicle | | China | | Based on Type 84 military tractor chassis, which itself was based on Type 62 light tank. It's fitted with rocket assist mine-clearing line charge. |
| GSL-211 | Minefield breaching vehicle | | China | | Mine clearing vehicle based on Type 83 SPH chassis. It's fitted with rocket assist mine-clearing line charge. The vehicle is developed in 1960s. |
| GSL-111 (WZ762A) | Minefield breaching vehicle | | China | | First generation mine clearing vehicle. It's fitted with rocket assist mine-clearing line charge. The vehicle is developed in 1960s. |
| GSL-110B | Airburst rocket mine clearing vehicle | | China | | First generation mine clearing vehicle based on Type 62 light tank chassis. |
| GSL-110/A (Type 81) | Airburst rocket mine clearing vehicle | | China | | First generation mine clearing vehicle. This vehicle saw combat operation during Sino–Vietnamese conflicts (1979–1991). |
| Type 90A MLV | Wheeled minelayer | | China | | Based on Type 90A MLRS. |
| GBL-130 | Tracked minelayer | | China | | Based on Type 89 AFV |
| GBL-120 | Tracked minelayer | | China | | |
| Type 84 MLV | Wheeled minelayer | | China | | Early rocket-assist mine-laying vehicle based on BM-21 Grad chassis. |
| Type 74 | Wheeled minelayer | | China | | In service as of 1975. Phased out. Early rocket-assist mine-laying vehicle based on FAW CA-30 general utility truck chassis. |
| GJW-320 | Combat excavator | | China | | In service as of 1987. Tracked excavator designed for digging trenches. |
| GDG-130 | Backhoe loader | | China | | In service as of 2014. Excavator designed to support heavy forces. |
Special vehicle
| CSZ-181 MEDVAC | Armored ambulance | | China | | Based on the CSZ-181 armored assault box truck. |
| ZFB-05C MEDVAC | Armored ambulance | | China | | Based on the ZFB-05 armored vehicle, modified to a box truck. |
| Type 08 Armored Ambulance | Armored ambulance | | China | | Based on the Type 08 command vehicle. Featuring a modified crew cabin with medical equipment, the Armored Ambulance variant has two Red Cross markers on each side of the vehicle body. |
| Type 89A Armored Ambulance | Armored ambulance | | China | | Based on the ZSD-89A armored fighting vehicle. |
| Type 14 Hazardous Environment Reconnaissance Vehicle | Battlefield hazard detection and surveillance | | China | | Based on the Type 08 command vehicle. Equipped with sensors and equipment for hazardous detection involving nuclear, biological, and chemical environments. |
| CSK-131 C2 | Armored command vehicle | | China | | Command vehicle based on CSK-131 chassis |
| CSK-181 C2 | Armored command vehicle | | China | | Command vehicle based on CSK-181 chassis |
| Type 89 C2 | Armored command vehicle | | China | | Command vehicle based on tracked ZSD-89 chassis |
| ZSD-89A C2 | Armored command vehicle | | China | | Command vehicle based on tracked ZSD-89A chassis |
| ZBD-03 C2 | Armored command vehicle | | China | | Command vehicle based on tracked ZBD-03 chassis |
| Type 05 C2 | Armored command vehicle | | China | | Command vehicle based on tracked ZBD-05 chassis |
| Type 08 C2 | Armored command vehicle | | China | | Command vehicle based on wheeled Type 08 chassis |
| CSK-131 Recce | Armored reconnaissance vehicle | | China | | Command vehicle based on CSK-131 chassis |
| CSK-181 Recce | Armored reconnaissance vehicle | | China | | Command vehicle based on CSK-181 chassis |
| ZZC-01 Recce | Armored reconnaissance vehicle | | China | | Frontline reconnaissance vehicle based on tracked ZSD-89 chassis |
| ZZC-02 Recce | Armored reconnaissance vehicle | | China | | Radar reconnaissance vehicle based on tracked ZSD-89 chassis |
| ZZC-06 Reccce | Armored reconnaissance vehicle | | China | | Frontline reconnaissance vehicle based on tracked ZSD-89A chassis |
| Type 05 Recce | Armored reconnaissance vehicle | | China | | Frontline reconnaissance vehicle based on tracked ZBD-05 chassis |
| ZZC-07 Recce | Armored reconnaissance vehicle | | China | | Frontline reconnaissance vehicle based on wheeled Type 08 chassis |
| Type 08 Electronic Warfare Vehicle | Electronic warfare | | China | | Based on the Type 08 communication vehicle but the satellite communication suite on top of the vehicle roof is replaced by a rectangular shaped radar with several small radar panels for Electronic Support Measures. |
| CTL-181A Electronic Warfare Vehicle | Electronic warfare | | China | | Based on the Dongfeng Mengshi chassis. |
Unmanned ground vehicle
| ZRY-222 | Combat and reconnaissance vehicle | | China | | Tracked unmanned vehicle armed with a heavy machine gun and missiles. |
| CWB-221 | Squad support vehicle | | China | | 6X6 unmanned transport vehicle for squad logistics |
| ZRZ-100 | Engineering vehicle | | China | | 6X6 unmanned engineering vehicle for path and mine-clearing |
| Robot wolf | Quadrupedal robot | | China | | Robotic platform for recon and assault. |

=== Other ===
==== Export-oriented ====
- VN1 – 8×8 infantry fighting vehicle, export version of the Type 08
- VN2 – 6×6 armmored personnel carrier, export version of the WZ-551
- VN3 – 4×4 armored car
- VN4 – 4×4 armored car, improved from the VN3
- VN11 – Export-oriented tracked infantry fighting vehicle
- VN12 – Export-oriented tracked infantry fighting vehicle
- VN16 – tracked amphibious vehicle
- VN18 – tracked amphibious vehicle
- VN22 – 6×6 infantry fighting vehicle
- VN23 – 8×8 armmored personnel carrier
- VP11 – mine-protected patrol vehicles
- VP22 – mine-protected patrol vehicles
- CS/AA5
- CS/VN3 – 4×4 armored car, unrelated to the VN3 project
- CS/VN4 – 6×6 armored personal carrier
- CS/VN9 – Export designation for the WZ-551.
- CS/VP3 – Export-oriented mine resistant, ambush protected vehicle (MRAP) developed by Poly Technologies.
- 8M – Export-oriented mine resistant, ambush protected vehicle (MRAP) jointly developed by Norinco and South African firm EWI2 for China, first revealed in mid-2012.
- CS/VP4 – 8x8 all terrain vehicle
- CS/VP11 – 4×4 all terrain vehicle
- CS/VP15 – 4×4 quadbike
- CS/VP16 – 6×6 all terrain vehicle
- Type 81 – Export variant of Type 63 armored personnel carrier
- Type 85 – Export-oriented armored personnel carrier developed alongside the Type 89 armored fighting vehicle. Limited services within PLAGF.
- Type 90 – Export-oriented armored personnel carrier based on Type 85. Limited services within PLAGF.
- ZFB-91 – 6x4 light-weight armored personnel carrier and internal security vehicle, limited service in PLAGF and Chinese People's Armed Police.
- ZFB-05 – 6x4 light-weight armored personnel carrier and internal security vehicle.

==== Reserve and retired ====
- Type 59 – Cold War main battle tank, with variants of Type 59/59II/59D. The Type 59 and Type 59D were fully retired in 2026.
- Type 62 – Cold War light tank based on the Type 59.
- Type 63 – Cold War amphibious light tank based on the PT-76.
- ZTS-63A – Amphibious light tank used in 1990s to 2010s.
- Type 63 – tracked armored personnel carrier. Retired in 2018.
- ZSD-89-II – IFV based on Type 89 APC, used in 1990s to 2010s.
- PTZ-89 – 120 mm tank destroyer; 230 built. In storage and no longer in active service.
- Type 77 – Amphibious armored personnel carrier used in 1980s.
- Dongfeng EQ245/EQ2100 – 3.5 tonne capacity, six-wheel drive troop/cargo carrier truck
- Ural-4320 – Soviet 5-tonne truck. Predecessor to EQ240.
- Dongfeng EQ240/EQ2081 – 2.5-tonne capacity, six-wheel drive troop/cargo carrier truck
- Shaanxi SX2110 – Standard tactical truck of PLAGF since 1980s.
- Shaanxi SX2300 – Standard tactical truck of PLAGF since 1980s.
- FAW CA-141 – Retired. General Utility Truck. Standard tactical truck of PLAGF since the 1980s.
- Taian TA4360 – Tank transporter of PLAGF in 1980s.
- Taian TA5380 – Heavy artillery truck.
- Wanshan WS580 – Heavy artillery truck. Chinese licensed copy of Belarus MAZ-537.
- Wanshan WS2300 – Heavy artillery truck.
- Wanshan WS2400 – Heavy artillery truck. Chinese licensed copy of Belarus MAZ-543
- Wanshan WS2600 – Heavy artillery truck.
- Kamaz-4326 – In limited service. General Utility Truck. Standard tactical truck of PLAGF since the 1990s.
- Kamaz-43114/43118 – In limited service. Heavy high mobility and tactical truck.
- KrAZ-6322 – In limited service. Heavy high mobility and tactical truck
- BJ212 – In limited service. Originally developed from UAZ-460. Standard light utility & off-road vehicle in the 1960s to 2000s.
- Dongfeng EQ1108 – Retired. General Utility Truck
- ZIL-4331 – Retired. General Utility Truck
- Yuejin NJ-130 – Retired. General Utility Truck, license-built GAZ-51
- Yuejin NJ-230 – Retired. General Utility Truck, license-built GAZ-63
- GAZ-53 – Retired. General Utility Truck
- FAW CA-6440 – Retired. Light utility van. Reverse engineered from Nissan Caravan E24.
- GAZ-66 – Retired. General Utility Truck
- FAW CA-10 – Retired. General Utility Truck, license-built ZIS-150, China's first domestically built truck type. Standard tactical truck of PLAGF in the 1950s to 1980s.
- FAW CA-30 – Retired. General Utility Truck, license-built ZIL-157
- ZIL-130 – Retired. General Utility Truck. Standard tactical truck of PLAGF in the 1960s to 1990s.
- ZIL-131 – Retired. General Utility Truck
- Kamaz-5320 – Retired. General Utility Truck
- Kamaz-53212/53215 – Retired. Heavy high mobility and tactical truck
- KrAZ-214 – Retired. Heavy high mobility and tactical truck
- KrAZ-255 – Retired. Heavy high mobility and tactical truck
- GAZ-69 – Retired. Standard light utility & off-road vehicle in the 1950s to 1990s.
- GAZ-69A – Retired. Standard light utility & off-road vehicle in the 1950s to 1990s.
- UAZ-452 – In limited service. Light utility & off-road van in reserve
- UAZ-469 – In limited service. Standard light utility & off-road vehicle in the 1970s to 2000s.
- GAC Changfeng Leopard – Chinese licensed version of the Mitsubishi Pajero. Standard light utility & off-road vehicle since the 1990s.
- Toyota Land Cruiser – In limited service. Light utility vehicle.
- Tiger 4×4 – locally produced Tigr armored utility vehicle.
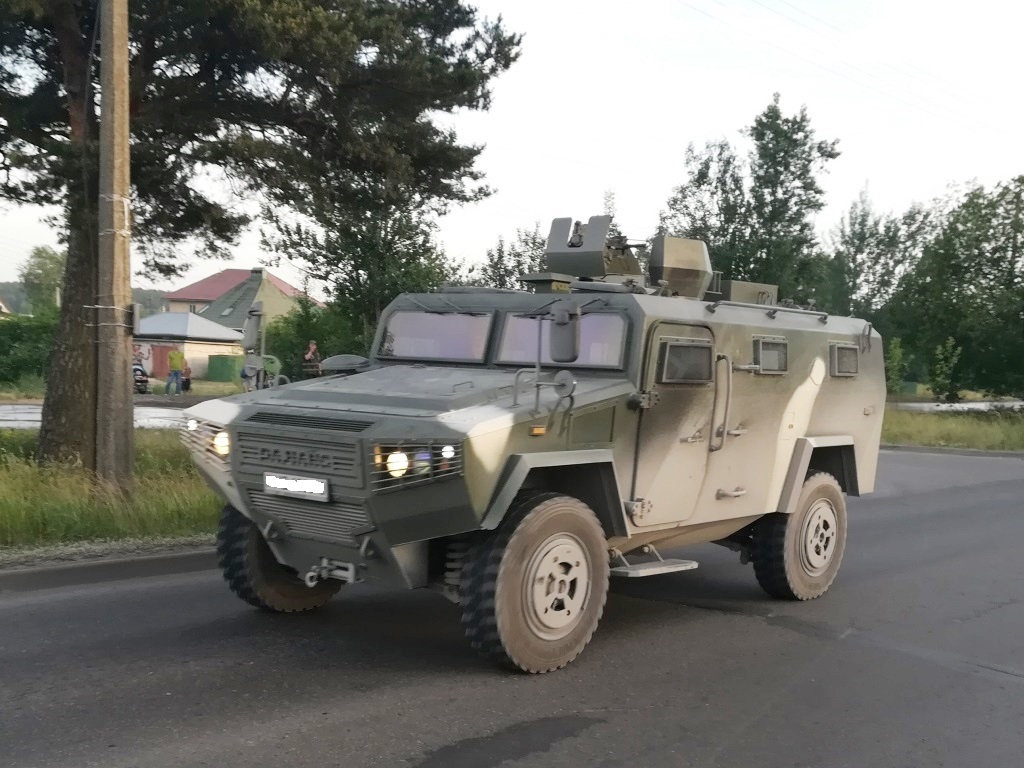
CS/VN3 armored car

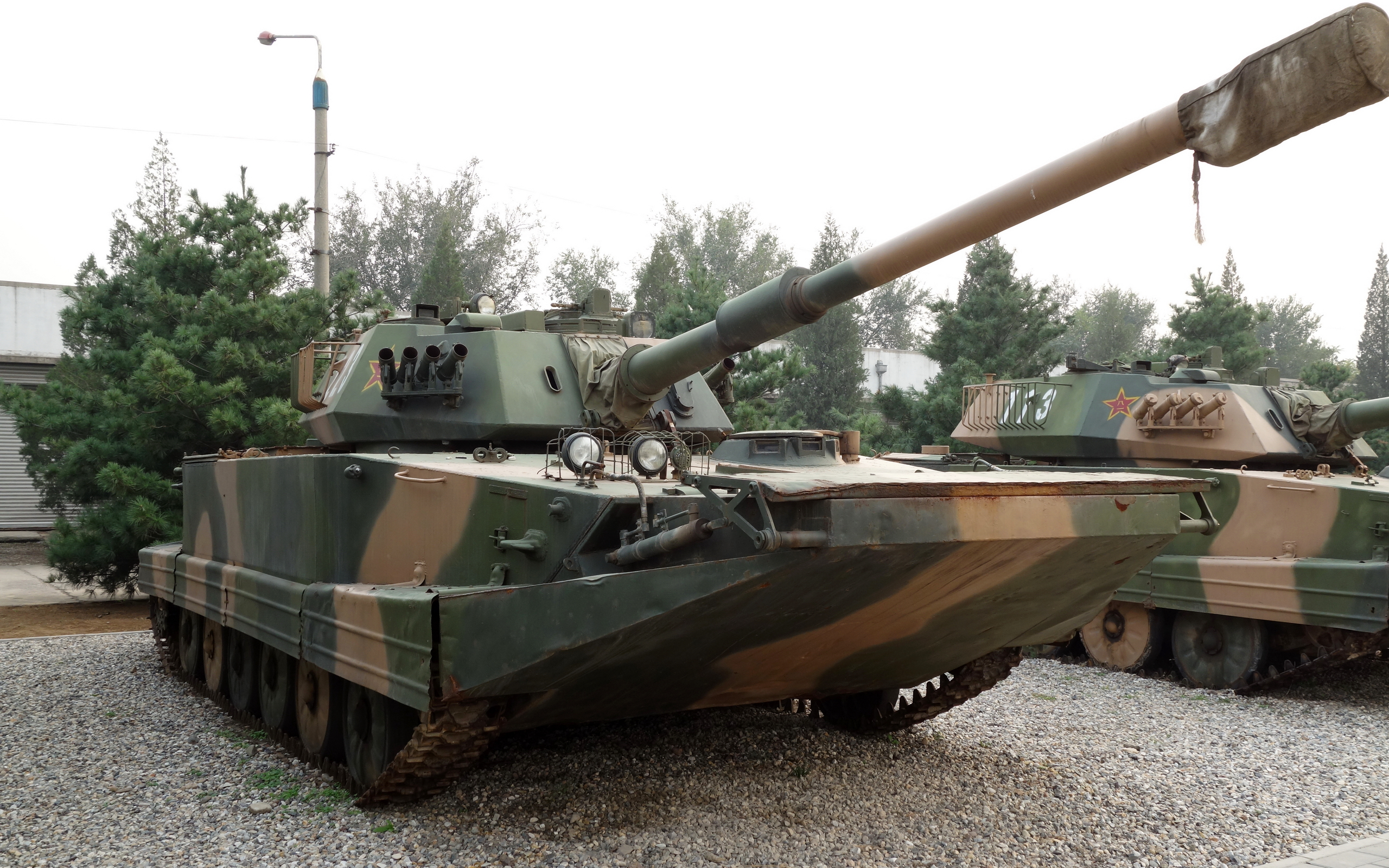
Type 63A amphibious light tank

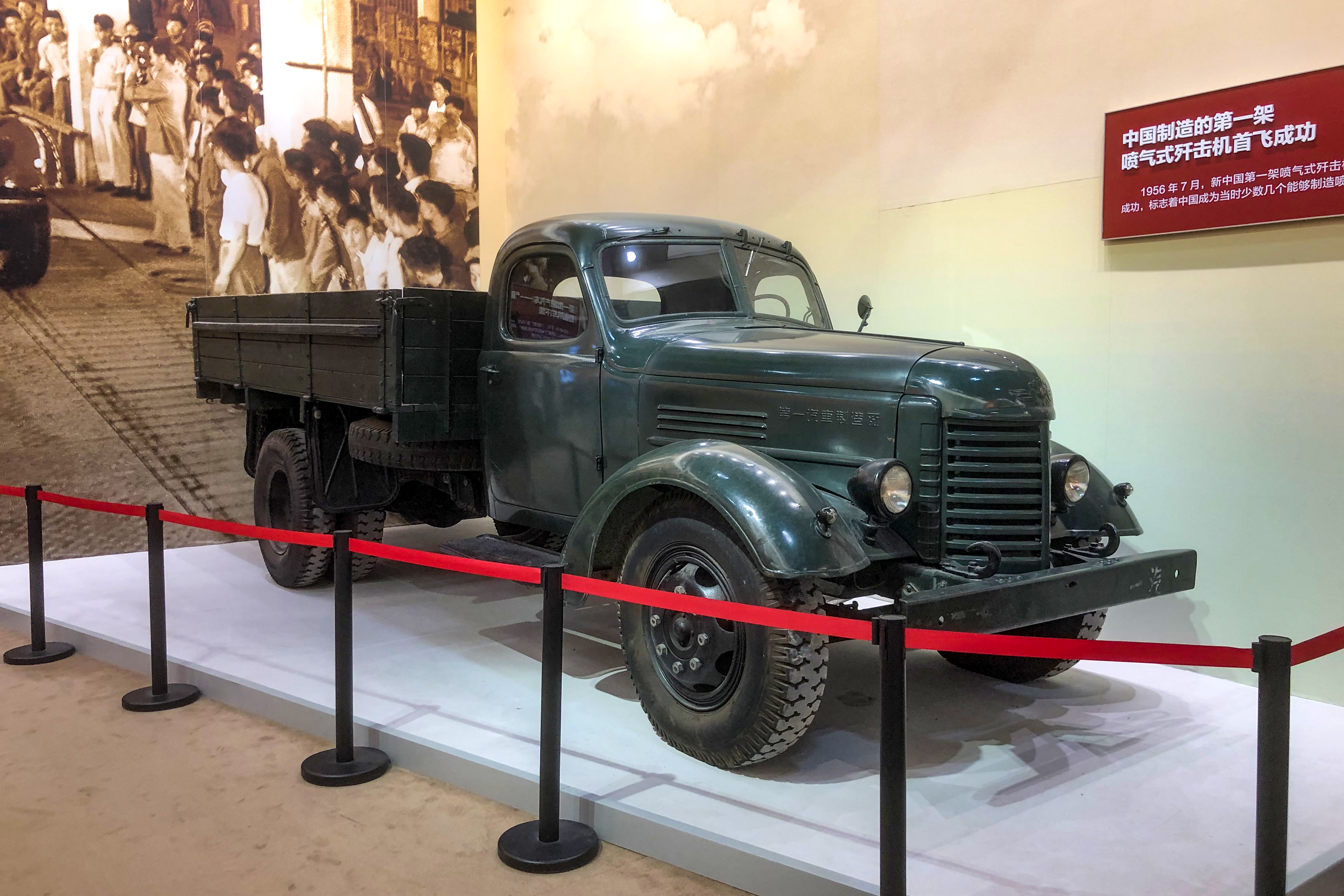
FAW CA-10 at China's 70th Anniversary Exhibition

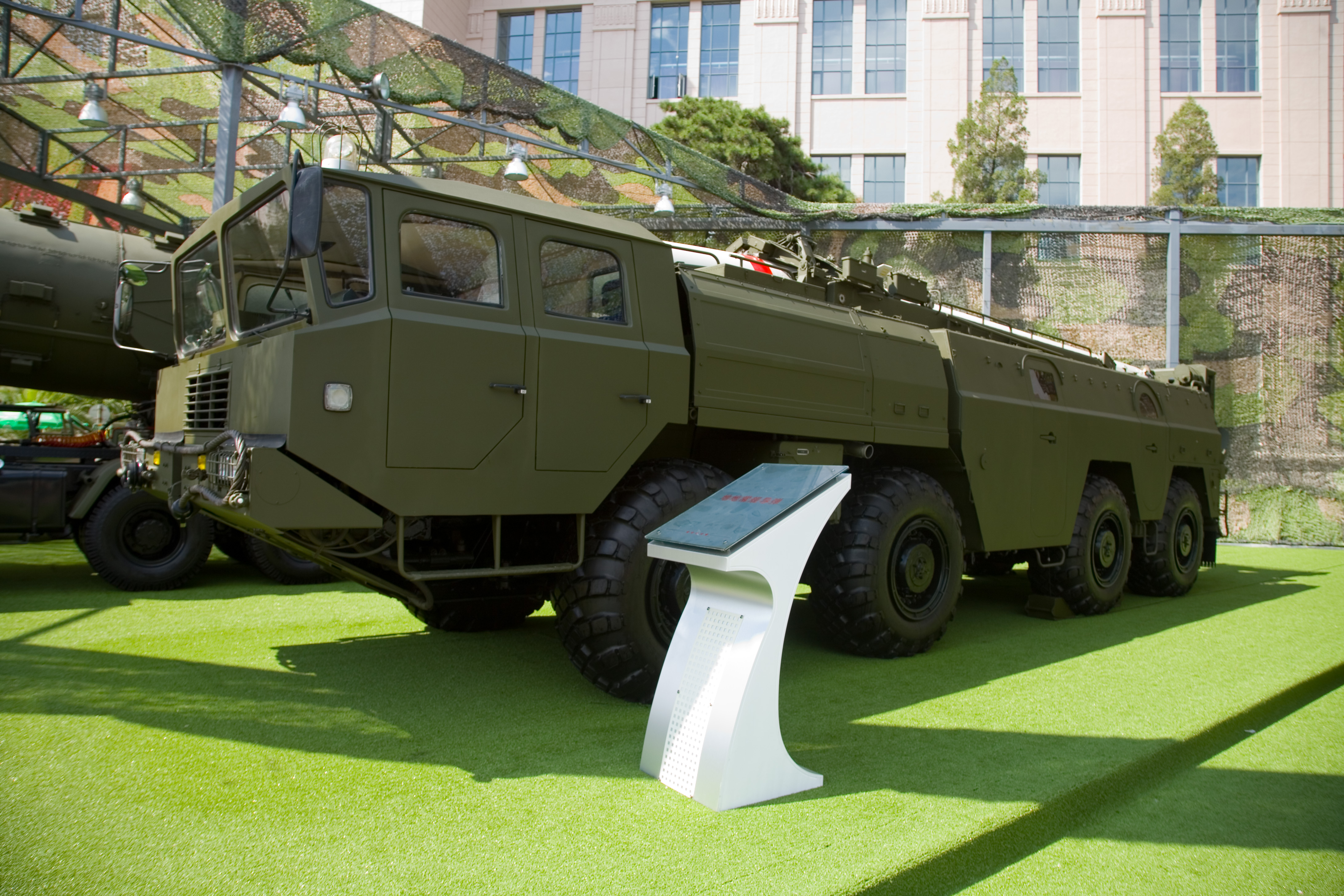
WS2400 based transporter erector launcher

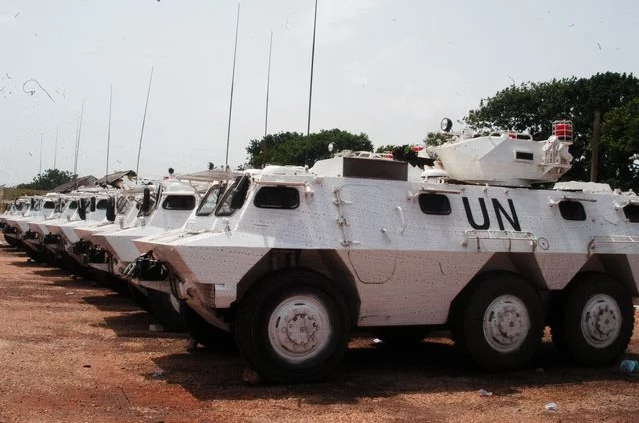
WZ-523 (ZFB-91) in UN colors

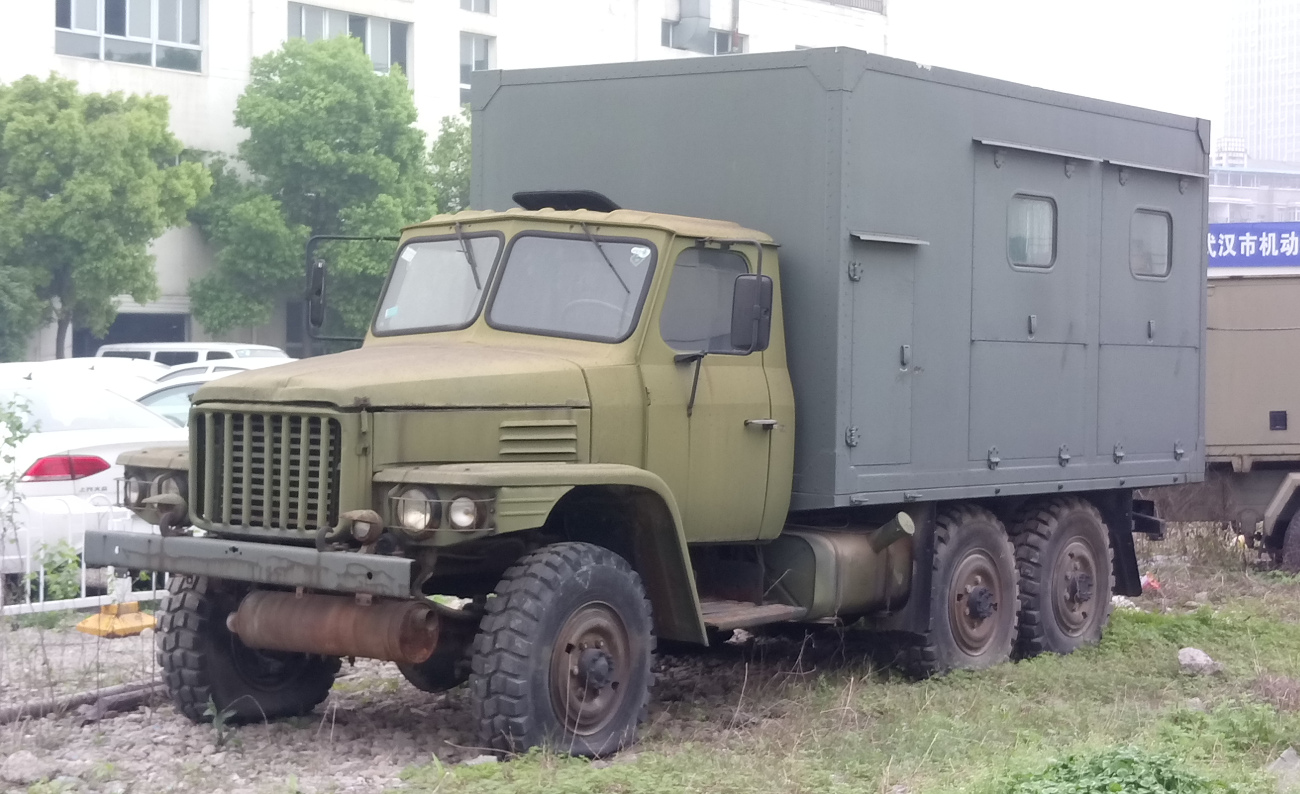
Dongfeng EQ240 in reserve

== Vessels ==
| Name | Type | Quantity | Origin | Image | Notes |
Landing craft
| Type 067 (Yunnan-class) | Landing Craft Utility | 40+ | China | | Yunnan II class |
| Type 271 (Yupen-class) | Landing Ship Medium | 100+ | China | | Later variants are bigger. |
| Yutu-class | Landing Ship Medium | 16+ | China | | |
| Yuwei-class | Landing Ship Medium | 75+ | China | | |
Logistics and support
| Type 701 (Yunsong-class) | Roll-on/roll-off | 2 | China | | |
| Fuzhong-class | Transport oiler | 1 | China | | |
| Fubing-class | Transport oiler | 8 | China | | |
| Fulei-lcass | Transport oiler | 2 | China | | |
| Huntao-class | Fleet Tug | 2 | China | | |
| Haixun III | Cutter | 1 | China | | |

== Aircraft ==
| Name | Type | Quantity | Origin | Image | Notes |
Transport aircraft
| Xian Y-7 | Transport aircraft | 2+ | China | | |
| Shaanxi Y-8 | Transport aircraft | 2 | China | | |
| Shaanxi Y-9 | Transport aircraft | 2+ | China | | |
Helicopter
| Harbin Z-21 | Attack Helicopter | | China | | |
| Changhe Z-10 | Attack helicopter | 200 | China | | |
| Harbin Z-19 | Attack helicopter | 120 | China | | |
| Changhe Z-8/Changhe Z-18 | Transport helicopter | 135 | China | | 9 Z-8A; 96 Z-8B; 6 Z-8L; 20+ Z-18 |
| Harbin Z-9 | Utility helicopter | 120 | China | | 21 Z-9A; 31 Z-9W; 10 Z-9WA; 193 Z-9WZ |
| Harbin Z-20 | Utility helicopter | 150 | China | | |
| Changhe Z-11 | Light utility helicopter | 53 | China | | |
| H120 Colibri | Light utility helicopter | 15 | France; People's Republic of China | | |
| SA342L | Utility helicopter | | France | | |
| Mil Mi-17 | Utility helicopter | 88 | USSR | | 22 Mi-17; 22 Mi-17 Hip H; 3 Mi-17-1V Hip H; 38 Mi-17V-5 Hip H; 25 Mi-17V-7 Hip H; |
| Mil Mi-8/Mil Mi-171 | Transport helicopter | 140 | USSR | | 50 Mi-8T Hip; 140 Mi-171 |
| Mil Mi-26 | Transport helicopter | 4 | USSR | | |
| Sikorsky S-70C2 | Transport helicopter | 19 | United States | | Initially a civilian variant operated by State Council-affiliated agencies for disaster relief, transport, and high-altitude logistics in Tibet and Xinjiang regions. |
Unmanned aerial vehicle
| KDV002 | UCAV | Unknown | China | | Reconnaissance and strike UAV based on the CASC CH-4. |
| Harbin BZK-005 | Heavy ISTAR | | China | | |
| Harbin BZK-009 | Heavy ISTAR | | China | | |
| BZK-006 | Medium ISTAR | | China | | Improved from WZ-6 (ASN-207). Another improved variant is known as KDV001/BZK-006A. |
| BZK-007 | Medium ISTAR | | China | | |
| BZK-008 | Medium ISTAR | | China | | Based on CH-91 |
| ASN-209 Silver Eagle | Tactical reconnaissance | | China | | Can perform generally reconnaissance and artillery reconnaissance. |
| WZ-6 (ASN-207) | Tactical reconnaissance | | China | | Can perform generally reconnaissance and artillery reconnaissance. Typically carried by armored reconnaissance vehicle, wheeled vehicles, or MV3 trucks. |

== Nomenclatural note ==
A number of PLAGF equipment names start with a three-letter code designating its type. This code is not described in any official source, but known examples generally follow pinyin acronyms.

Known decompositions of PLAGF type codes
| First Letter | Second Letter | Third Letter | Example |
|---|---|---|---|
| D 弹(Dàn) lit. 'cartridge' | A ? | P 普通(Pǔtōng) lit. 'standard' | DAP92 "cartridge, ?, standard, model 92" |
| D 弹(Dàn) lit. 'cartridge' | B 步枪(Bùqiāng) lit. 'rifle' | P 普通(Pǔtōng) lit. 'standard' | DBP87 "cartridge, rifle, standard, model 87" |
| D 弹(Dàn) lit. 'cartridge' | B 步枪(Bùqiāng) lit. 'rifle' | U 狙击(Jūjī) lit. 'marksman' | DBU141 "cartridge, rifle, marksman, model 141" |
| P 炮(Pào) lit. 'artillery' | G 高射(Gāoshè) lit. 'anti-aircraft' | Z 自行(Zìxíng) lit. 'self-propelled' | PGZ-09 "artillery, anti-aircraft, self-propelled, model 09" |
| P 炮(Pào) lit. 'artillery' | H 火箭(Huǒjiàn) lit. 'rocket' | L 轮式(Lúnshì) lit. 'wheeled' | PHL-16 "artillery, rocket, wheeled, model 16" |
| P 炮(Pào) lit. 'artillery' | L 榴弹炮(Liúdànpào) lit. 'howitzer' | L 轮式(Lúnshì) lit. 'wheeled' | PLL-09 "artillery, howitzer, wheeled, model 09" |
| Q 轻(Qīng)武器(wǔqì) lit. 'light weapon' | B 步枪(Bùqiāng) lit. 'rifle' | U 狙击(Jūjī) lit. 'marksman' | QBU-88 "light weapon, rifle, marksman, model 88" |
| Q 轻(Qīng)武器(wǔqì) lit. 'light weapon' | B 步枪(Bùqiāng) lit. 'rifle' | Z 自动(Zìdòng) lit. 'automatic' | QBZ-95 "light weapon, rifle, automatic, model 95" |
| Q 轻(Qīng)武器(wǔqì) lit. 'light weapon' | C 冲锋(Chōngfēng) lit. 'submachine gun' | W 微声(Wēishēng) lit. 'suppressed' | QCW-05 "light weapon, submachine gun, suppressed, model 05" |
| Q 轻(Qīng)武器(wǔqì) lit. 'light weapon' | G 个人(Gèrén) lit. 'personal' | F 防护(Fánghù) lit. 'protection' | QGF-03 "light weapon, personal, protection, model 03" |
| Q 轻(Qīng)武器(wǔqì) lit. 'light weapon' | L 榴弹(Liúdàn)发射器(fāshèqì) lit. 'grenade launcher' | G 挂载(Guàzǎi) lit. 'mounted/underbarrel' | QLG-10 "light weapon, grenade launcher, mounted, model 10" |
| Q 轻(Qīng)武器(wǔqì) lit. 'light weapon' | L 榴弹(Liúdàn)发射器(fāshèqì) lit. 'grenade launcher' | U 狙击(Jūjī) lit. 'marksman/sniper' | QLU-11 "light weapon, grenade launcher, sniper, model 11" |
| Q 轻(Qīng)武器(wǔqì) lit. 'light weapon' | J 机枪(Jīqiāng) lit. 'machine gun' | B 班用(Bānyòng) lit. 'squad use' | QJB-95 "light weapon, machine gun, squad use, model 95" |
| Q 轻(Qīng)武器(wǔqì) lit. 'light weapon' | S 手枪(Shǒuqiāng) lit. 'handgun' | Z 自动(Zìdòng) lit. 'automatic' | QSZ-92 "light weapon, handgun, automatic, model 92" |
| Z 装甲(Zhuāngjiǎ) lit. 'armor' | B 步战(Bùzhàn) lit. 'infantry fighting' | L 轮式(Lúnshì) lit. 'wheeled' | ZBL-08 "armor, infantry fighting, wheeled, model 08" |
| Z 装甲(Zhuāngjiǎ) lit. 'armor' | S 输送(Shūsòng) lit. 'transport' | D 履带(Lǚdài) lit. 'tracked' | ZSD-89 "armor, transport, tracked, model 89" |
| Z 装甲(Zhuāngjiǎ) lit. 'armor' | T 坦克(Tǎnkè) lit. 'tank' | Z 主战(Zhǔzhàn) lit. 'main battle' | ZTZ-99 "armor, tank, main battle, model 99" |
