= Type 89 =

Type 89 may refer to:

- PF-89, also known as Type 89, a Chinese anti-tank rocket launcher
- QLT-89, also known as Type 89 grenade discharger, a Chinese anti-tank grenade discharger developed in the 1980s.
- Type 89 Tank Destroyer, a Chinese tank destroyer
- Type 89 AFV, a Chinese armoured fighting vehicle
- Type 89 howitzer, a Chinese self-propelled howitzer
- Type 89 Chi-Ro, a Japanese World War II medium tank
- Type 89 Grenade Discharger, a Japanese World War II grenade discharger
- Type 89 machine gun, a Japanese World War II machine gun
- Howa Type 89, an assault rifle
- Mitsubishi Type 89 IFV, a Japanese infantry fighting vehicle
- Type 89 torpedo, a Japanese submarine-launched homing torpedo
- Navy Type 89 Flying boat, a Japanese patrol flying boat of the 1930s
