= Type 88 =

Type 88 may refer to:

== Aircraft ==
- Kawasaki Army Type 88 Reconnaissance Aircraft, a Japanese single-engined biplane of the late 1920s

== Artillery ==
- PGZ-88, a Chinese mobile self-propelled anti-aircraft gun also known as the Type 88
- PLZ-45, a Chinese self-propelled howitzer also known as the Type 88
- Type 88 75 mm AA Gun, a Japanese World War II antiaircraft gun

== Infantry weapons ==
- Type 88, a Chinese version of the Gewehr 88 bolt-action rifle
- QBU-88 a Chinese sniper rifle also known as the Type 88
- QJY-88, a Chinese machine gun also known as the Type 88
- Type 88, the Chinese semi-automatic version of the AK-74 assault rifle
- Type 88 assault rifle, a North Korean version of the AK-74 assault rifle

== Missiles ==
- Type 88 surface-to-ship missile, a Japanese anti-ship missile

== Tanks ==
- Type 80/88 main battle tank, a Chinese main battle tank
- Type 88 tankette, the Japanese version of the Carden Loyd tankette
