= Jonyang GDG130 =

GDG130 military backhoe loader
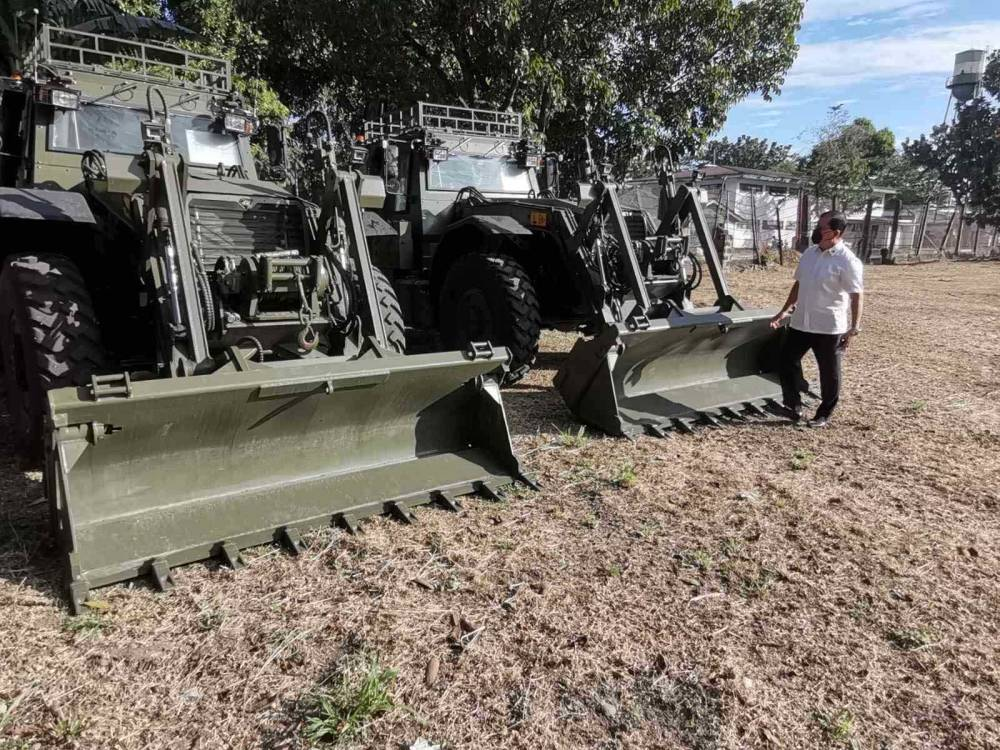
- GDG Armored Backhoe Loaders
- Type: Military engineer vehicle
- Place of origin: China

Service history
- In service: 2008-present

Production history
- Designer: ADI (now Thales Australia)
- Designed: 2004
- Manufacturer: Guizhou Jonyang Kinetics Co. Ltd.
- Produced: 2008–present

Specifications
- Mass: 13 tonnes gross weight (standard unarmored)
- Length: 8.55 meters
- Width: 2.49 meters
- Height: 3.49 meters
- Crew: 1
- Main armament: none
- Engine: Cummins 6BTA5 9C 5.9 L (360 cu in) turbo diesel
- Maximum speed: 90 kilometers per hour

The Jonyang GDG130 is a military engineering vehicle built by China's Guizhou Jonyang Kinetics Co. Ltd. (Jonyang). It is based on the High-Speed Engineer Vehicle (HSEV) developed by Australian Defence Industries (ADI), now known as Thales Australia designed for the Australian Army.

It is currently the main engineering backhoe loader of the People's Liberation Army.

The GDG130 is also the basis for Jonyang's JYL313-B civilian backhoe loader.

== Design ==
The Jonyang GDG130 was based on the High-Speed Engineer Vehicle (HSEV) developed by Australian Defence Industries (ADI), now known as Thales Australia.

In 2004, ADI started a partnership with China's Guizhou Jonyang Kinetics, which builds construction wheeled and tracked excavators and established a license production of the Australian HSEV. ADI sent 30 HSEV knock-down kits for local assembly in China by Jonyang.

The GDG130 are license production models with modifications over the original HSEV to meet the requirements of the People's Liberation Army, as well as for the civilian construction market, which Jonyang markets as the JYL313-B backhoe loader.

As a military engineer vehicle, the GDG130 is used to perform a variety of field engineering missions to support heavy combat units, including constructing trenches and defensive positions, clearing obstacles and filling ditches, as well as constructing obstacles and supporting construction work.

It is equipped with a 0.2 cubic meter backhoe bucket which can dig up trenches up to 4 meters deep, and a 0.8 cubic meter loader bucket which can be used to plough obstacles, and can be fitted with attachments and can be used as a forklift, compactor, or auger.

Some variants are fitted with an armored cabin, which includes bulletproof glass windows to protect from small caliber rounds and shrapnel, but is not equipped with any defensive weapons.

Like the ADI HSEV, the GSG130 is powered by a Cummnis 6BTA5.9C 5.9 liter turbocharged diesel engine with a maximum output of 185 horsepower and can attain a maximum speed of 90 kilometers per hour on road, and tow a trailer with a maximum weight of 8 tonnes. It also has an all-wheel drive system and can be used over rough terrain.

== Operators ==
- China
- Philippines
