= Type 701 roll-on/roll-off ship =

Chinese roll-on/roll-off ship

History

PRC
- Builder: Songliao Shipyard
- Yard number: 7814
- Sponsored by: PLAGF
- Acquired: 2013
- Commissioned: 2013
- In service: 2013

General characteristics
- Displacement: 3,500 long tons (3,600 t)
- Electronic warfare & decoys: None
- Armament: Two twin 14.5 mm machine guns
- Aircraft carried: One
- Aviation facilities: Landing pad

Type 701 roll-on/roll-off ship is a type of little known auxiliary ship currently in service with the People's Liberation Army (PLA), and a total of two units of this class have been confirmed in service as of mid-2010s. It’s worth to note that these ships belong to the People's Liberation Army Ground Force (PLAGF), instead of People's Liberation Army Navy (PLAN). Built by the PLA Factory # 7814, also more commonly known as Dalian Songliao Shipyard (大连松辽船厂) that is under the direct control of Department of Equipment of Shenyang Military Region, these ships were originally called Integrated Training Ships when the order was first placed in 2011, but when the first unit was handed over to PLA, the classification was corrected to the much more accurate roll-on/roll-off ships.

Although belong to PLA, these ships are currently heavily involved in the joint training maneuvers with PLAN, ever since the first successful landing of PLAN helicopter on board in October 2014, which is the result of PLA’s implementation of combined arms operations to deliver large number of troops in power projection by the sea. Type 701 has two chimneys and thus is likely powered by a pair of marine diesel engines. The aviation facility is limited to landing pad only, without any hangar. A bow door is also incorporated, and it is capable of delivery around two dozen armored fighting vehicles.
