= Type 85 anti-aircraft artillery =

23 mm artillery gun used by China

The Type 85 anti-aircraft artillery (Chinese: 85式23毫米双管高射炮, industrial designation YW-306) is a 23 mm artillery gun used by the People's Liberation Army of China. It is a copied version of the Soviet ZU-23-2.

== WZ554 ==
Self-propelled anti-aircraft artillery (AAA) was developed from Type 85 AAA. This is a Type 85 AAA installed in an enclosed turret mounted on a Type 90 APC. Only a limited number entered the service.

== SG ADS ==
Shengong (Deity's Bow, 神弓) Air Defense System (SG ADS) is a modernized Type 85 twin 23 mm AAA system, first revealed to Chinese public in 2005. This is an integrated air defense system consisting of 8 towed Type 85 twin 23 mm AAA, and a command vehicle. The command vehicle is based on Iron Horse (Tiema 铁马) truck and houses a more complicated electro-optical fire control system that includes IR, laser & TV subsystem, and a weapon system operator who handles this equipment, while each of the towed guns is also controlled locally by an optical sight. With water-cooled barrels, the actual rate of fire exceeds 800 rounds per minute per barrel, but the standard system is usually consisted of air-cooled barrels for weight reduction, resulting in a decreased rate of fire. Two types of ammo are standard and both have the same weight: 0.45 kg, other types of ammo are also available upon customer's request. Each command vehicle can command an AAA company consisted of 8 guns, but each individual gun can also fire independently.

Specifications:

- Propulsion: towed
- Maximum length: 2.555 meter
- Maximum weight: 950 kg (with air-cooled barrel)
- Maximum effective range: 2.5 mi
- Maximum effective altitude: 1.5 mi
- Maximum actual rate of fire: 800 rd/min/barrel (with water-cooled barrel)
- Maximum target speed: Slightly higher than Mach 1
- Ammo: WBO-44P incendiary tracer round & WB-148P armor-piercing incendiary tracer round
- Local fire control: WPO-12 aiming sight
- Command & control: separate C2 vehicle with electro-optical FCS
- Kill probability: > 95% when target speed is ≤ 250 m/s.

== Operators ==
- China
- Ecuador
- Myanmar: 380 Type 87.
