= Type 19 infantry fighting vehicle =

Chinese amphibious armored vehicle

The Type 19 Infantry Fighting Vehicle (Chinese: 19式步兵战车; pinyin: Yāo jiǔ shì bùbīng zhàn chē) is a family of eight-wheeled amphibious, modular armored vehicle of the People's Republic of China. It improves upon and replaces the Type 08 wheeled armored vehicle family. The vehicle is also deployed in the Western Theater Command.

== History and development ==
In June 2020, a new type of 8x8 armored vehicle was observed in development to replace the Type 08 wheeled armored vehicle. In 2023, the vehicle entered service and was reportedly designated Type 19. Type 19 is the third-generation wheeled armored fighting vehicle of Chinese origin, after WZ-551 and Type 08. Overall, Type 19 is an upgraded iteration of Type 08 armored vehicle.

In November 2021, the vehicle was observed in deployment with Eastern Theater Command of the People's Liberation Army, specifically in the Guangdong region by Taiwan Strait. The vehicle is also expected to be inducted by the People's Liberation Army Navy Marine Corps.

== Design ==
=== Chassis ===
The vehicle layout of the Type 19 is similar to that of the previous Type 08 vehicles, with the driver and engine bay at the front and the troop compartment in the middle. However, unlike Type 08, Type 19 features an unmanned weapon station as a turret, offering a more spacious interior for the dismounted infantry. The crew consists of three people: the driver, the gunner, and the commander.

=== Armament ===
The armament consists of one barrel of 30 mm autocannon, one 5.8 mm coaxial machine gun, and four HJ-16 anti-tank guided missiles. The anti-tank guided missiles are mounted in an armored enclosure located on the right-hand side of the turret, with armored plates protecting its side. The HJ-16 missile is developed from an export-oriented QN-502C missile, with fire-and-forget launch mode, TV/thermal dual-mode seeker, inertial guidance, man-in-the-loop target datalink, 10 km (6.2 mi) of range, and armor penetration capability of 1000 mm. The missile can attack helicopters and target ground vehicles from top-attack angles.

=== Sensors ===
The electric-optical sensor, meteorological sensor, communication suite, Beidou satellite positioning system antenna, laser warning system receivers, and identification friend or foe (IFF) system are mounted on the turret top. The vehicle body is fitted with multiple distributed aperture systems to detect threats from all angles. The turret features exposed connector panels for installing observation equipment, sensors, and possibly an active protection system.

=== Protection ===
The Type 19 hull is constructed with high-strength steel and layered with modular composite armor panels. The armor provides 360-degree protection against 7.62 mm round, frontal protection against 14.5 mm armor-piercing rounds, and limited protection of 25 mm and 30 mm rounds. The hull is mine-resistant.

According to Janes Information Services, the vehicle is expected to be heavier than its predecessor due to having better armor protection. Composite armor plates are bolted on the turret and vehicle body to improve ballistic protection, with provisions for mounting reactive armour (ERA) blocks. The air conditioning system and engine exhaust are concealed for thermal signature reduction.

=== Mobility ===
The mobility of Type 19 is reportedly similar to its predecessor, powered by Deutz BF6M1015C, developing 440 hp. The vehicle suspension is hydraulic with height adjustment system, reportedly redesigned from Type 08 to support the extra weight and improve driving performance.

== Variants ==
Infantry Fighting Vehicle (IFV) variant
Feautres 30 mm autocannon, one 5.8 mm coaxial machine gun, and four HJ-16 anti-tank guided missiles.
Assault gun variant (FSV)
Features a 105mm rifled gun.
Armored personnel carrier (APC) variant
Features an enlarged troop compartment.

== Operators ==
China

- People's Liberation Army Ground Force

== See also ==
- Type 08
