= VP22 =

Family of Chinese military vehicles

The VP22 is a family of armored, MRAP transport and patrol all-terrain vehicles, manufactured by China North Industries Corporation (Norinco). It is the 6x6 derivation of the BeiBen Truck Kaijia 8x8 MRAP vehicle (Chinese: 铠甲 8x8; pinyin: Kǎi jiǎ; lit. 'armor'). The intended role for VP22 is to operate in high threat areas that requires mine protection capability. It can transport troops and cargo in the armored cabin. The VP22 has a modular design. Several mission modules can be fitted onto the chassis, including troop transport, command post, and armored ambulance.

== History ==
The VP22 MRAP truck is based on BeiBen Kaijia 8x8 MRAP transport truck, which is revealed at Zhuhai Airshow in 2016. The 8x8 variant is designated as VP23, while the 6x6 variant receives designation of VP22. The vehicle has armor protection for crew and critical components.

In March 2020, Chinese state media shows footage of VP22 MRAP operated alongside People's Liberation Army Ground Force infantry in an off-road terrain environment.

== Design ==
VP22 is derived from the BeiBen Kaijia heavy-duty high-mobility tactical truck, which is powered by a 323 kW (439 hp) diesel engine with an automatic transmission.

Armor of the VP22 provides protection against small arms fire and artillery shrapnel. This vehicle features a V-shaped hull and provides protection against mine blast and improvised explosive device (IED).

== Variants ==
VP22
6x6 chassis variant. In service with People's Liberation Army.
VP23
8x8 chassis variant.

== Operators ==
People's Republic of China

- People's Liberation Army Ground Force
