= Type 89 (tank destroyer) =

Type 89 self-propelled tank destroyer
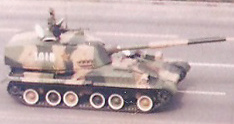
- PTZ-89 tank destroyer in 1999
- Type: Tank destroyer
- Place of origin: China

Service history
- In service: 1989–2015
- Used by: China

Production history
- Designed: 1982
- Manufacturer: Norinco
- Produced: 1989–1995
- No. built: 230

Specifications
- Mass: 31 tons
- Length: 5.6m
- Width: 2.8m
- Height: 3.12m
- Crew: 4
- Armor: 50 mm
- Main armament: 120 mm gun
- Secondary armament: 12.7mm HMG, 7.62mm MG
- Engine: WR4B-12V150LB diesel 520 hp
- Power/weight: 16 hp/t
- Suspension: torsion bar
- Operational range: 450 km
- Maximum speed: 55 km/h

The Type 89 tank destroyer (military designation PTZ-89, industrial designation WA320) is a Chinese armored, tracked, tank destroyer vehicle developed by Norinco for the People’s Liberation Army. The vehicle was developed in the 1980s and entered service in 1989.

== Development ==
Armed with a 120-millimeter smoothbore gun, it was intended to combat newer generations of Western and Russian main battle tanks that were equipped with composite armor and 120 and 125-millimeter caliber guns. Despite a successful development process, with the end of the Cold War it became apparent that the weapon was no longer needed. Production was halted in 1995 after around 100 examples had been built, though the International Institute for Strategic Studies estimated 230 vehicles were built until retirement. An official retirement ceremony was held by the 39th Army Group on 3 November 2015.

== Operators ==
- China
  - People's Liberation Army Ground Force: 230 built and in-storage (no longer in active service)

== See also ==
- Type 11 Assault vehicle
- AFT-10 ATGM Carrier
