= PGZ-88 =

Chinese self-propelled anti-aircraft gun

The Type 88 self-propelled anti-aircraft gun (military designation: PGZ-88 – Chinese: 88式自行高射炮; pinyin: bābā shì zìxíng gāoshèpào, "Type 88 self-propelled anti-aircraft artillery") is a Chinese self-propelled anti-aircraft vehicle manufactured by Norinco. Developed since the early 1980s, Type 88 was the first fully-automatic SPAAG system produced by China. The vehicle chassis is based on Type 79 tank, and armaments include Type 74 twin-37 millimeter cannons, a surveillance radar, electro-optical sensor, ballistic computer, and friend or foe identification system. The system was only used in the People's Liberation Army for limited evaluation trials.
