= Type 89 grenade discharger (China) =

QLT-89
- Type: Mortar / grenade discharger
- Place of origin: China

Service history
- Used by: China

Specifications
- Mass: 3.8 kg
- Length: 600 mm
- Crew: 1
- Cartridge: 50 mm grenade
- Muzzle velocity: 100 m/s
- Effective firing range: 200 to 800 meters

The QLT-89, also known as the Type 89 grenade discharger, is a lightweight grenade launcher developed by China in the 1980s, used for individual squad-level indirect fire support. The design was finalized in the early 1990s. The weapon entered the Chinese service in the 1990s and was observed in deployment with special forces and Hong Kong Garrison.

The grenade discharge is 600mm in length and weighs 3.8 kg. An iron sight is mounted at the top, supporting 4 chevrons for 200, 400, 600, and 800 meters. The grenade discharger can fire several types of munitions: the 50mm anti-personnel fragmentation grenade, the 50 mm illumination grenade, the 50 mm incendiary grenade, and the 50mm smoke grenade. The fragmentation grenade is 330 mm in length and weighs 700 grams. The warhead contains 800 fragments and has a blast radius of 16 meters. The round uses a contact-type fuse with a 19 to 30-second delayed fuse for redundancy.

Variants include QLT-89 or QLT-89A, and by 2026, further improved variants were developed to provide organic indirect fire support to squad-level combat units.

== See also ==
- Commando mortar
- LGI Mle F1
- Type 89 grenade discharger
