= PHL-11 =

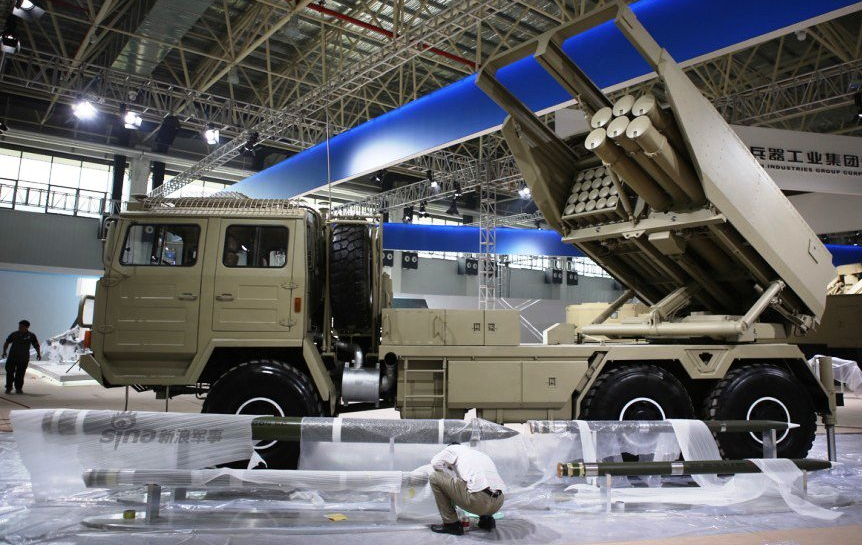
- The original PHL-11 has a Shaanxi SX2190 chassis and loads two 20-rocket pods. The export version SR-5, seen here, uses a Taian truck as a base, and has variable weapons load, such as 20- or 6-rocket pods.
- Type: Self-propelled rocket launcher Rocket artillery
- Place of origin: China

Service history
- Wars: 2025 Cambodia-Thailand conflict

Production history
- Manufacturer: Norinco
- Produced: 2013 – present

Specifications
- Mass: 20 tons
- Crew: 3
- Caliber: 122 mm (4.8 in) (missiles)
- Barrels: 40
- Traverse: 360°
- Rate of fire: 40 missiles in 30 seconds
- Effective firing range: 40 km
- Maximum firing range: 50 km (extended range ammunition)
- Main armament: 122 mm rockets
- Engine: Weichai WD615-77A diesel 206kW

The PHL-11 is a truck-mounted self-propelled 122 mm multiple rocket launcher (SPMRL) produced by Norinco for the People's Liberation Army Ground Force. It is a modernised replacement for the older PHL-81.

== Development ==
The PHL-11 is derived from the SR-4 multiple rocket launcher designed for export which was, in turn, developed from the PHL-81 multiple rocket launcher. It was adopted by the People's Liberation Army under the PHL-11 designation.

The PHZ-11 shares similar armaments with the PHL-11, but with a tracked chassis.

== Design ==
Each PHL-11 is equipped with 40 122 mm rockets mounted on a swivel mount with 2 pods of 20 rockets each. The SR-5 export version is fitted with 2 modular rocket pods able to carry either 20 122 mm or 6 220 mm rockets in each pod.

Each SR-4 launcher vehicle is usually paired with a reloading vehicle based on a Shaanxi 8x8 military truck fitted with a crane. It carries pods of rocket reloads and reloads the launcher vehicles. As such, reloading time has been cut from 10 minutes to 5 minutes.

The vehicle is equipped with a fire control computer and CBRN protection for the crew.

The PHL-11 can also fire 122mm DTI-2 rockets manufactured by Thailand's Defense Technology Institute.

=== Chassis ===
The vehicle used is a 6x6 Shaanxi SX2190KA. The vehicle is equipped with a 206KW Weichai WD615-77A straight-six diesel engine paired with 9 speed manual transmission. The vehicle can reach a speed of 80 km/h and has off-road capability. Another variant features armor plates on windows, including fold up plates on side windows and blind curtain armor on the frontal windscreen.

== Variants ==
PHL-11
Base variant using 6x6 Shaanxi SX2190KA truck chassis

PHZ-11
Based on tracked vehicle chassis similar to PLZ-05 and PGZ-09.

SR-4
Export version of PHL-11 using 6x6 Shaanxi SX2190KA truck chassis

SR-5
Export version with 2 modular rocket pods using 6x6 Taian TA5310 truck chassis. Each pod is able to carry either 20 x 122 mm, 6 x 220 mm rockets, 1 x 610 mm King Dragon 300 ballistic missile, 1 x C-705 anti-ship missile, or various loitering munitions and drones.

The SR-5 is a fully computerized and digitized system. It reduces operational costs by allowing multiple types of ammunition to be adapted to a single chassis using the same fire control and support systems.

SR-7
The SR-7 is a lightweight, scaled-down variant, with either one pod of twenty 122 mm rockets or six 220 mm rockets. The maximum range is 50 km for the 122 mm rocket and 70 km for the 220 mm rocket. First unveiled in IDEX 2017 mounted on a 6x6 assault vehicle (presumably Dongfeng Mengshi).

PHL-20
Designation of SR-7 in PLAGF service.

PHL-21
Truck chassis based on the FAW MV3 series of tactical trucks, specifically the 4x4 CTM-133 variant, similar to the ones used on PCL-161 lightweight howitzer. It uses the same scaled down one pod of twenty 122 mm rockets as the SR-7. It has been observed in PLA service.

== Operators ==
Algeria

- 40+ SR-5

Deliveries were underway in late-2017.

Bahrain

- 4 SR-5

Burkina Faso

China

- People's Liberation Army Ground Force - As of 2022, 350 units of PHL-11; 120 units of PHZ-11; 30 units of PHL-20; 10+ units of PHL-21.

Jordan

- SR-5

Laos

- 12 SR-5

Thailand

- 4 SR-4

4 SR-4 ordered in 2012 and delivered in 2013.

UAE

- SR-5

Venezuela

- 18 units of SR-5 variant.

== See also ==
- PHL-03: Chinese truck-mounted 300 mm multiple rocket launcher.
- PHL-16: Chinese truck-mounted 370 mm multiple rocket launcher.

== Sources ==
- The International Institute for Strategic Studies (2022). The Military Balance 2022. Routledge. ISBN 978-1-032-27900-8.
