= PHL-81 =

Chinese self-propelled rocket launcher

Type 81 rocket launcher
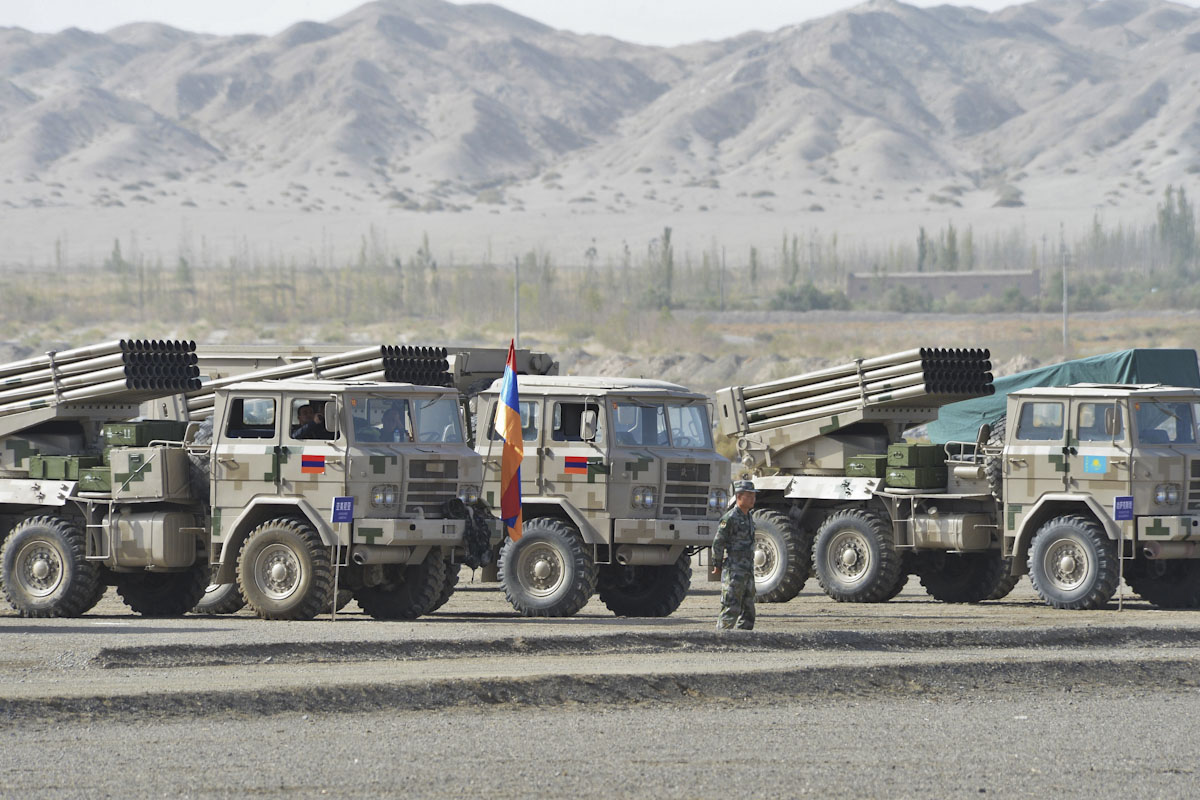
- Type: Self-propelled rocket launcher Rocket artillery
- Place of origin: China

Service history
- Wars: 2006 Lebanon War; 2025 Cambodia–Thailand clashes

Production history
- Designed: 1987
- Manufacturer: Jinxi Machinery Factory Hubei Jiangshan Machinery Factory
- Produced: 1989–present

Specifications
- Mass: 18 to 30 tons
- Length: 9.8 m (32 ft 2 in)
- Width: 3.24 m (10 ft 8 in)
- Height: 3.50 m (11 ft 6 in) with AAMG
- Crew: 5
- Caliber: 122 mm (4.8 in) (missiles)
- Barrels: 40
- Traverse: 360°
- Main armament: 122 mm rockets
- Secondary armament: 12.7 mm anti-aircraft machine gun
- Engine: WR4B-12V150LB 12-cyl diesel 520 hp (382 kW)
- Suspension: torsion bar
- Operational range: 450 km (280 mi)
- Maximum speed: 55 km/h (35 mph)

The PHL-81 is a truck-mounted self-propelled 122 mm multiple rocket launcher (SPMRL) produced by the People's Republic of China for the People's Liberation Army Ground Force.

The PHL-81 is being replaced by the modernised version PHL-11.

== Design and development ==
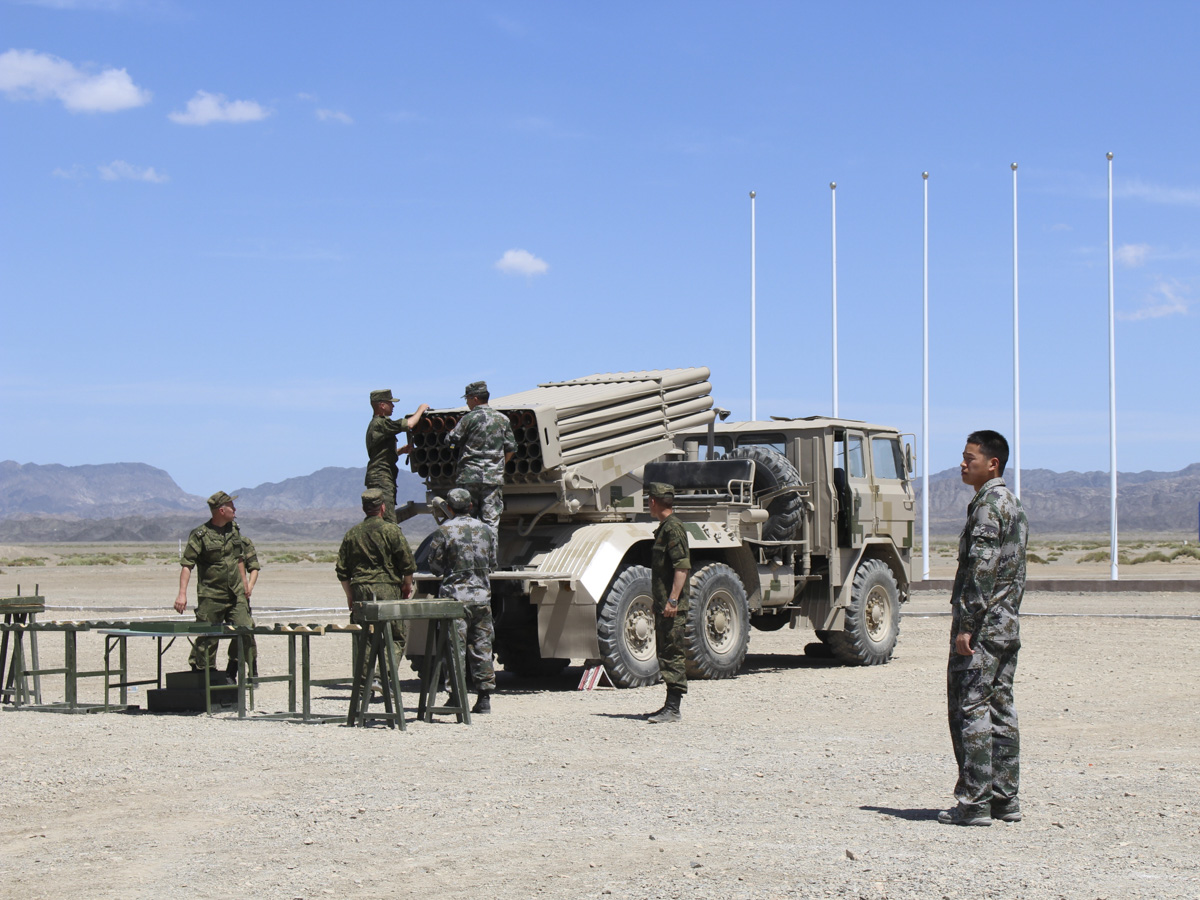
Rear view of Type 81 MLRS (SX250 chassis)

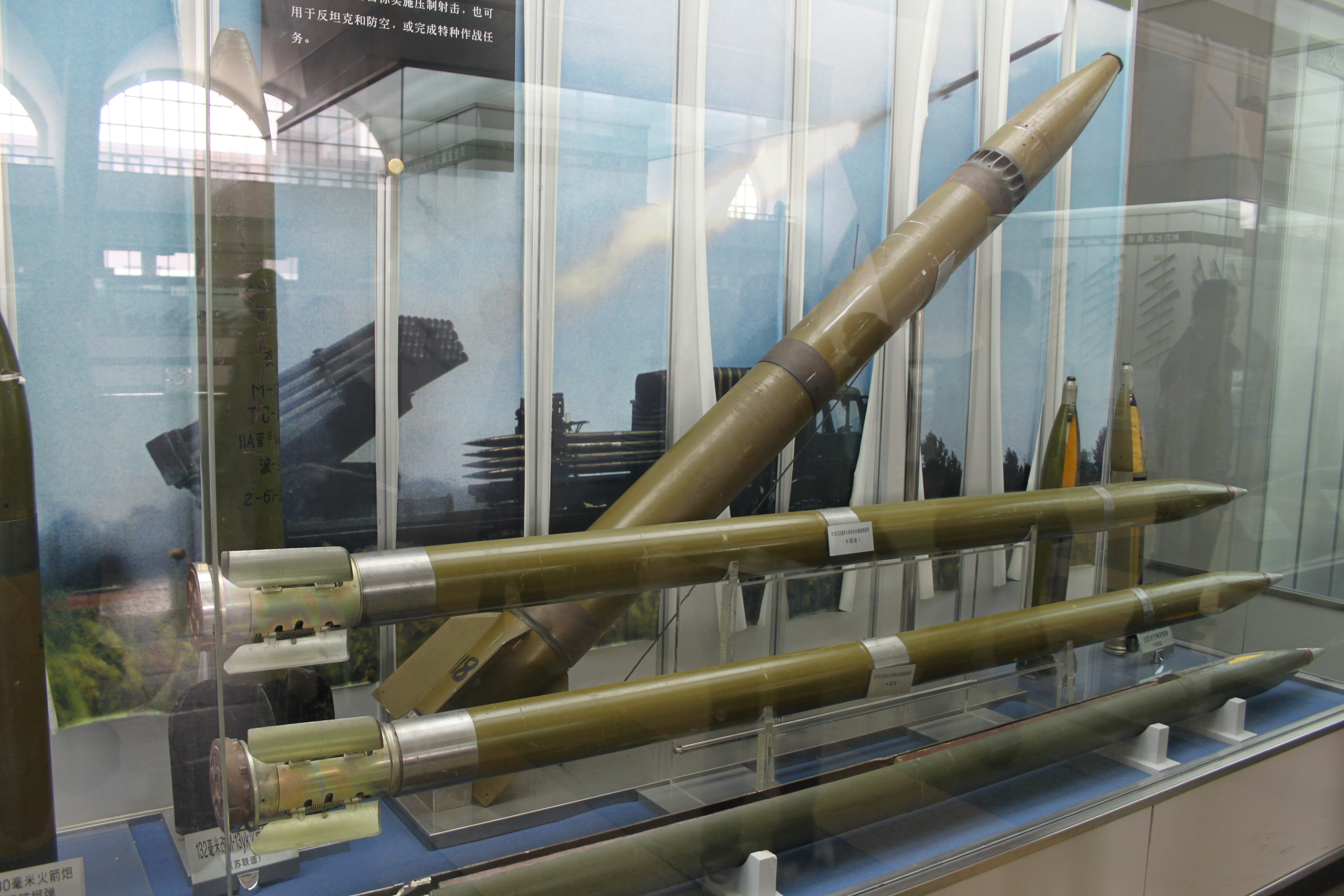
122mm rockets used on the Type 81

It is a variant of the Soviet BM-21 Grad. The Type 81 was the first in a family of Chinese self-propelled 122 mm rocket launchers.

The system forms the backbone of the People's Liberation Army Ground Force's combined arms brigade. Type 81 went through different iterations of modernization to improve the combat effectiveness.

The spin-stabilized rocket fired by the Type 81 may be armed with a high explosive warhead or a steel fragmentation warhead.

== Variants ==
Type 81
Designation: PHL-81. The Type 81 mounts a 40-round launcher on an Hongyan CQ261 6X6 truck chassis. The truck was later changed to a Shaanxi SX250 in 1975.
Type 83
Improved variant of Type 81. The Type 83 mounts a 24-round launcher on a 6x6 truck chassis.
Type 89
Designation PHZ-89. This is an improved variant of the original Type 81 MRL system. It was adopted by the PLA in 1989. The Type 89 mounts a new type of 40-round box launcher on the armored tracked chassis of the Type 83 self-propelled gun. The rockets may be fired in 20 seconds. The launcher is mounted at the rear with a reload pack in front.
Type 90
Designation PHL-90. The Type 90 shares the 40-round launcher with PHZ-89, but the rockets are mounted on a Tiema SC2030 6X6 truck. The truck also carries a reload pack of 40 additional rockets; the launcher to be reloaded within 3 minutes.
Type 90A
Designation PHL-90A. The Type 90A is an upgrade of the Type 90. The 40-round launcher is mounted on a Tiema XC2200 6×6 truck, has improved fire control, and a battery may be remotely controlled by a command vehicle. It is manufactured by Norinco.
Type 90B
The Type 90B is an upgrade of the Type 90A. The 40-round launchers are mounted on a Beifang Benchi 2629 6×6 trucks. The system adds WZ551 reconnaissance vehicles, and the command vehicle has improved command and fire control systems.

== Operators ==
Cambodia

- Royal Cambodian Army − 20 PHL-81 and some PHL-90B (Type 90B) as of 2025

Chad

- Chadian Ground Forces − 5 units in service as of 2025

China

- People's Liberation Army Ground Force − 200 units of PHL-81/PHL-90; 375 units of PHZ-89; 1,000 units of PHL-81 in storage as of 2025

Gabon

- Gabonese Army − 4 units of Type 90 were delivered in 2004

Ghana

- Ghana Army − 3 units in service as of 2025

Hezbollah

- Origin unknown. Approximately 118 rockets were fired during the 2006 Lebanon War

Indonesia

- Indonesian Marine Corps − 4 PHL-90B as of 2025

Myanmar

- Myanmar Army − Type 81. Unknown number in service as of 2025

Namibia

- Namibian Army − 3 units in service as of 2025

Pakistan

- Pakistan Army − 52 Type 83 as of 2025. Produced locally as the Azar

Peru

- Peruvian Army − 27 units of Type 90B as of 2025

Sudan

- Sudanese Land Forces − PHL-81. Unknown number in service as of 2025

Togo

- Togolese Army − Type 81. Unknown number in service as of 2025

== See also ==
- PHL-03: Chinese truck-mounted 300 mm multiple rocket launcher.
- PHL-16: Chinese truck-mounted 370 mm multiple rocket launcher.
