= Shaanxi HMV3 =

Family of Chinese military trucks

Shaanxi Automobile Group HMV3
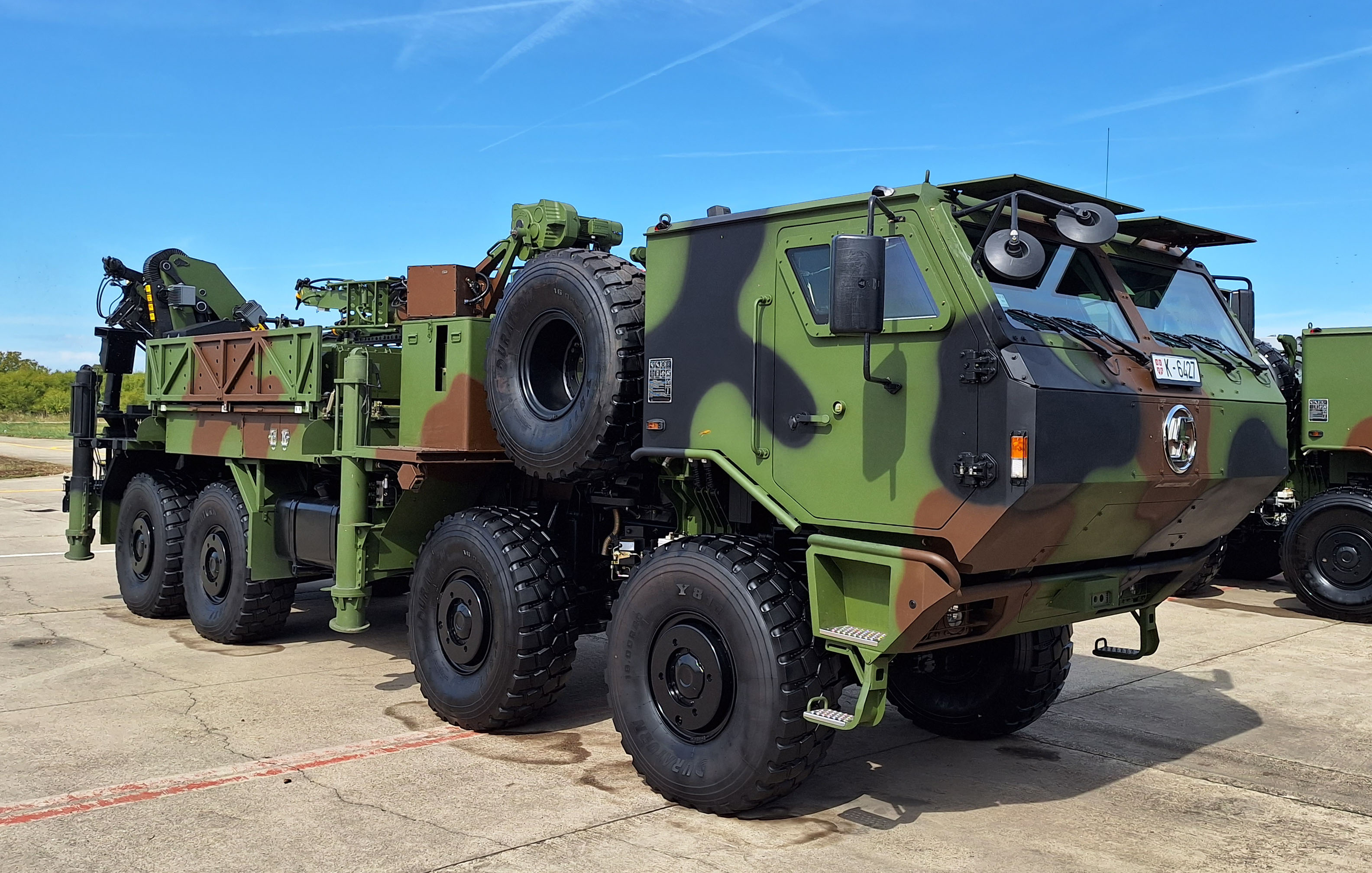
- Shaanxi SX2306 carrying HQ-17AE's munition reload system
- Type: Family of 6x6 and 8x8 tactical trucks with 7-ton and 10-ton payload.
- Place of origin: China

Service history
- In service: From 2019
- Used by: People's Liberation Army

Production history
- Manufacturer: Shaanxi Automobile Group

Specifications
- Engine: diesel engine 350–450 hp (260–340 kW)
- Payload capacity: 7–10 tonnes (7,000–10,000 kg) (cross-country); 15–20 tonnes (15,000–20,000 kg) (road-mobile)
- Suspension: Wheel 6x6 or 8x8 independent
- Operational range: 800 km
- Maximum speed: 100 km/h (62 mph)

The Shaanxi HMV3 is the third generation military truck developed by Shaanxi Automobile Group. The HMV3 is the standardized military truck designed for the Chinese People's Liberation Army (PLA). The utility truck has two configurations, Shaanxi SX2220 (6x6) and Shaanxi SX2306 (8x8), both featuring cross-country mobility. The truck also comes with a semi-rigid chassis, independent suspension, an automatic transmission, and an armored cab. It's the Chinese equivalent of US Army M977 HEMTT.

Shaanxi Automobile Group won the Army bid in 2017 against other manufacturers. In 2018, the HMV3 underwent prototype testing in military units. In 2019, the vehicle was officially inducted into the PLA as the next-generation universal heavy tactical truck for heavy-duty logistics and transportation, replacing the earlier Huanghe JN252.

== Variants ==
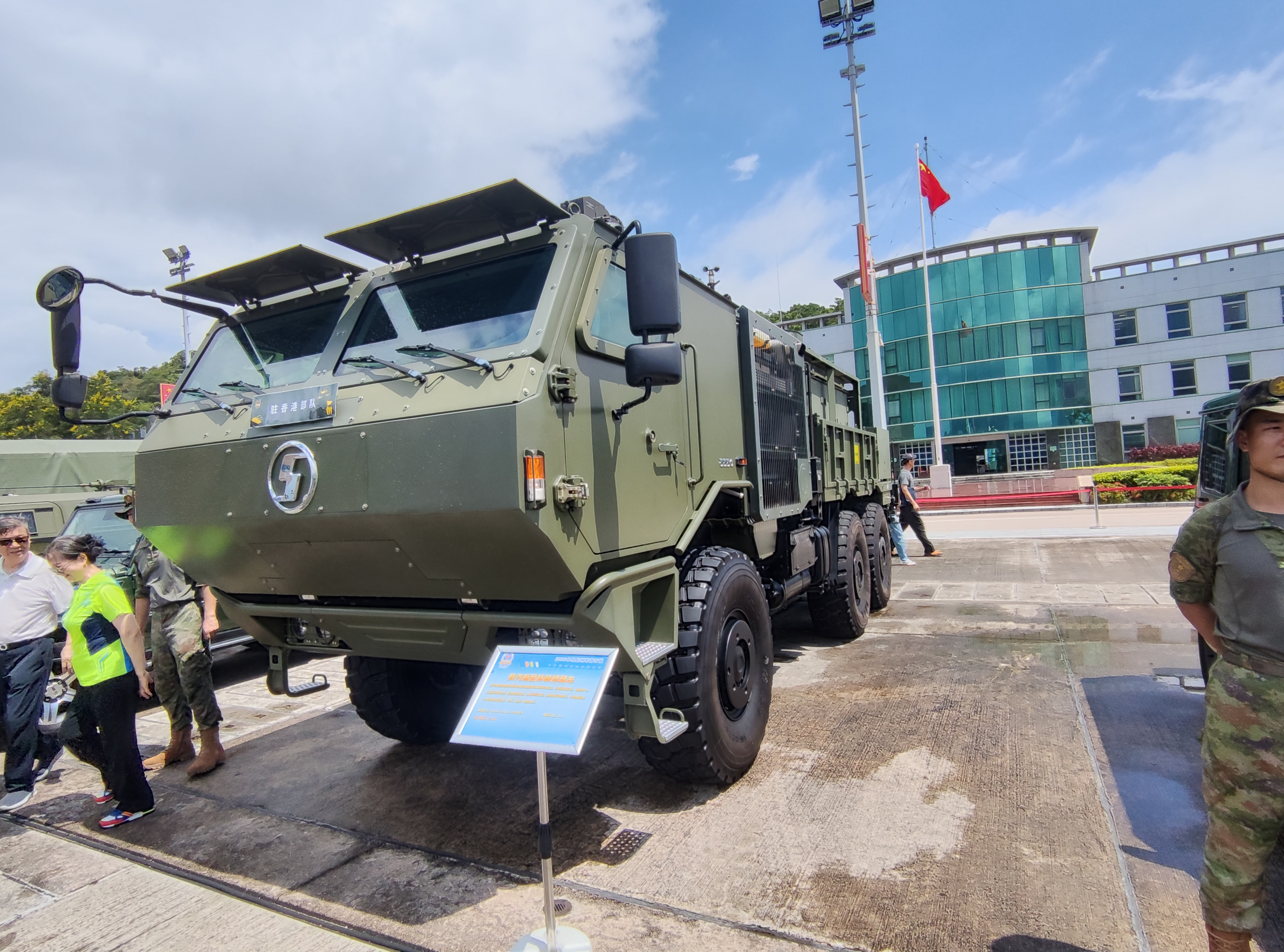
SX2220

Shaanxi SX2220
7 tonnes (7,000 kg) (off-road) payload with 6x6 chassis.
Shaanxi SX2306
10 tonnes (10,000 kg) (off-road) payload with 8x8 chassis.
