= Shaanxi Automobile Group =

Chinese truck and bus manufacturer

Shaanxi Automobile Group Co., Ltd.
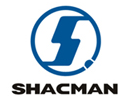
- Type: Private
- Traded as: Shacman Automobile
- Industry: Automotive
- Founded: 1968 (Xi'an)
- Headquarters: Jingwei industrial park, Economic and Technological zone, Xi'an, Shaanxi, China
- Area served: Worldwide
- Key people: Hongming Yuan (General Manager)
- Products: Buses; Trucks
- Revenue: 31 billion RMB (2011)
- Number of employees: 23,000
- Subsidiaries: Shaanxi Heavy Duty Automobile Co., Ltd. Shaanxi Hande Axle Co., Ltd. Xi'an Cummins Engine Co., Ltd. (50%); Shaanxi Tonglia Special Vehicle Co., Ltd. Shaanxi Automobile & Machinery Co., Ltd.
- Website: www.shacman.com

Shaanxi Automobile Group Co., Ltd., trading as Shacman, is a Chinese bus and truck manufacturer with headquarters in Xi'an, Shaanxi, China.

== Overview ==
Founded in 1968 and currently located in Xi'an, Shaanxi Provence, it employs approximately 23,000 employees. It manufactures medium-size and heavy-duty trucks (both branded as Shacman), bus chassis and heavy-duty truck axles. It utilizes Magna Steyr and MAN SE technologies. Its bus chassis are sold under the Eurostar Bus brand. The company has its presence in 140 countries worldwide, with 40 corporate offices and 280 service stations.

Mazouz Trade Group, a Setif based company and Shaanxi Automobile set up the first Shacman manufacturing plant in Algeria in 2018 which made them the first Chinese automobile manufacturer to do so. As the country already had 40,000 trucks exported into the nation before 2018 which made them the market leader with 80% market share. With serving the local economy, the company would also focus on neighboring countries like Tunisia and Mali.

Shaanxi Automobile Group Co. Ltd entered into a joint venture with Rawal Industrial Equipment (Pvt) Ltd, Pakistan to manufacture trucks and prime movers locally in 2019.

Shacman set up their first plant in Querétaro, Mexico in 2023 which will manufacture X3000, X5000 and L3000 powered by LNG and diesel engines. This plant was set up to eliminate logistics cost and capture North America market. The state of Querétaro provided the company facilities and security to operate.

In 2023 Shaanxi developed their X6000 800 which is the most powerful tractor truck in the world powered by a 16.6 liter Weichai engine producing 800 hp and 3,750 nm torque beating Scania 770 and Volvo FH 750 available in 6x4 tractor unit configuration and currently being produced in China and Russia with future plans to start production in Argentina.

In late 2024, Shacman heavy trucks started its production in Kyrgyzstan the plant was set up in Bishkek capital Kyrgyzstan of months before the production start up.

In early 2025, the Chinese government provided 90 H3000 6×4 trucks and tankers, and 45 H3000S 6×4 tractors to the Burkina Faso Armed Forces.

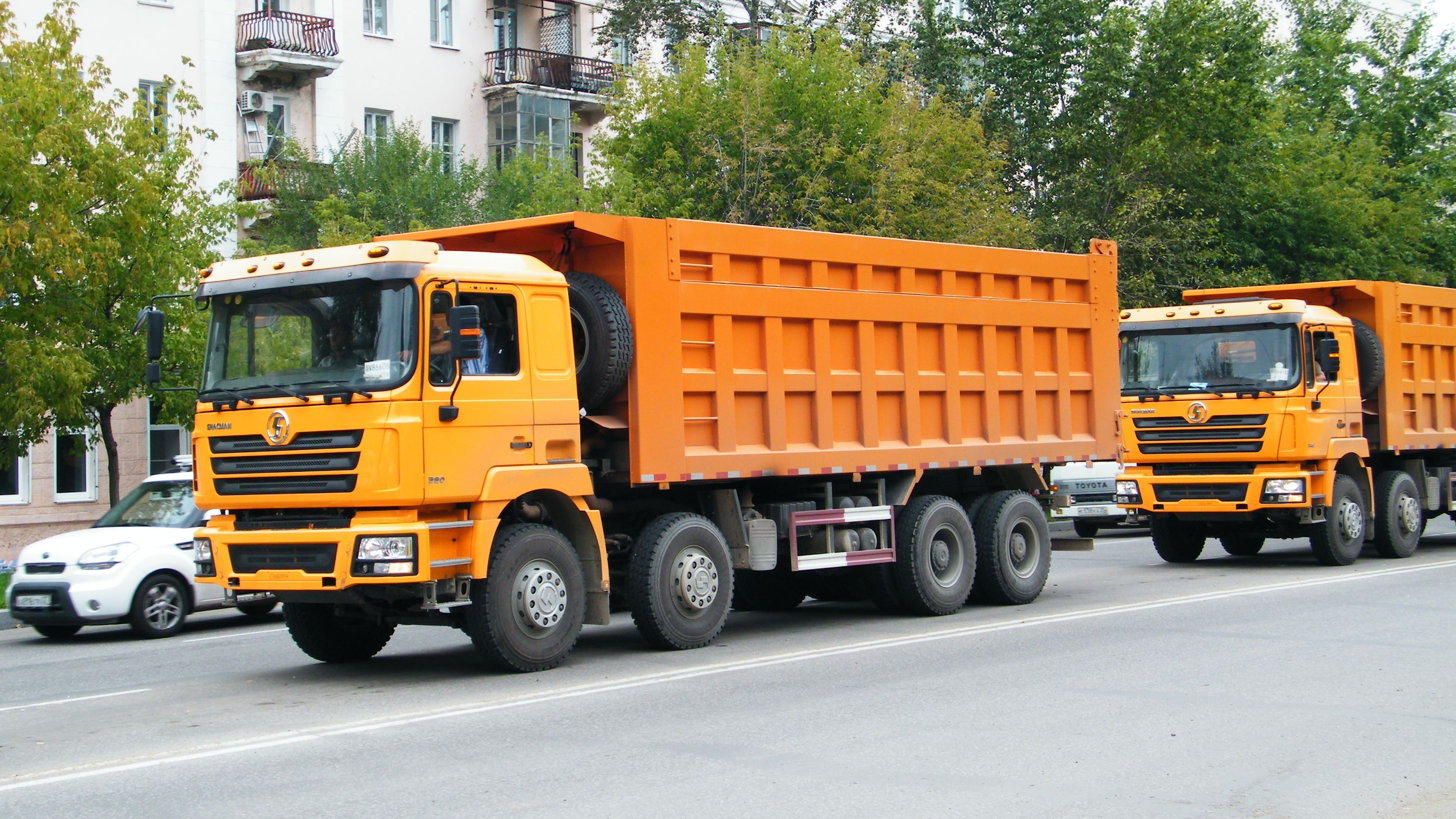
A Shacman Vehicle

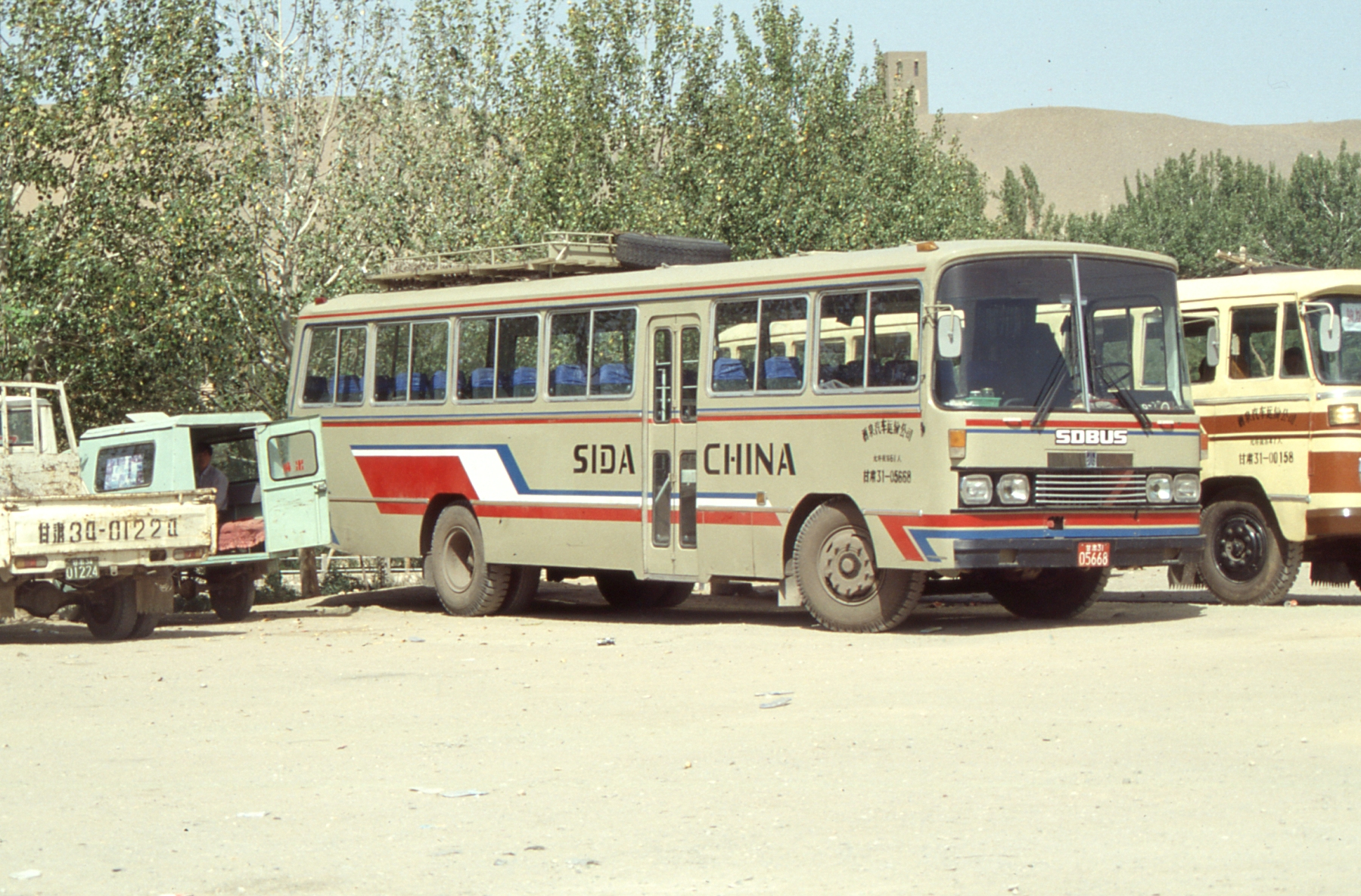
Sida SX680 using Shaanxi chassis

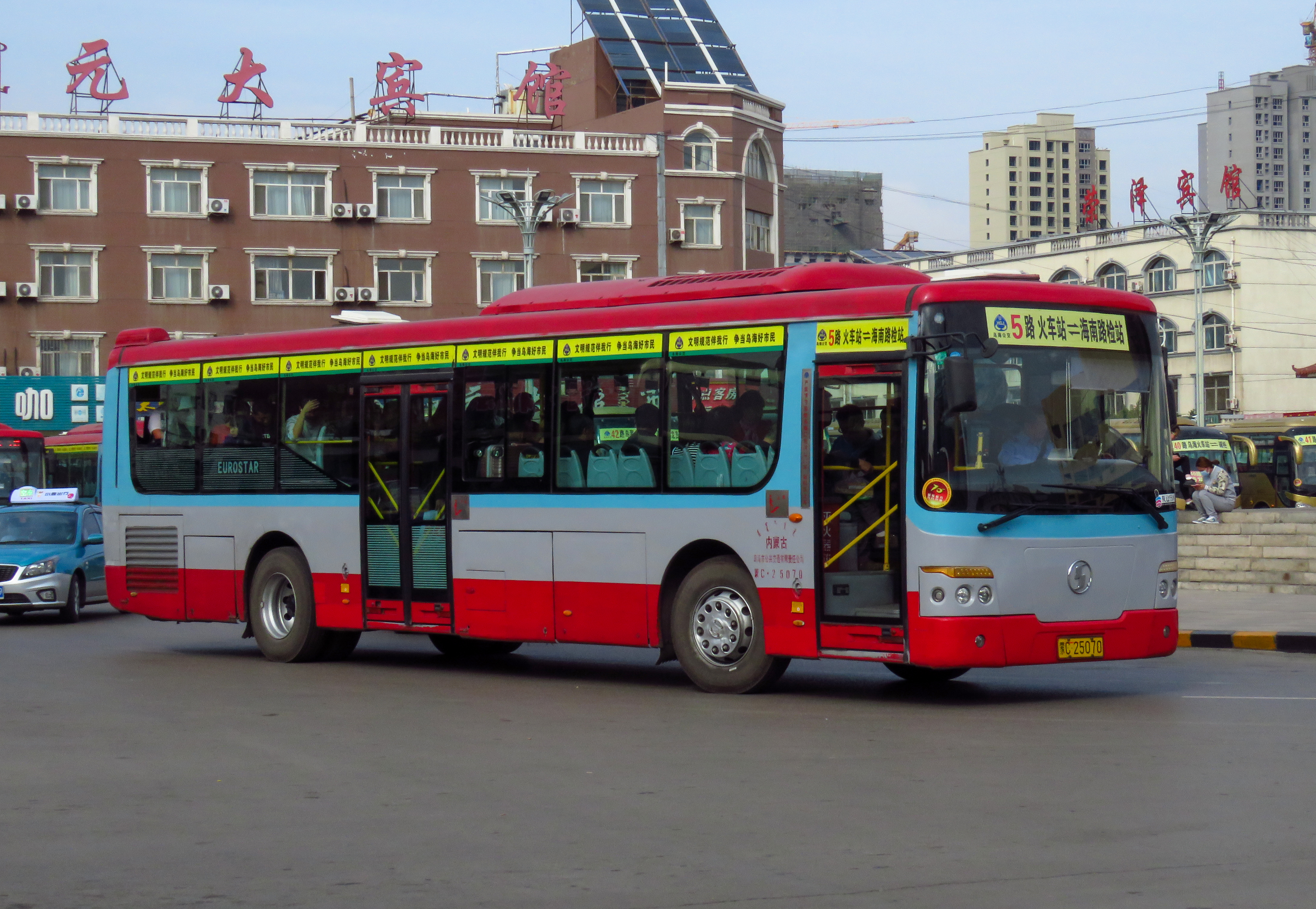
A Shaanxi Eurostar bus in Wuhai, Inner Mongolia

== Shacman Products ==
=== Heavy Duty Vehicles ===
- Shaanxi SX2220 (HMV3)
- Shaanxi SX2306 (HMV3)
- Shaanxi SX2150
- Shaanxi SX2190
- X6000 (2020–present)
- X5000 (2019–present)
- X3000 (2014–present)
- M3000 (2011–present)
- F3000 (2009–present)
- F2000 (2003–present)
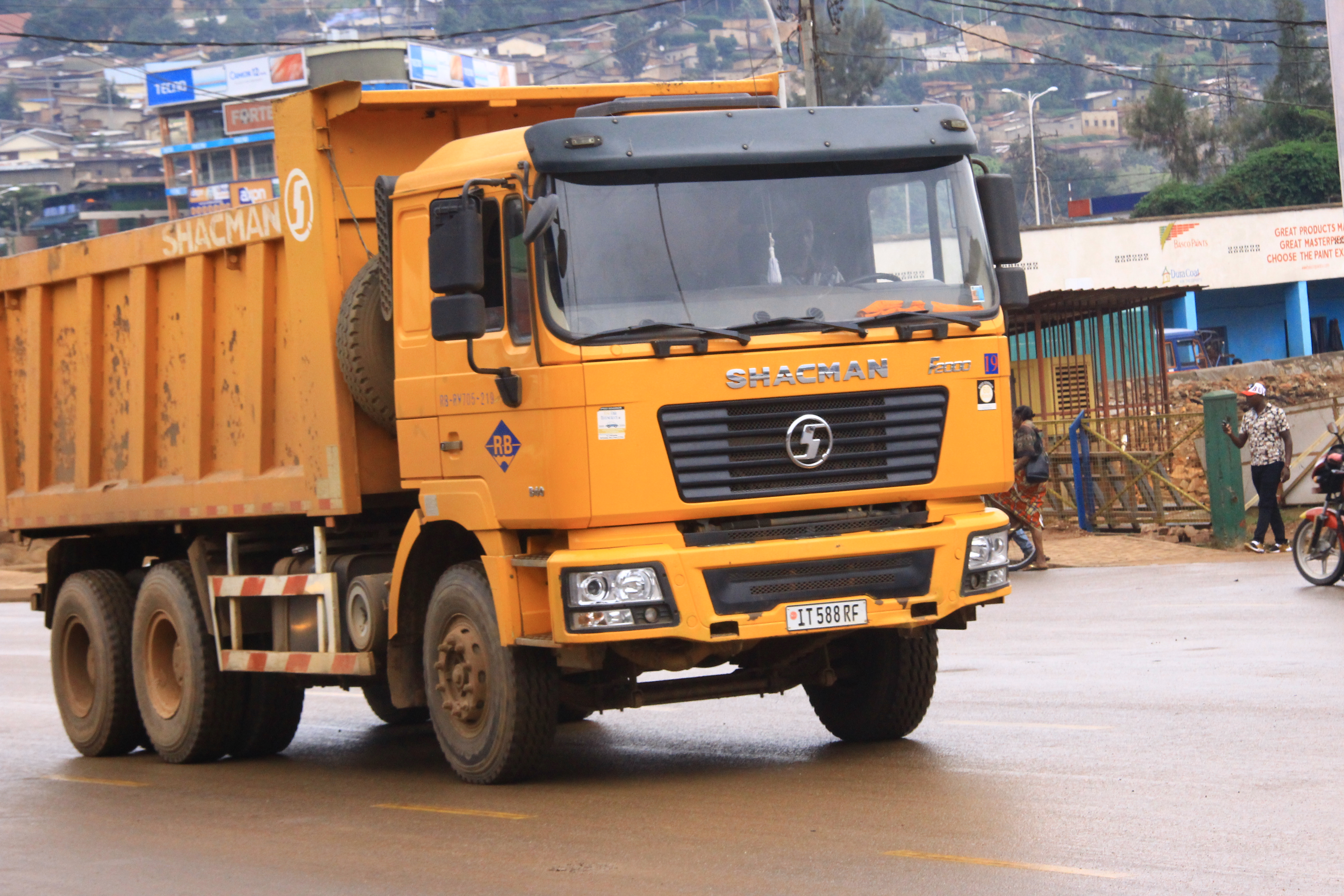
F2000 truck in Rwanda

=== Light Commercial Vehicles ===
- Delong G300 (德龙G300)
- Zhiyun S300 (智云S300)
- L6000e
- L3000
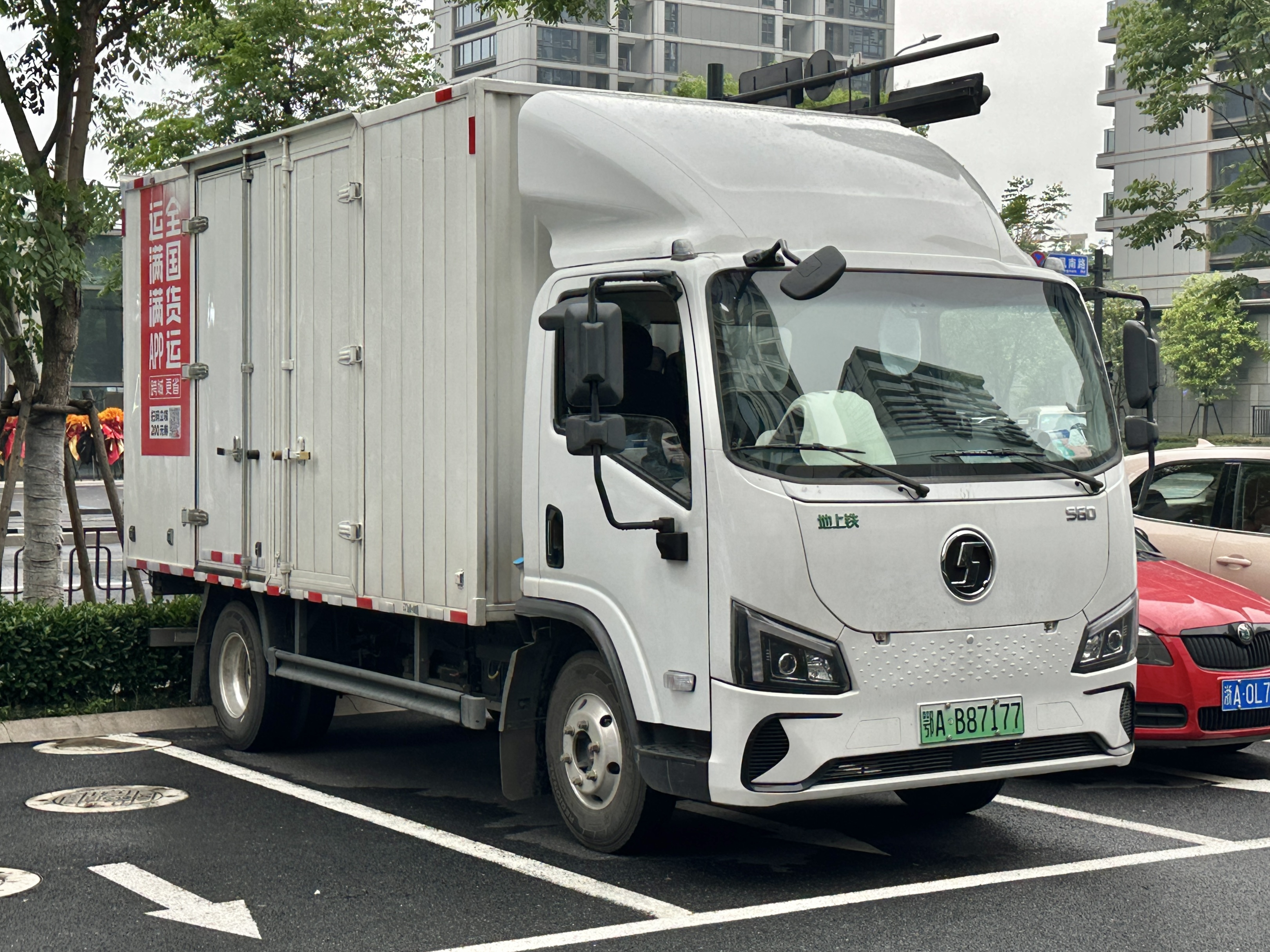
A Shacman Zhiyun S300

=== Construction Equipment ===
SX3555PV404C (off-road dump truck)

T5000e (terminal tractor)

== Shaanxi Tongjia Products ==
The light commercial vehicle products of Shaanxi Automobile Group are electric light commercial vehicles sold under the Shaanxi Tongjia brand.

- Shaanxi Tongjia Longrui
- Shaanxi Tongjia Fujia
- Shaanxi Tongjia Dianniu No.2
- Shaanxi Tongjia Dianniu No.3
- Shaanxi Tongjia Dianniu 3F
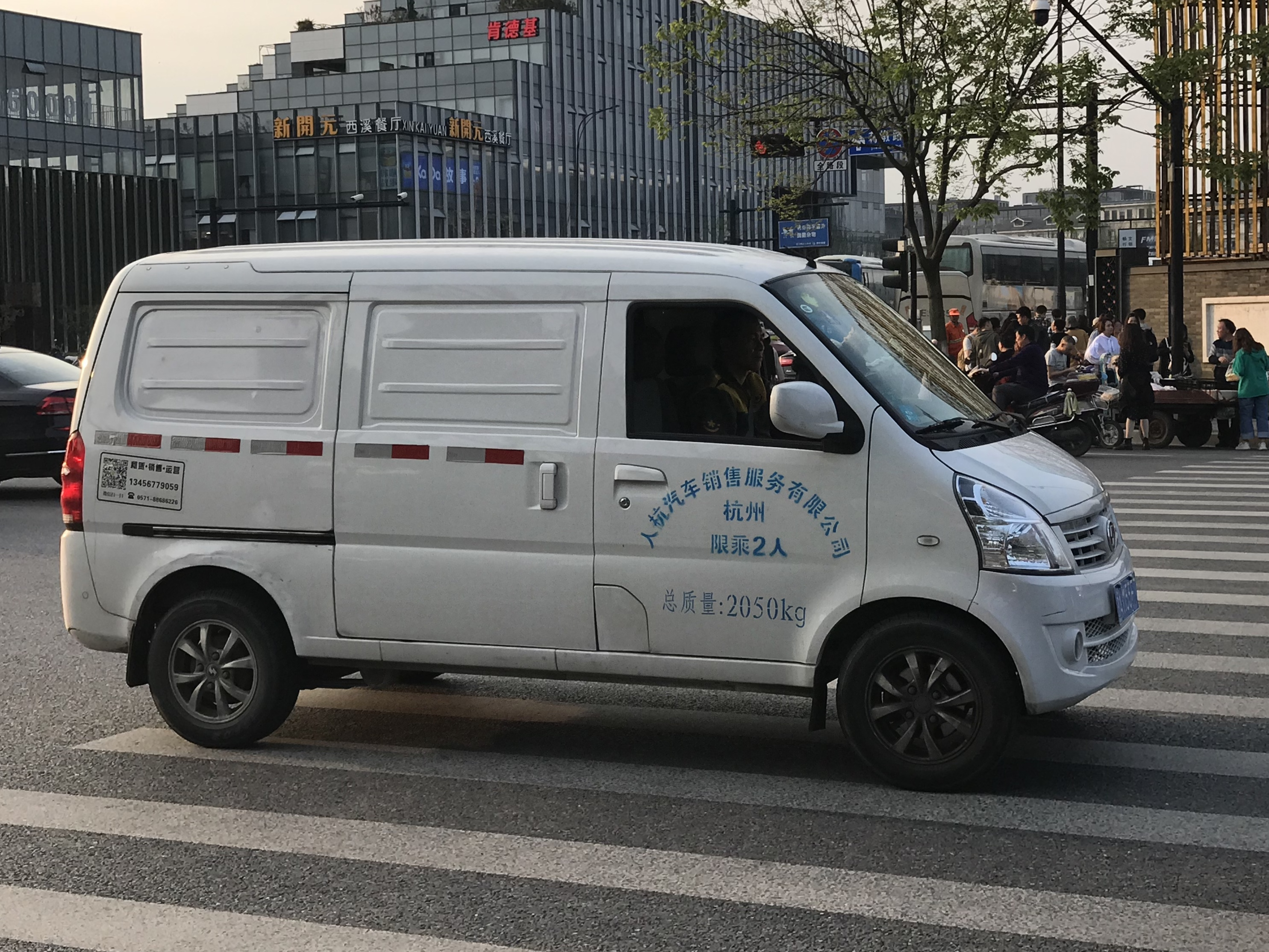
A Shaanxi Tongjia Fujia (Dianniu No.2)
