= Shaanxi Tongjia Fujia =

Chinese microvan

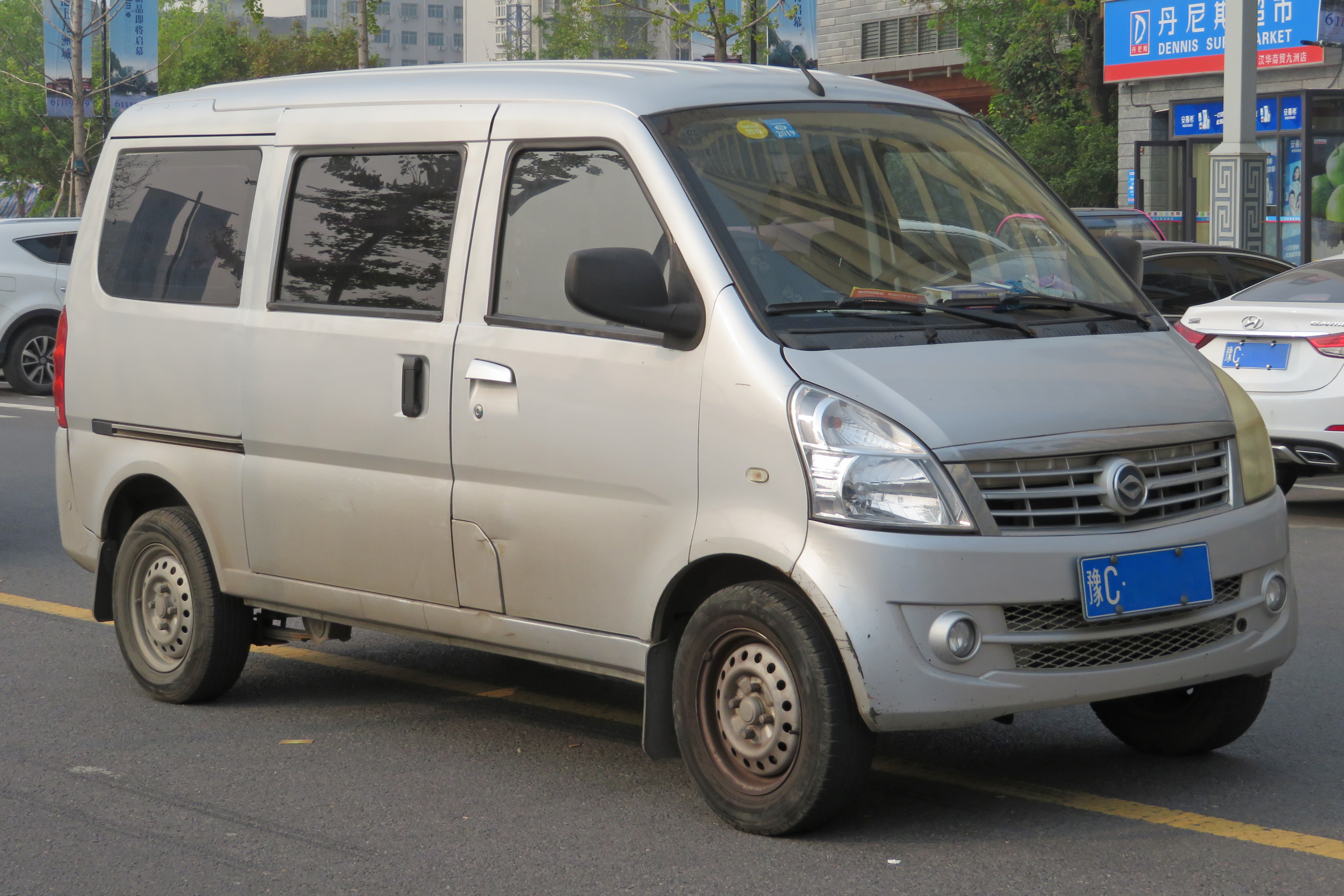
- 2012 Shaanxi-Tongjia Fujia STJ6400A

Overview
- Manufacturer: Shaanxi Automobile Group
- Also called: Shaanxi Tongjia Dianniu No.1; Shaanxi Tongjia Dianniu No.2
- Production: 2010–2022
- Model years: 2010–2022
- Assembly: Baoji, Shaanxi

Body and chassis
- Class: Microvan
- Body style: 5-door van
- Layout: Mid-engine, rear-wheel-drive

Powertrain
- Engine: 1.3 L LJ474Q3E2 I4 (petrol)
- Electric motor: 28 kW YS132HD15; 50 kW TZ204XSB50; 62 kW TZ185XSTJ017
- Transmission: 5-speed manual

Dimensions
- Wheelbase: 2,700 mm (106.3 in)
- Length: 4,030 mm (158.7 in)
- Width: 1,620 mm (63.8 in)
- Height: 1,900 mm (74.8 in)
- Curb weight: 1325kg (Dianniu No.1)

The Shaanxi Tongjia Fujia (Chinese: 陕汽通家 福家) is a microvan produced by Shaanxi Automobile Group under the Shaanxi Tongjia brand. The Shaanxi Tongjia brand was launched in 2009 as the light commercial vehicle branch of the Shaanxi Automobile Group.

== Overview ==
The Shaanxi Tongjia brand was launched in 2009 as the light commercial vehicle branch of the Shaanxi Automobile Group. It is the joint venture of Shaanxi Automobile Group, Shaanxi Aircraft Corporation, IAT Automobile Technology Co., Ltd. and Baoji Gaoxin Automotive Industry Development company.

The Shaanxi Tongjia Fujia was originally launched in 2010 in China with production starting on the 19th of September in 2010. As of October 27, 2015, the first variant of the Fujia for the logistics industry called the Dianniu No.1 was launched.

The Shaanxi Tongjia Fujia is a 5-door van available as a passenger van or a panel van and can seat from 5 to 7 occupants.

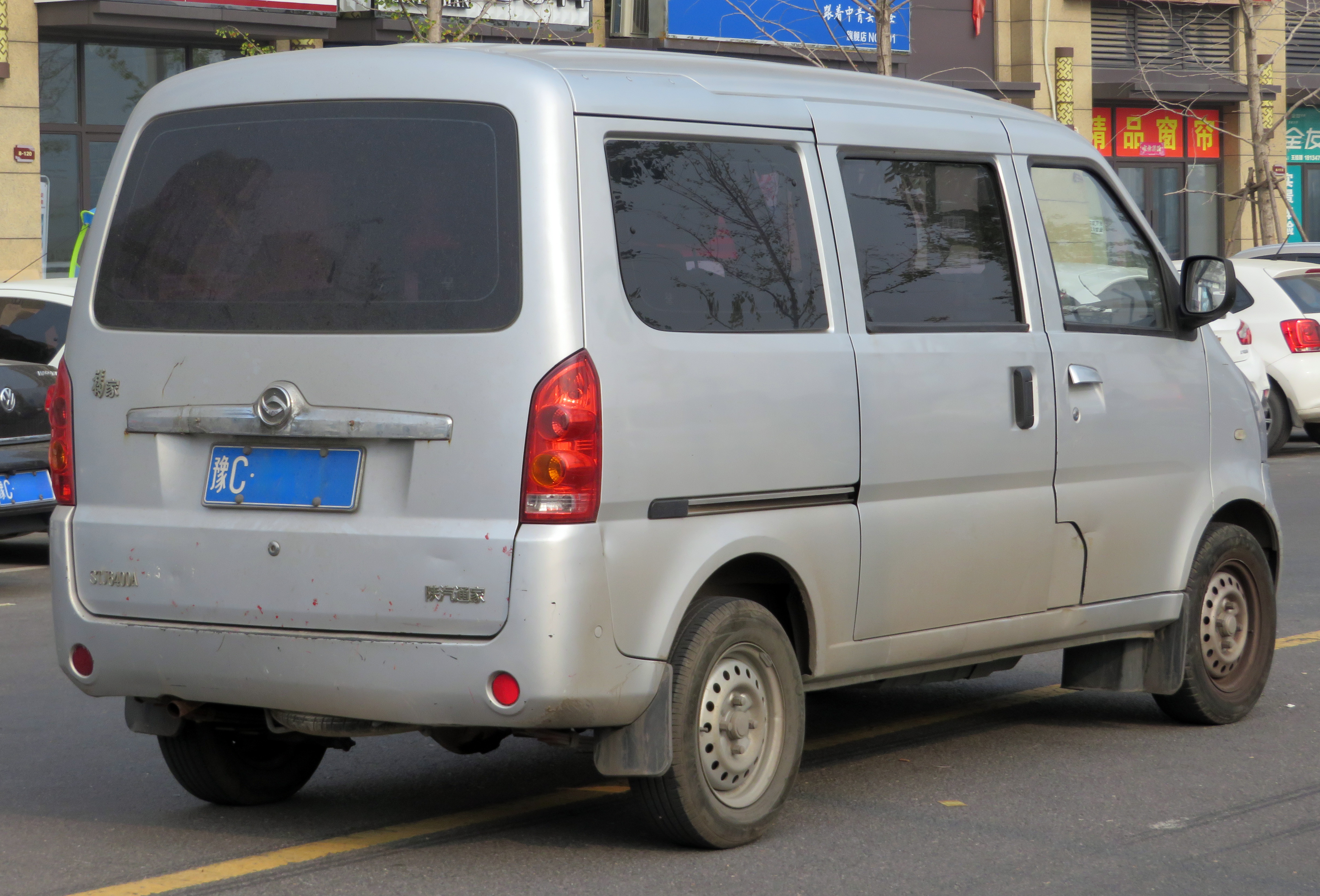
Rear view

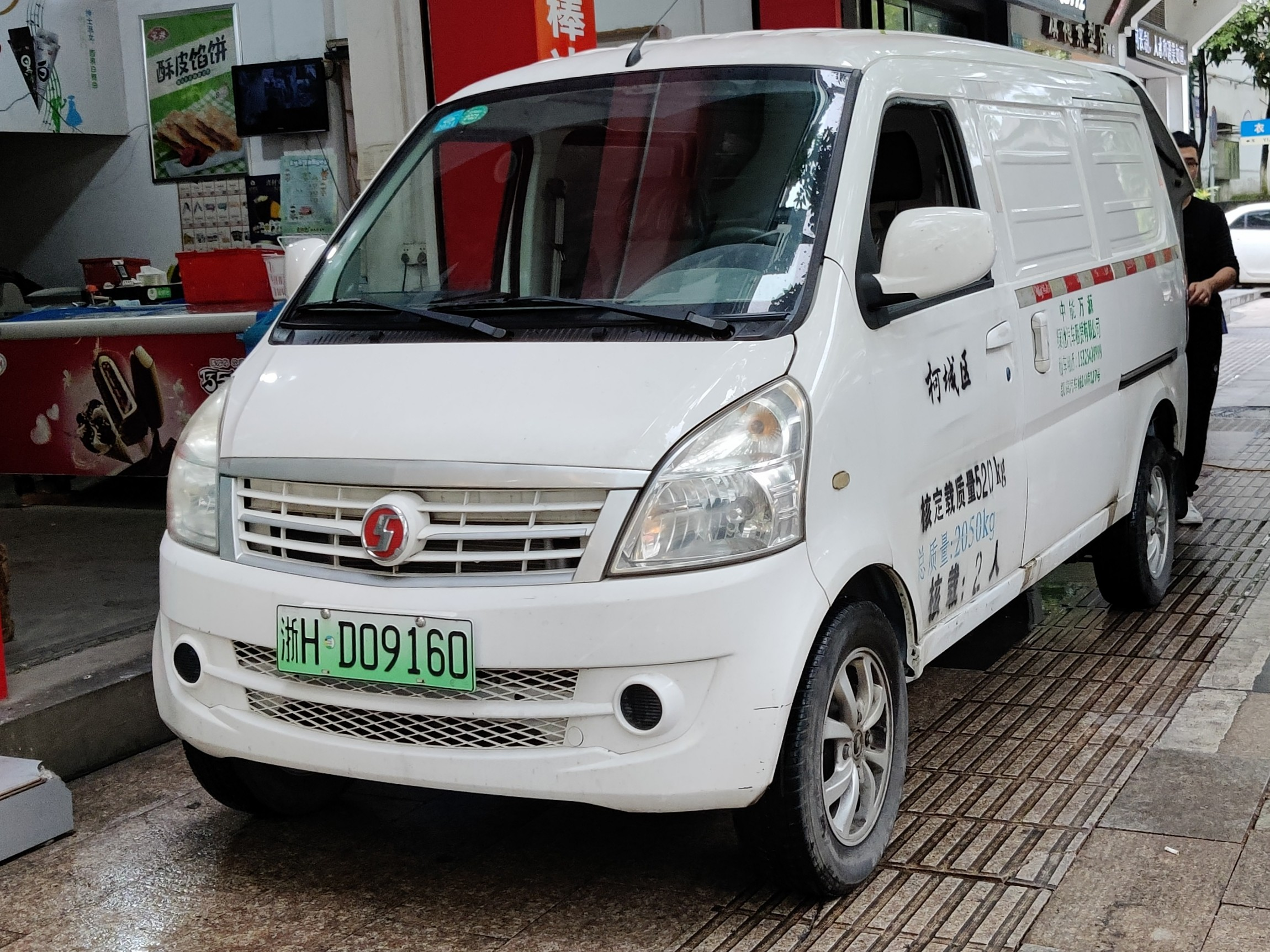
Shaanxi Tongjia Dianniu electric panel van

=== Powertrain ===
The Shaanxi Tongjia Fujia is powered by a 1.3-liter inline-4 16 valve fuel injection engine code named LJ474Q3E2 developing 83 hp (62 kW; 84 PS) mated to a 5-speed manual transmission. A 1.0-liter engine variant was also available.

=== Dianniu No.1/ No.2 ===
An electric panel van version is also available for the logistics industry in China. The Dianniu No.1 6-seater electric variant is powered by a 38 hp (28 kW; 39 PS) and 170 N⋅m (125 lb⋅ft) electric motor codenamed YS132HD15.

The Dianniu No.2 6-seater electric variant is powered by an 83 hp (62 kW; 84 PS) and 225 N⋅m (166 lb⋅ft) electric motor codenamed TZ185XSTJ017 and a 67 hp (50 kW; 68 PS) and 200 N⋅m (148 lb⋅ft) electric motor codenamed TZ204XSB50.
