= Heavy Expanded Mobility Tactical Truck =

US Army heavy tactical truck, in service since 1982

Heavy Expanded Mobility Tactical Truck (HEMTT)
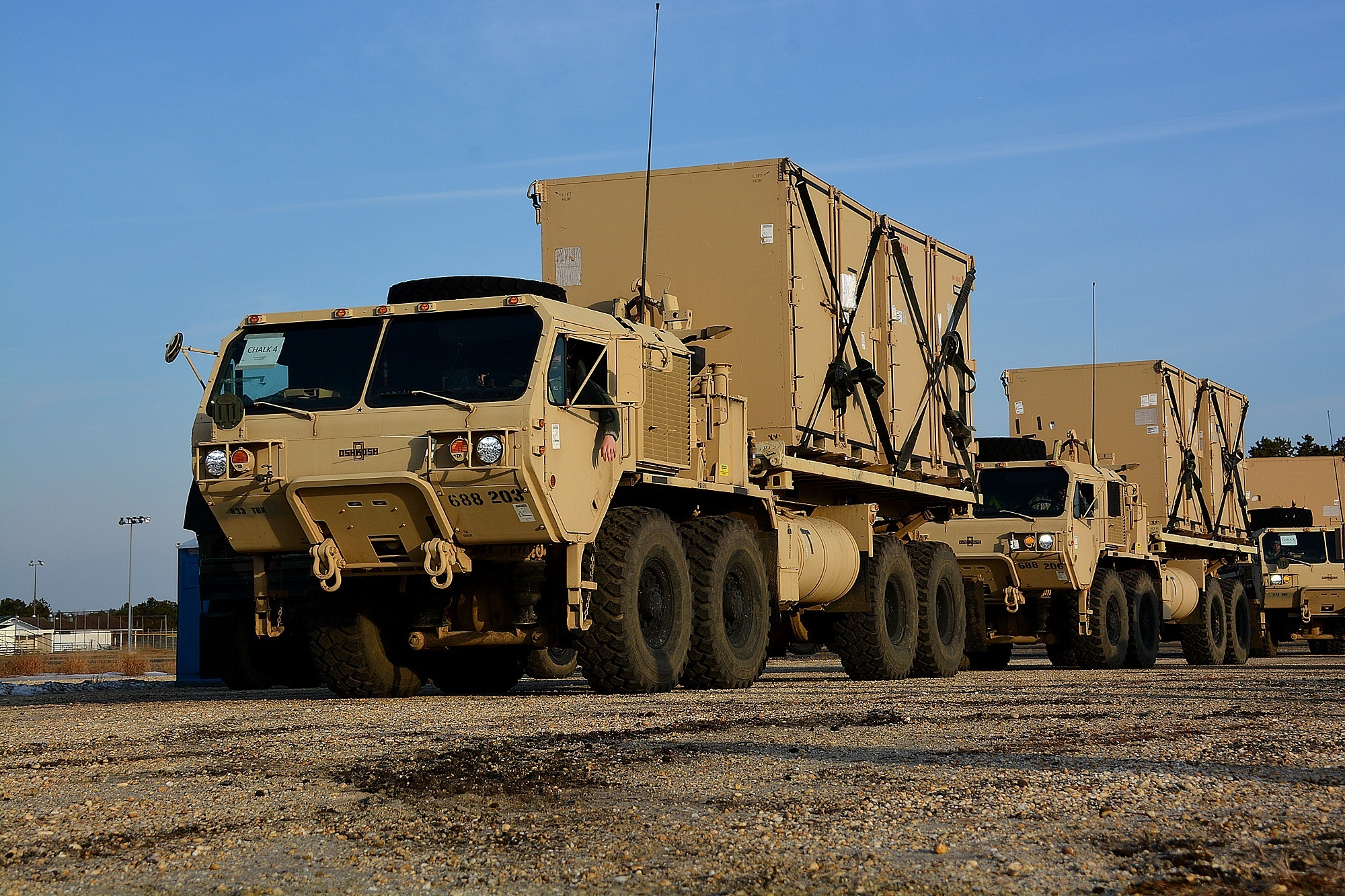
- HEMTT M1120A4 in B-kit configuration
- Type: 10-ton, 8×8, heavy tactical truck
- Place of origin: United States

Service history
- In service: 1982–present
- Used by: U.S. Army and others (see Operators)

Production history
- Designer: Oshkosh Corporation
- Designed: 1981
- Manufacturer: Oshkosh Corporation
- Produced: 1982–present
- No. built: 35,800 (new build)
- Variants: M977A0/A2/A4 cargo truck M977A0/A2/A4 Electrical Power Plant cargo truck (EPP); M978A0/A3/A4 tanker M983A0/A2/A4 tractor M983A2/A4 Light Equipment Transport tractor (LET); M984A0/A1/A2/A4 wrecker M985A0/A2/A4 cargo truck M985A0/A2/A4 Guided Missile Transporter cargo truck (GMT); M1120A2/A4 Load Handling System (LHS); M1142 Tactical Fire Fighting Truck (TFFT); M1158 water tender M1977A0/A2/A4 Common Bridge Transport (CBT); THAAD Missile Transporter erector launcher HEMTT A3 (ProPulse).

Specifications (M977A4)
- Mass: 42,500 lb (19,300 kg) unladen 69,000 lb (31,000 kg) laden (a-kit); 75,500 lb (34,200 kg) laden (b-kit); 109,000 lb (49,000 kg) (GCWR)
- Length: 34 ft 1 in; 10.4 m
- Width: 8 ft 0 in; 2.4 m
- Height: 9 ft 10 in; 3.0 m (over spare tire)
- Crew: 2
- Armor: U.S. Army Long Term Armor Strategy (LTAS) compliant; A-kit (integral) and B-kit (add-on armor appliqué)
- Engine: Caterpillar (CAT) C15, 15.2-liter, 6-cylinder inline water-cooled EPA 2004 compliant diesel 515 hp (384 kW)
- Payload capacity: rated at 10 short tons (9,100 kg)
- Transmission: Allison 4500SP 5-speed automatic with Oshkosh enhanced 55,000-pound (25,000 kg) 2 speed transfer case
- Suspension: Holland ADS-240 air (front); Holland AD-246 air (rear)
- Fuel capacity: 155 US gal (587 L)
- Operational range: 300 mi (483 km) loaded
- Maximum speed: 62 mph (100 km/h)
- Steering system: power-assisted on front tandem

The Heavy Expanded Mobility Tactical Truck (HEMTT) is an eight-wheel drive, diesel-powered, 10-short-ton (9,100 kg) tactical truck. The M977 HEMTT entered service in 1982 with the United States Army as a replacement for the M520 Goer, and has remained in production for the U.S. Army and other nations. By Q2 2021, around 35,800 HEMTTs in various configurations had been produced by Oshkosh Defense through new-build contracts and around 14,000 of them had been re-manufactured. Latest variants have the A4 suffix.

The 10×10 Logistic Vehicle System Replacement (LVSR) is the United States Marines Corps' (USMC) equivalent to the U.S. Army's 8×8 HEMTT and 10×10 Palletized Load System (PLS). The USMC does not use the HEMTT or PLS, and the Army does not use the LVSR, but both services use a common trailer (M1076) with all three truck types.

== History ==
Following the evaluation of proposals submitted by AM General, MAN, Pacific Car & Foundry (PACCAR) and Oshkosh Truck Corporation (with PACCAR–GMC team being the apparent leader of the competition, with pre-production assembly line already established) in May 1981, the then U.S. Army Tank-Automotive Command awarded an initial five-year contract valued at US$251.13 million to Oshkosh Truck Corporation for production of the 10-short-ton (9,100 kg) 8×8 Heavy Expanded Mobility Tactical Truck (HEMTT).

The first prototype HEMTT was completed in December 1981, pre-production examples followed during March 1982, with the first production vehicles produced in September 1982. Over five contract years, 2,140 vehicles were to be delivered. Contract options allowed for up to an additional 5,351 HEMTTs to be ordered, bringing production totals to 7,490 vehicles. The bulk of these options were exercised.

The second HEMTT contract was awarded to Oshkosh Truck Corporation in April 1987. This contract called for a base quantity of 1,403 vehicles, with options for an additional 1,684 vehicles; all contract options were exercised. A supplemental agreement added a further 1,449 vehicles (plus an option for 363 vehicles) to the second HEMTT contract in April 1989; the contract option was exercised. The third HEMTT production contract was awarded mid-1994 and when deliveries under this concluded over 14,000 HEMTTS had been produced. The fourth HEMTT production contract was awarded in August 1995, this extending production through September 2001.

The Family of Heavy Tactical Vehicles (FHTV) contract was awarded to Oshkosh by the U.S. Army in March 2001. In addition to the HEMTT (both new and re-manufacture), the contract covered the M1070 HET, M1074, and M1075 Palletized Load System (PLS) trucks, and M1076 PLS trailers and called for up to 5,398 trucks and 1,100 trailers (including options). FHTV covered the production period from March 2001 until mid-fiscal year 2006 (FY06). The FHTV contract was extended and renegotiated, and in February 2007, Oshkosh announced it had been awarded a contract to continue production of FHTVs. The follow-on FHTV contract (FHTV 2) covered new production of HEMTTs (including current A4 variants from mid-2008) and PLS vehicles plus PLS trailers. In total, 2,173 new-build HEMTT A4 and 104 Recap HEMTT A4 were ordered under FHTV 2.

Production of product-improved HEMTT A2s continued until production of the HEMTT A4 began in July 2008. The exception was the M1977, which initially remained at A2 configuration for fleet commonality reasons; there is now an M1977A4.

Oshkosh Defense announced in October 2008 that it had been awarded the FHTV 3 contract by the U.S. Army's TACOM. More than 6,000 vehicles and trailers could be delivered under this three-year contract. FHTV 3 covered the HEMTT A4 and A1 models of the PLS and HET, and both new and recapitalized (Recap) vehicles. HEMTT A4 models were required to be Long Term Armor Strategy (LTAS) compliant and came off the assembly line fitted with upgraded suspensions and integral composite (A-kit) armor, and ready to receive an add-on (B-kit) armor appliqué.

The first FHTV 3 order was valued at US$1.2 billion and delivery commenced in November 2008. By late-2009, about 11,500 HEMTT A4s (new-build and Recap) had been ordered under the FHTV 2 and 3 contracts.

Oshkosh Defense announced in 2012 that it had been awarded a bridge contract to continue production and support of the FHTV. In October 2013, the U.S. Army released a revised pre-solicitation notice associated with FHTV 4 (presented FHTV IV). The original synopsis had been released in July 2013. According to the October release, the government intends to award a five-year requirements contract with an estimated value of US$822 million on a sole source basis to Oshkosh Corporation. It is understood the aim of the U.S. Army, was to ensure negotiations with Oshkosh Defense for FHTV IV were concluded in time to ensure there was no break in production between FHTV 3 and FHTV IV production and deliveries.

On 19 June 2015, Oshkosh Defense announced the U.S. Army had awarded the company a five-year requirements contract worth a potential $780 million to Recapitalize (Recap) its Family of Heavy Tactical Vehicles (FHTV). The FHTV 4 contract covers an estimated 1,800 FHTVs and in addition to HEMTTs covers PLS trucks and also includes the production of approximately 1,000 new production PLS trailers. HEMTT models account for around 75 per cent of the Recap potential, and all work performed under the contract will be completed in Oshkosh, Wisconsin. Deliveries will run from 2015 to 2019.

In March 2016, Oshkosh received FHTV 4 awards valued at $430 million and covering the Recap of 1212 HEMTTs and PLS, plus the production of 345 new-build PLS trailers. Deliveries are slated for 2016–2017.

In April 2017, Oshkosh announced further FHTV 4 awards valued at more than $258 million for the Recap of 670 FHTVs plus the production of 356 PLS trailers. Deliveries commence in December 2017.

On 23 May 2018, Oshkosh announced a further FHTV-4 award, this valued at $235.2 million for the Recap of 410 FHTVs and the manufacture of 680 new PLS trailers. Deliveries commence in FY19.

On 8 February 2019, Oshkosh announced an FHTV-4 award valued at $225.7 million for the Recap of 407 FHTVs and the manufacture of 601 new PLS trailers. Deliveries commence in FY19.

The final FHTV 4 award was announced by Oshkosh in March 2020. The award was valued at US$346.4 million and called for an undisclosed quantity of U.S. Army and U.S Army Reserve FHTVs to be Recap’d. Quantities/breakdown were not revealed, and deliveries were scheduled to conclude in December 2021.

On 3 May 2021 the U.S. Army announced that it had awarded Oshkosh Defense a three-year extension to the FHTV 4 contract. Under the extension, Oshkosh will provide new and Recap'd HEMTT, PLS trucks and trailers, and HETs. The initial delivery orders call for a total of 353 new and recapitalized vehicles, with HEMTTs accounting for US$130.5 million (inc. 33.8 million for M1977A4 CBTs) of the US$146.8 million total.

Used vehicles can be returned to Oshkosh as part of a recapitalization program where they are stripped to their frame rails and then fully rebuilt to a zero-hour, zero-mile, like-new condition. Recapitalized vehicles are assembled on the same production line as new vehicles, and put through the same performance tests and inspection procedures as new vehicles. Recapitalized vehicles are returned to the Army with a new bumper-to-bumper warranty and include air-conditioned and armor-ready cabs; electrical upgrades, and an anti-lock braking system.

=== Common Tactical Truck (CTT); previously Next Generation Future Truck (NGFT) ===
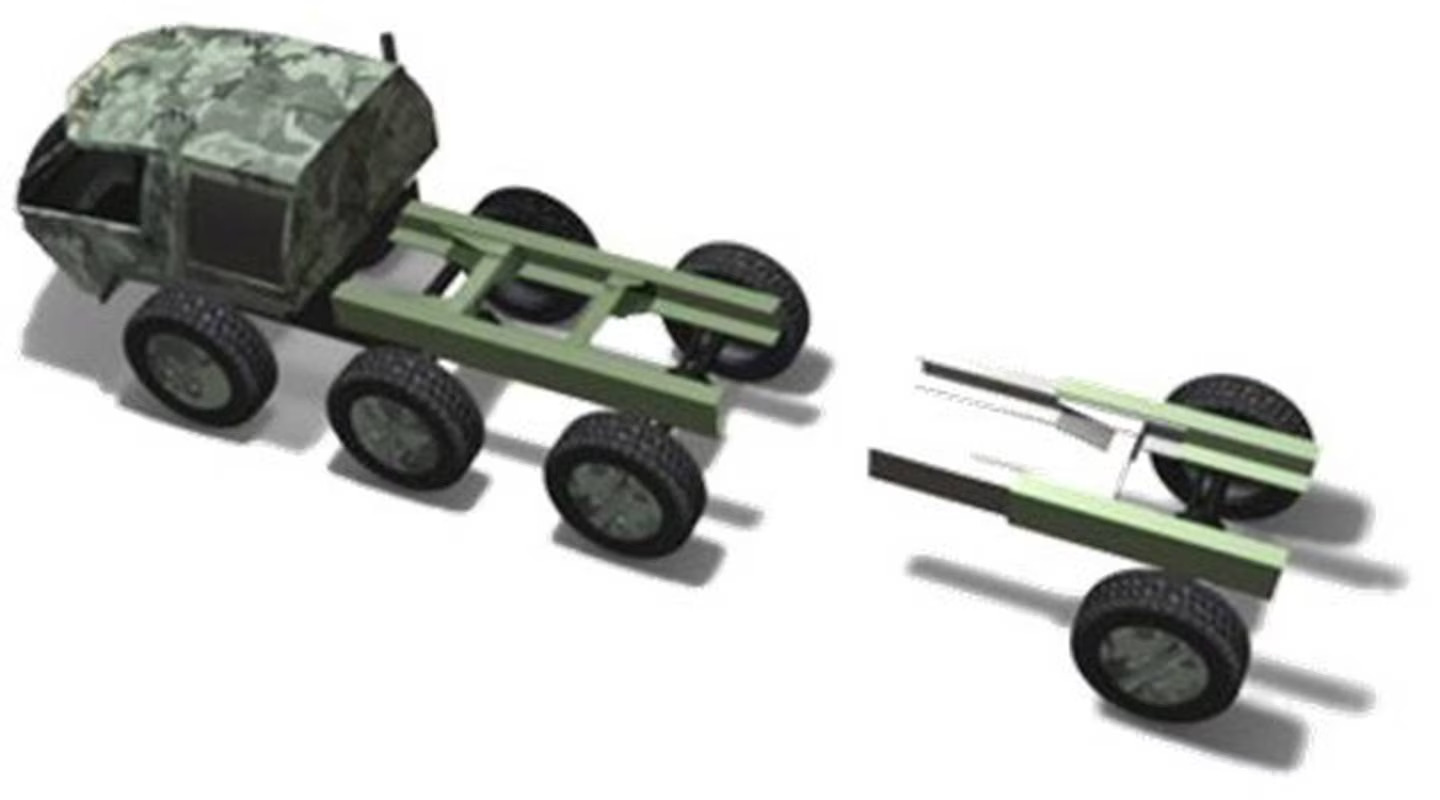
Common Tactical Truck rendering

Parallel to the FHTV 4 extension effort, the U.S. Army's Heavy Tactical Vehicles (HTV) PEO CS&CSS issued on 20 July 2020 Notice ID W56HZV-20-R-0237, a Request for Information (RfI) for the Next Generation Future Truck (NGFT). Responses were due by 24 August 2020 for what was quickly renamed the Common Tactical Truck (CTT). It is the intent that CTT will replace the HEMTT, plus the PLSA1 and M915 Truck Tractor, Line Haul. The Army desires five variants of the NGFT/CTT, and all with the option to perform semi-autonomous or autonomous operations. The five variants currently mooted are: a wrecker to recover Stryker, MRAPs, and other tactical wheeled vehicles up to 40 US tons; an LHS Heavy variant with crane to transport flatrack with up to 16 tons of cargo payload; a Tractor variant operable with the M870, M871, M172, M872, M967 tanker, M1062 tanker, future tanker (8,200 gallons), and commercial standard trailers; a Tanker variant with a 2,500 gallon threshold or objective fuel payload greater than 2,500 gallons; and a Cargo variant with crane capable of carrying a payload of up to 22 tons or greater.

== Description ==
The HEMTT's objective is to provide heavy transport capabilities for supply and re-supply of combat vehicles and weapons systems. Compared to earlier generation 5-ton trucks in U.S. Army service it offers increased payload and mobility. The HEMTT is available in a variety of configurations, including cargo, tanker, tractor and wrecker.

The HEMTT was developed from the outset as a tactical truck, but to minimize procurement and life cycle costs included militarized commercial automotive components where possible, these including the engine and transmission. Some components used in early HEMTTs are common with the Oshkosh Logistics Vehicle System (LVS) vehicles which were supplied to the U.S. Marine Corps.

With the exception of the M984 wrecker variant (254 × 89 × 9.5 mm, front; 356 × 89 × 9.5 mm, rear), on all HEMTT variants the chassis is formed of 257 × 89 × 9.5 mm heat-treated carbon manganese steel with a yield strength of 758 MPa. Bolted construction with Grade 8 bolts is used throughout. A centrally mounted self-recovery winch is an option and this is fitted to around 20% of production.

The HEMTT's two-door forward control cab seats two. It is of heavy-duty welded steel construction with corrosion-resistant sheet metal skins. Simula Inc. (acquired by Armor Holdings in 2003 and now BAE Systems) supplied 186 add-on cab armoring kits for use in the former Yugoslavia. These were not issued, but from 2004 were used in Iraq. BAE systems supplied a next-generation armor kit for the HEMTT and by late-2006 had supplied the U.S. Army with around 3600 kits for the Oshkosh HEMTT and PLS. The HEMTT A4 is fitted with the slightly larger from the Oshkosh PLS A1. This cab complies with the U.S. Army's Long Term Armor Strategy (LTAS) requirements of an A- and B-kit armoring philosophy. It also comes as standard with integrated floor armor, an integrated mount for a machine gun and gunner protection kit, and air-conditioning.

A Detroit Diesel 8V92TA V-8 two-stroke diesel developing 445 hp (332 kW) is fitted in HEMTT A0 and A1 models, with the DDECIV version of this engine fitted to A2 HEMTTs. An EPA 2004 compliant Caterpillar (CAT) C-15 six-cylinder, 15.2-liter diesel developing a peak of 515 hp (384 kW) is fitted to HEMTT A4 models. HEMTT A0 and A1 models are fitted with an Allison HT 740D 4F/1R automatic transmission, torque converter, and Oshkosh 55,000-pound (25,000 kg) two-speed transfer case. HEMTT A2 models have the Allison HD 4560P 6F/1R automatic transmission. HEMTT A4 models are fitted with an Allison 4500SP 5F/1R automatic transmission and an uprated version of Oshkosh's 55,000-pound (25,000 kg) two-speed transfer case.

The front axles on all HEMTTs are single-reduction Oshkosh 46K, the rear are Dana single-reduction which vary according to configuration. Drive to the front axles is selectable and all axles have differential locks. Suspension on A0/A1/A3 models is by Hendrickson leaf springs with equalizing beams. Suspension on A4 models is Holland air suspension, load rating on the rear axles varying by configuration. Tire size is 1600 R20 on all models, and standard tire fit is Michelin XZL.

All models are capable of fording water crossings up to 48 in (120 cm) deep, and can climb a gradient of at least 60%. All original variants are air transportable in the C-130. All variants are air-transportable in the C-17.

Original HEMTT models now have the suffix A0. Only the M984 wrecker was produced in A1 configuration. All models were produced in A2 configuration. The A3 suffix is applied to HEMTT technology demonstrators with a diesel–electric drive system. Current HEMTT production models have the suffix A4.

== HEMTT models ==
- The M977 cargo truck variant is the base member of the HEMTT family. The current model is the M977A4; there was no M977A1. In addition to the basic M977A0/A2/A4 cargo truck, two other variants are available. The M977A0/A2/A4 Electrical Power Plant (EPP) has an extended cargo body (6.041 m (19.82 ft) inside length) and is used to hold and transport generators for the Patriot air-defence missile system. There is no material handling crane on the EPP. The M977A0/A2/A4 Large Repair Parts Transporter (LRPT) and the basic M977 cargo truck are fitted with a light-duty Grove materials handling crane mounted at the rear of the chassis.
- The M978 is a 9,500 liter capacity tanker. The current model is the M978A4; there was no M978A1. The M978A0 was produced in both potable water (approximately 18) and fuel servicing truck variants, the A2 and A4 models have only been produced in the fuel servicing truck variant.
- The M983 is a tractor unit for use with the trailer-mounted MIM-104 Patriot missile system. It can also be used with the Interim Stryker Recovery System, or other trailers. An earlier variant fitted with a 30 kW generator and crane mounted behind the cab was used to tow the Pershing II Erector Launcher in CONUS (a M1001 MAN tractor was used in West Germany). The M983A2/A4 Light Equipment Transporter (LET) tractor is mainly used to transport construction and engineer equipment. It has a 45,000 lb (20,000 kg)) 2 speed hydraulic winch mounted behind the cab used to load the trailer. It does not have a self-recovery winch.
- The M984 wrecker is the only HEMTT variant to have been produced in the A1 configuration, and this resulting in the change of recovery crane and retrieval system between A0 and A1 configurations. The current model is the M984A4. Standard equipment includes a 27,240 kg (60,050 lb) capacity two-speed recovery winch, a rear-mounted 11,340 kg capacity vehicle retrieval system, and a 6,350 kg (14,000 lb) at 2.74 m (9.0 ft) capacity Grove materials handling crane. A 9,072 kg (20,000 lb) bare drum capacity self-recovery winch is fitted as standard on the M984.
- The M985 is available in two variants. The current models are A4; there were no A1 models. The M985 cargo variant is similar to the M977 cargo truck but was developed to support the M270 Multiple Launch Rocket System (MLRS) with a M989A1 HEMAT trailer. It may also be used to transport Patriot missiles. The M985 Guided Missile Transporter (GMT) was developed specifically for use with the Patriot system and it can be distinguished easily from other cargo models by its rear-mounted Hiab 8108/2 materials handling crane
- The M1120 Load Handling System (LHS) variant was initially introduced as part of the HEMTT overhaul/rebuild program, during which returned M977 cargo trucks have their cargo bodies and materials handling cranes removed, to be replaced by a Multilift Mark 5 (now designated MPH165-LHS) LHS, as fitted to the Oshkosh PLS truck.
- The M1977 HEMTT Common Bridge Transporter (CBT) is a further development of the M1120 LHS, and in common with the M1120 LHS was initially introduced as part of the HEMTT overhaul/rebuild program. It is used for loading, transporting, and unloading Ribbon Bridge components and bridge erection boats.
- The M1142 is a Tactical Fire Fighting Truck (TFFT) capable of extinguishing aircraft, petroleum, brush, and structural fires at isolated military installations. The TFFT is based on a HEMTT M977A2 chassis with the heavier duty M1120 LHS HEMTT variant rear suspension. The TFFT contract was awarded to Pierce Manufacturing with Oshkosh Corporation as a subcontractor to Pierce.
- The M1158 HEWATT is designed to support the M1142 Tactical Fire Fighting Truck (TFFT) while providing supplementary fire suppression capabilities.
- The HEMTT-based M1075 Terminal (formerly Theatre) High Altitude Area Defense (THAAD) missile launcher is technically a variant of the HEMTT LHS, but as of November 2016 no technical details had been released.
- The HEMTT A3 is the first production-ready tactical defense vehicle to feature a diesel–electric drive system. The ProPulse system fitted uses a modular series-hybrid arrangement to simplify the transmission of power to the wheels. The diesel engine powers an electric generator, which provides direct power to the wheels, eliminating the torque converter, automatic transmission, transfer case, and drive shafts. A dedicated motor controlled from its own power converters drives each axle independently. ProPulse technology, it is claimed, can increase fuel economy by up to 40% over conventional powertrains. The diesel engine is optimized to run at the most efficient speed based on power demand, and transient loads to the engine are eliminated using stored energy. This eliminates the inefficiency associated with changing rpm levels during acceleration and deceleration, and also reduces emissions. In stopping operations, the electric motors operate as generators, and energy is stored for use in the next acceleration. Other stated advantages of the system include the system acting as an on-board generator, providing enough electricity (up to 200 kW of AC power) to power a small airfield, hospital, or military command center. Since the system uses no batteries, they never need to be replaced, and the amount of fuel needed to supply ProPulse-equipped trucks will be less.

== Gallery ==
Heavy Expanded Mobility Tactical Truck (HEMTT)

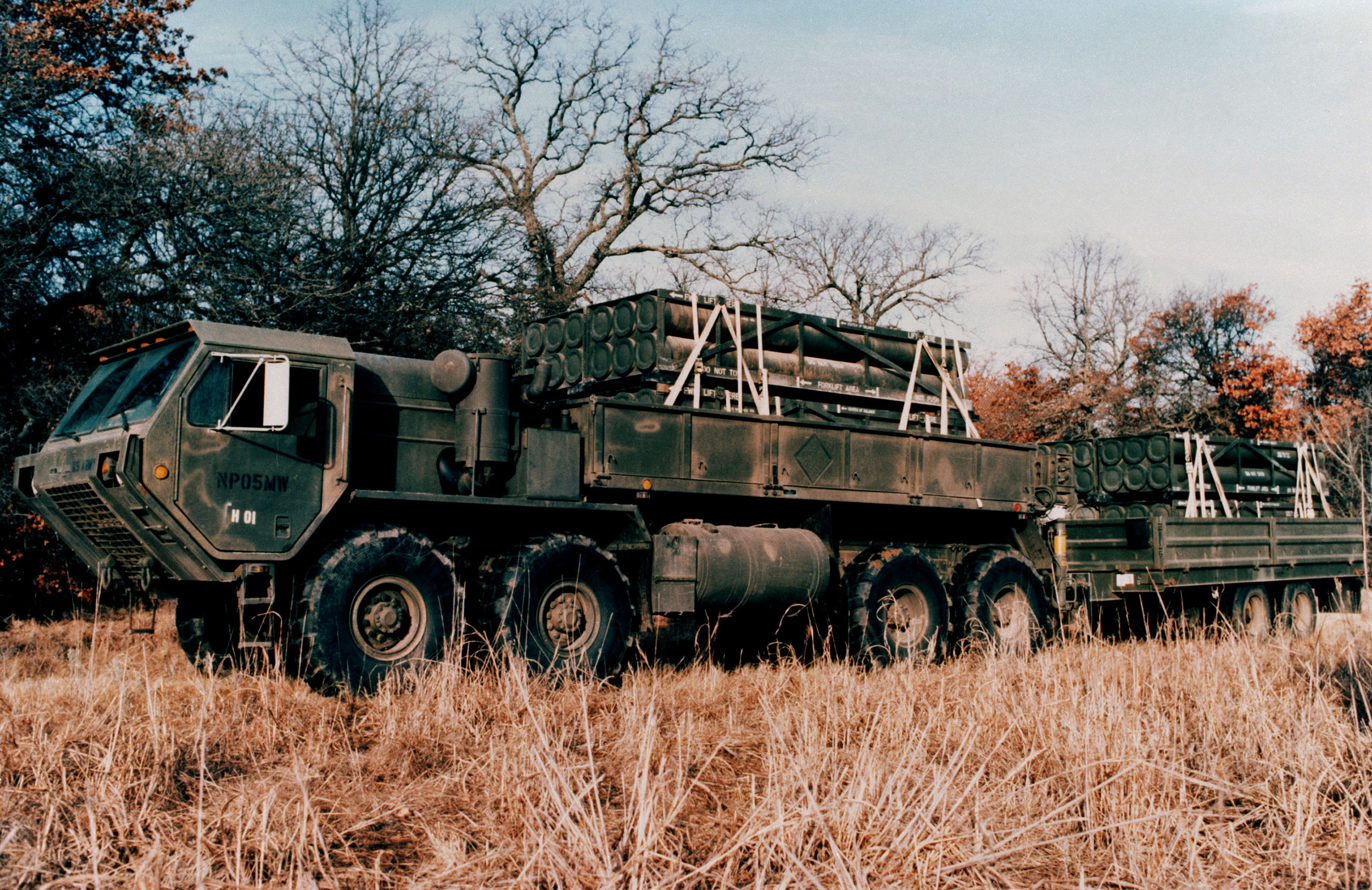
An early promotional image of a M977 HEMTT and trailer; payload are MLRS reloads

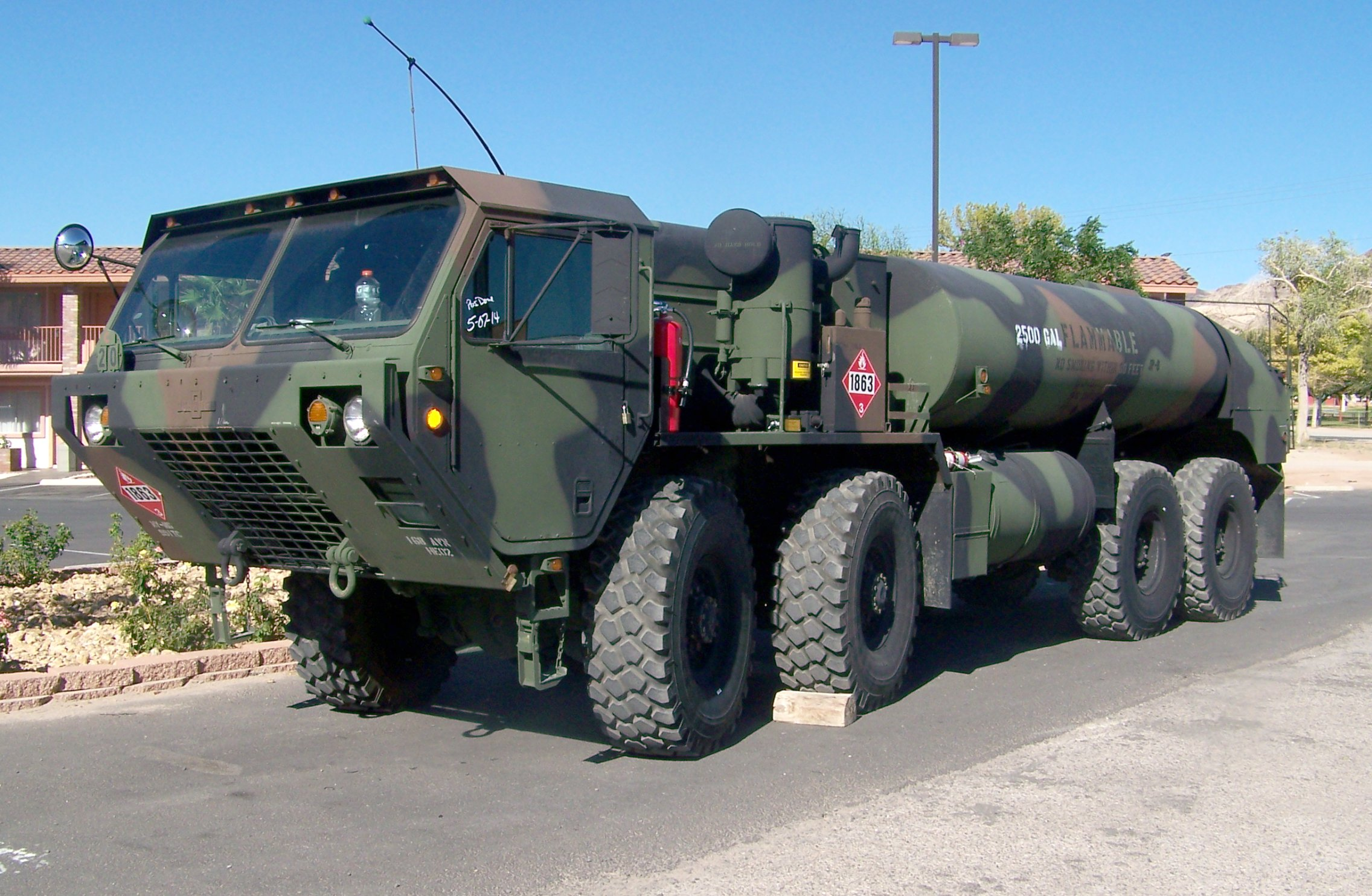
HEMTT M978A2 9,500-liter (2,500 U.S. gal) capacity fuel tanker with standard unarmored cab

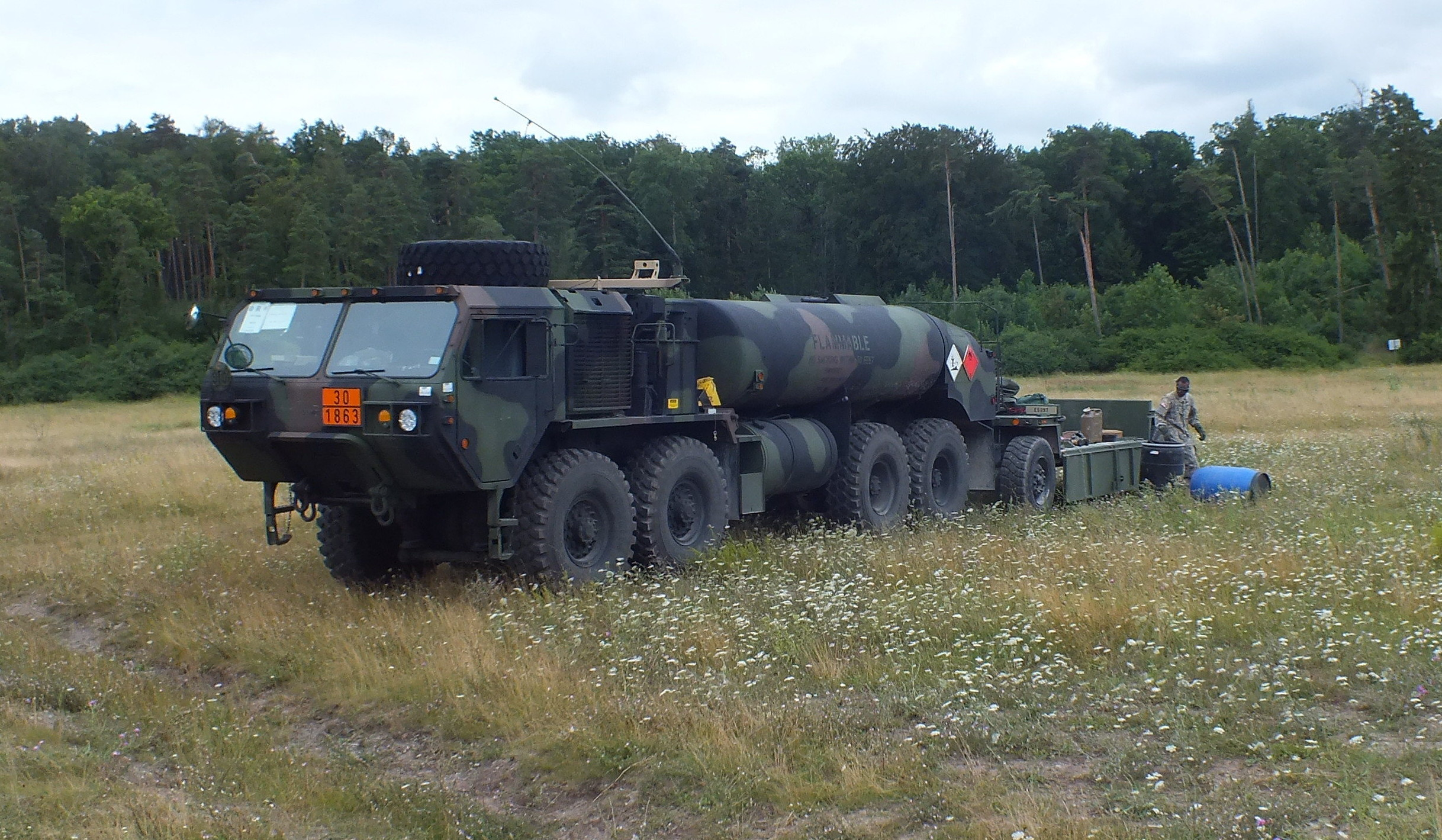
HEMTT M978A4 9,500-liter (2,500 U.S. gal) capacity fuel tanker with M989 HEMAT trailer

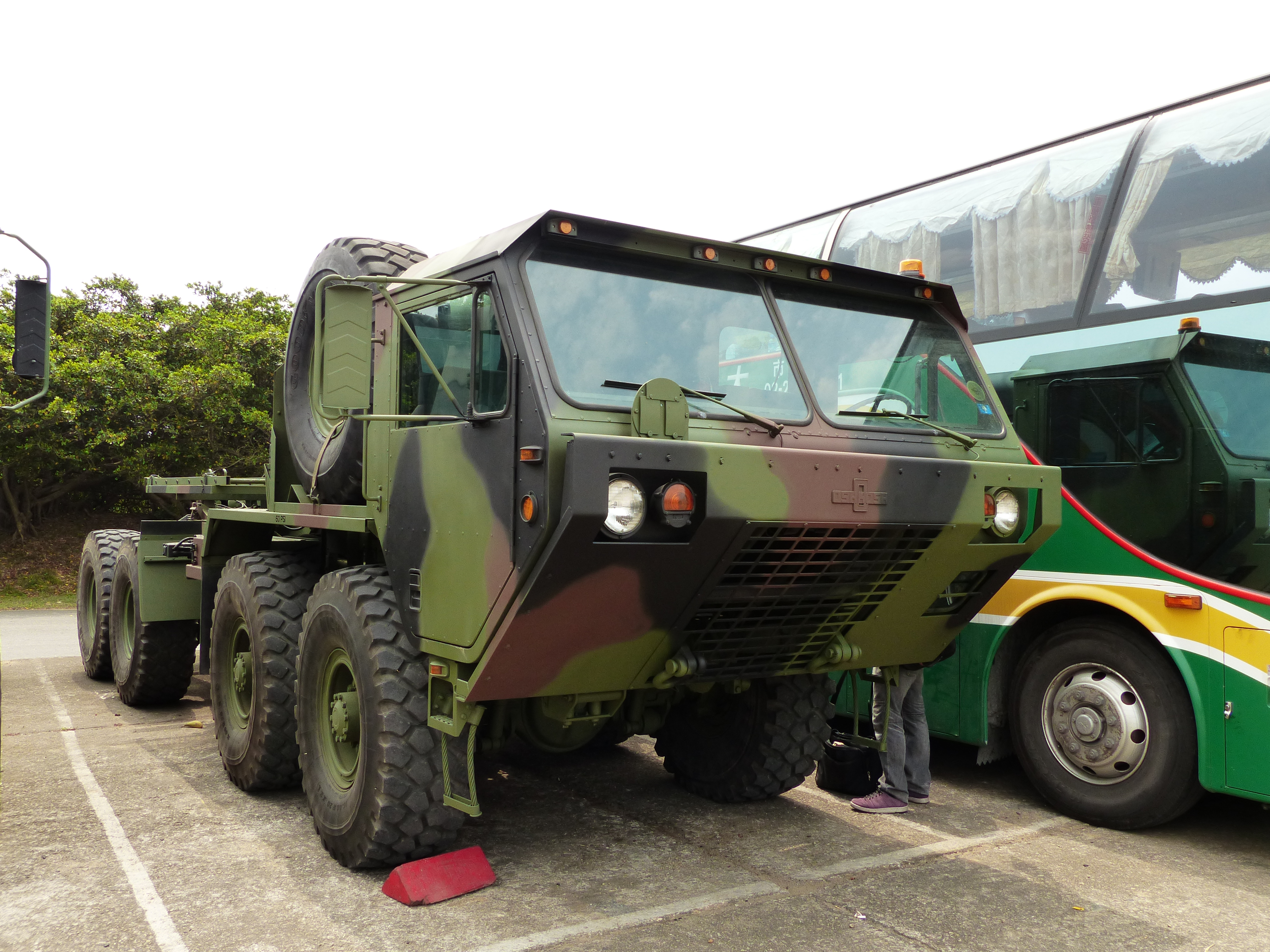
HEMTT M983A2 of Taiwan's armed forces

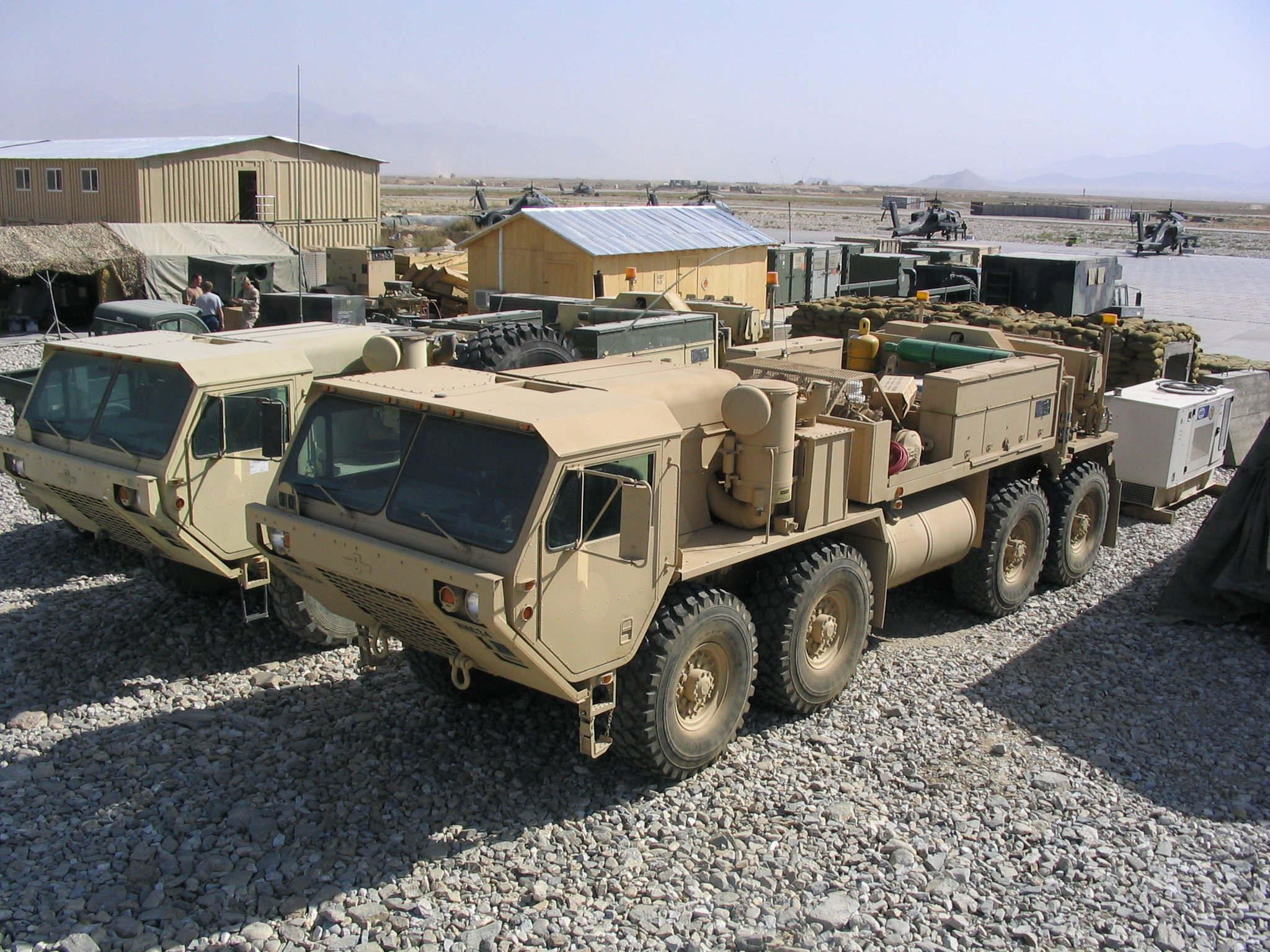
HEMTT M984A2 wreckers with standard unarmored cab

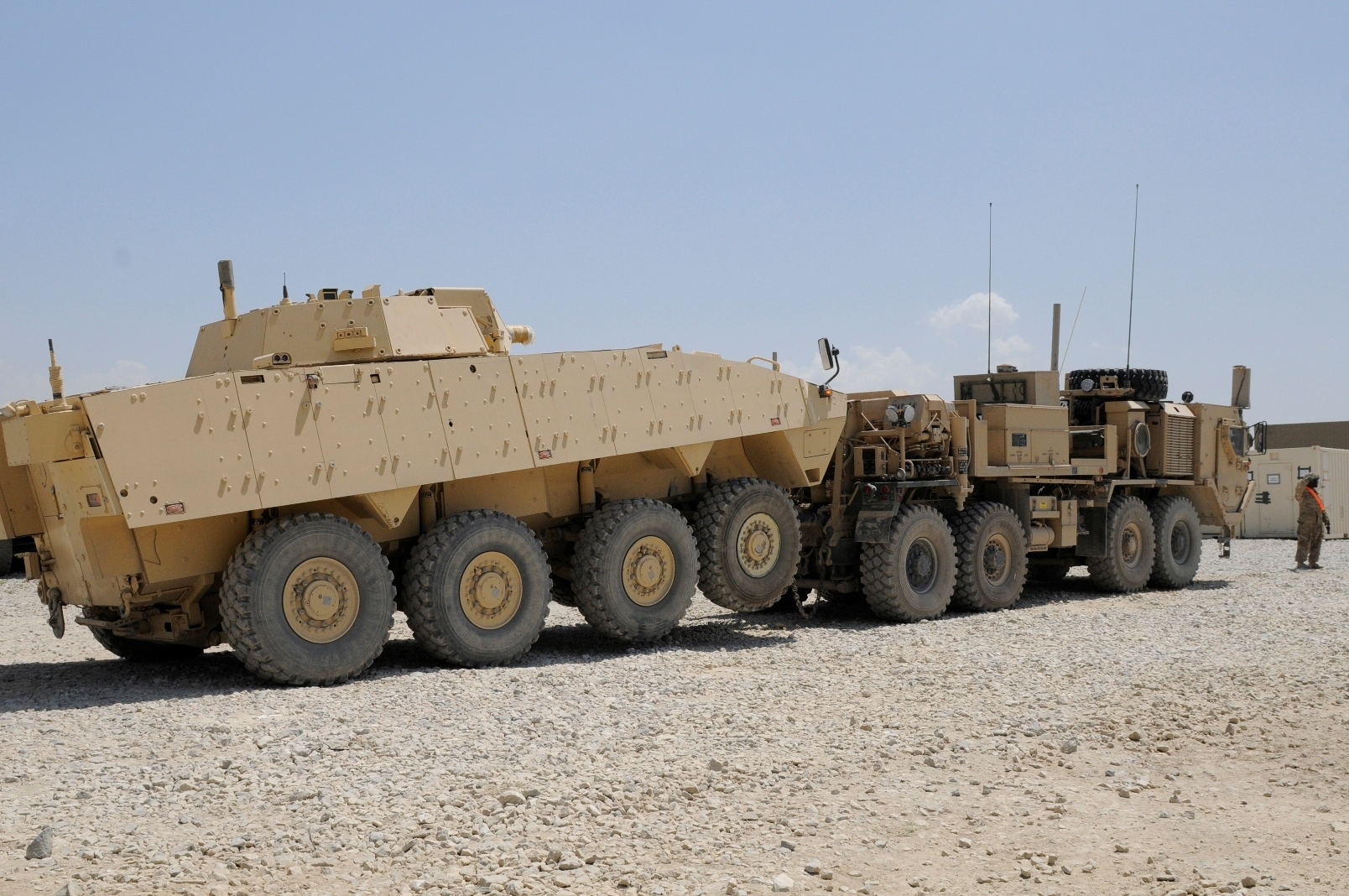
HEMTT M984A4 wrecker with armored cab

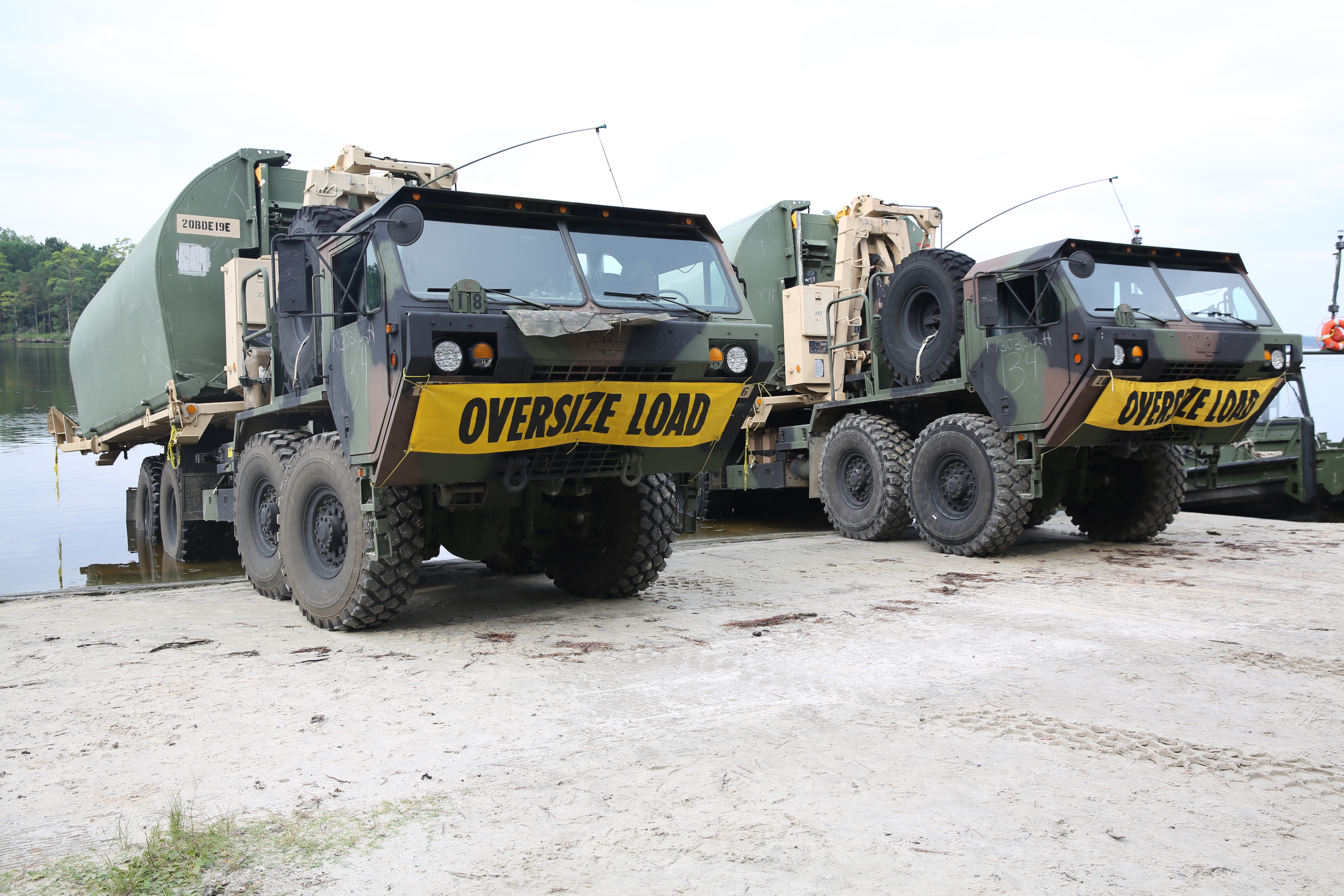
HEMTT M1977A2 CBTs with standard unarmored cab

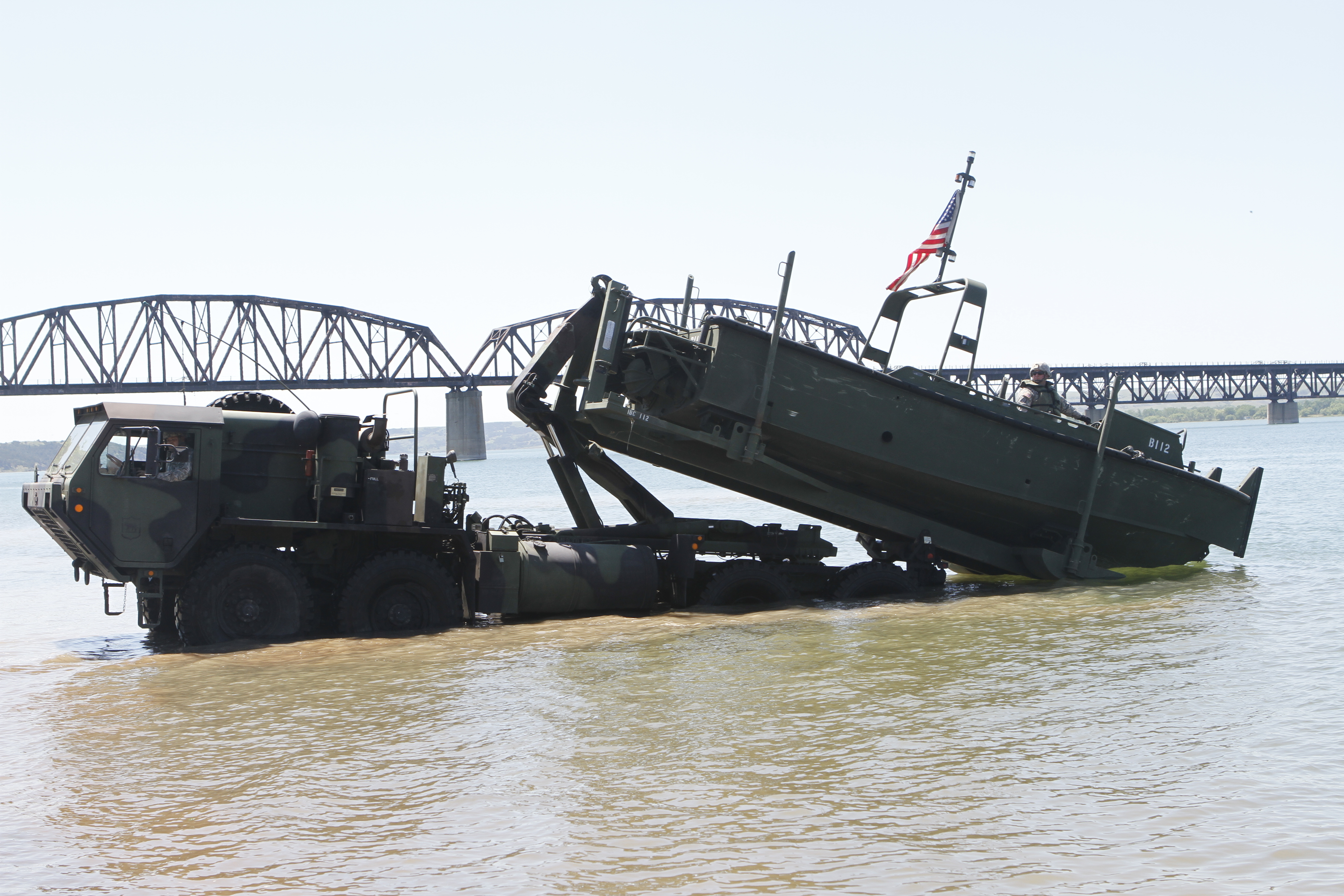
U.S. Army soldiers unload a Mk2 Bridge Erection Boat from a M1977A2 CBT HEMTT into the Missouri River

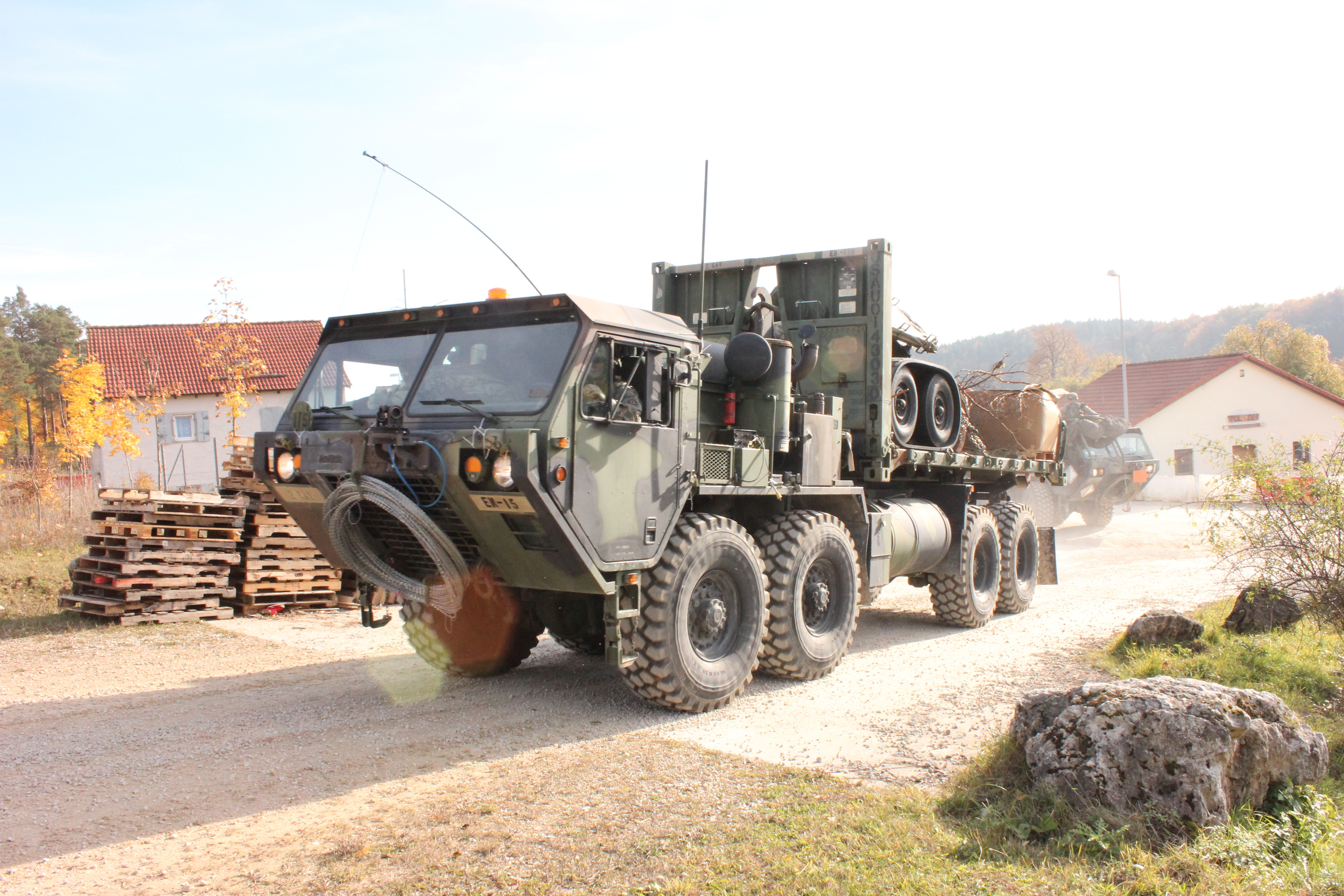
HEMTT M1120A2 with standard softskin cab

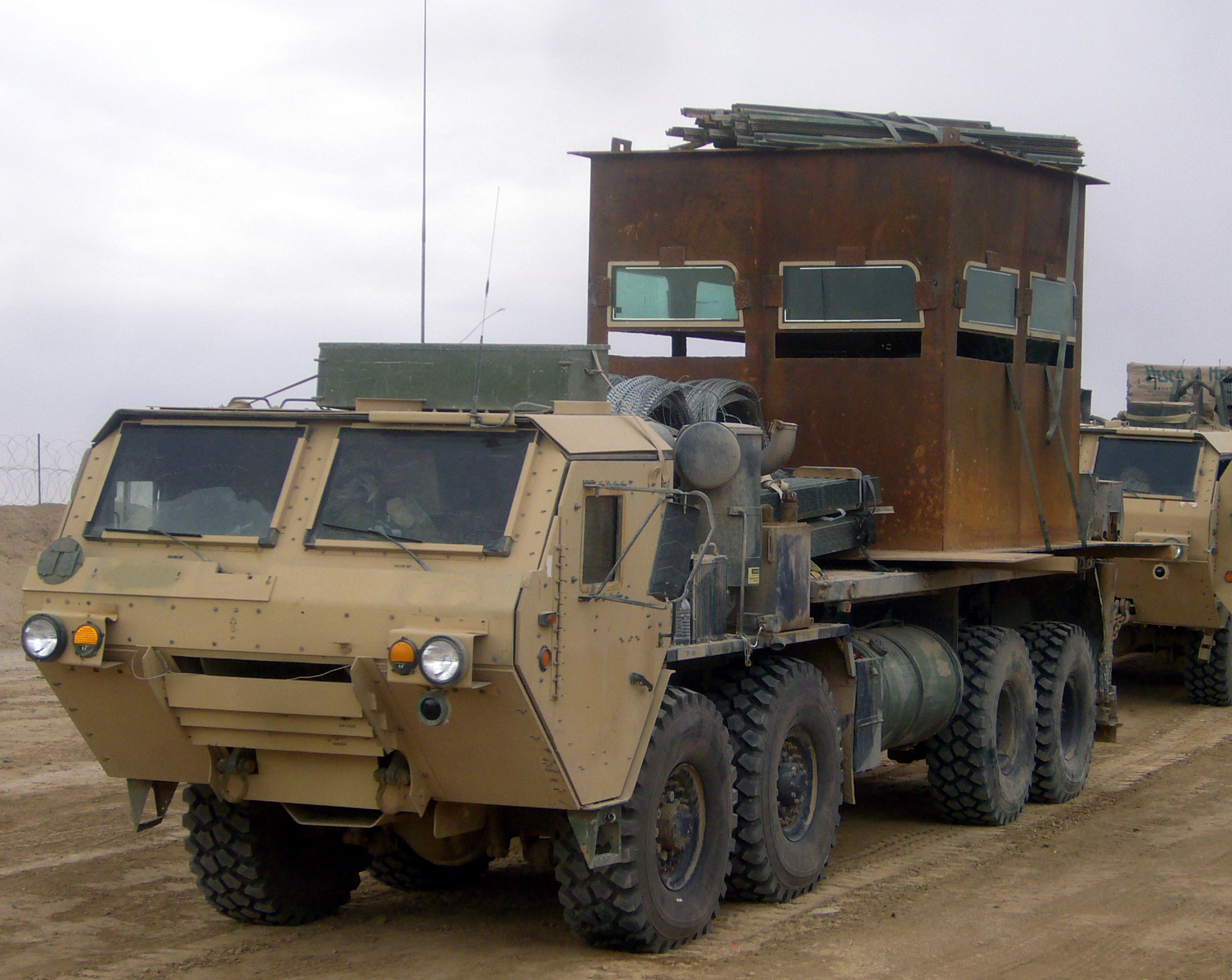
HEMTT M1120A2 with Simula/BAE Systems armoured package in Iraq. Notice the use of M1152 HMMWV armoured glass on the makeshift armoured superstructure.

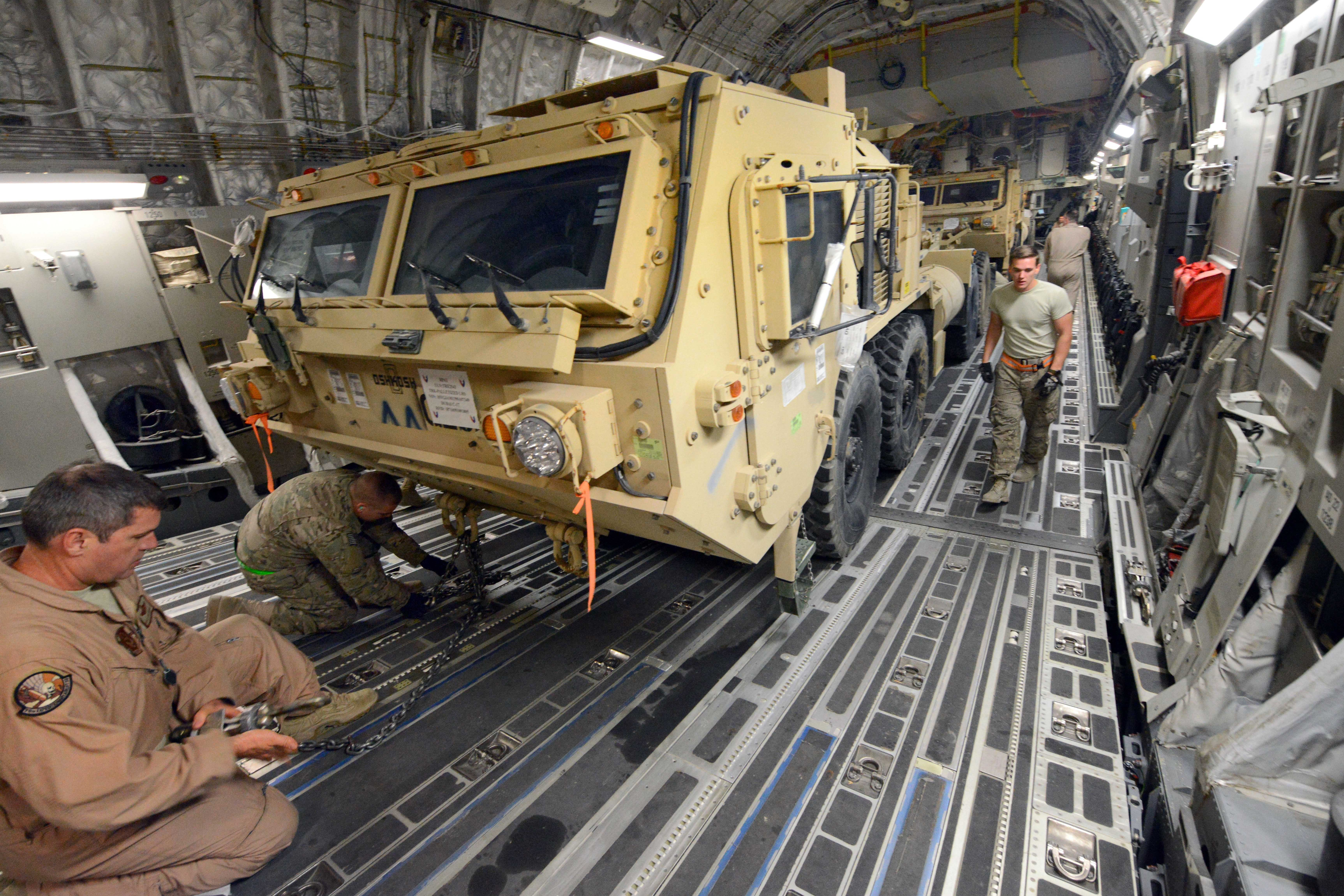
M1120A4 HEMTT with B-kit armor added to the standard A-kit cab

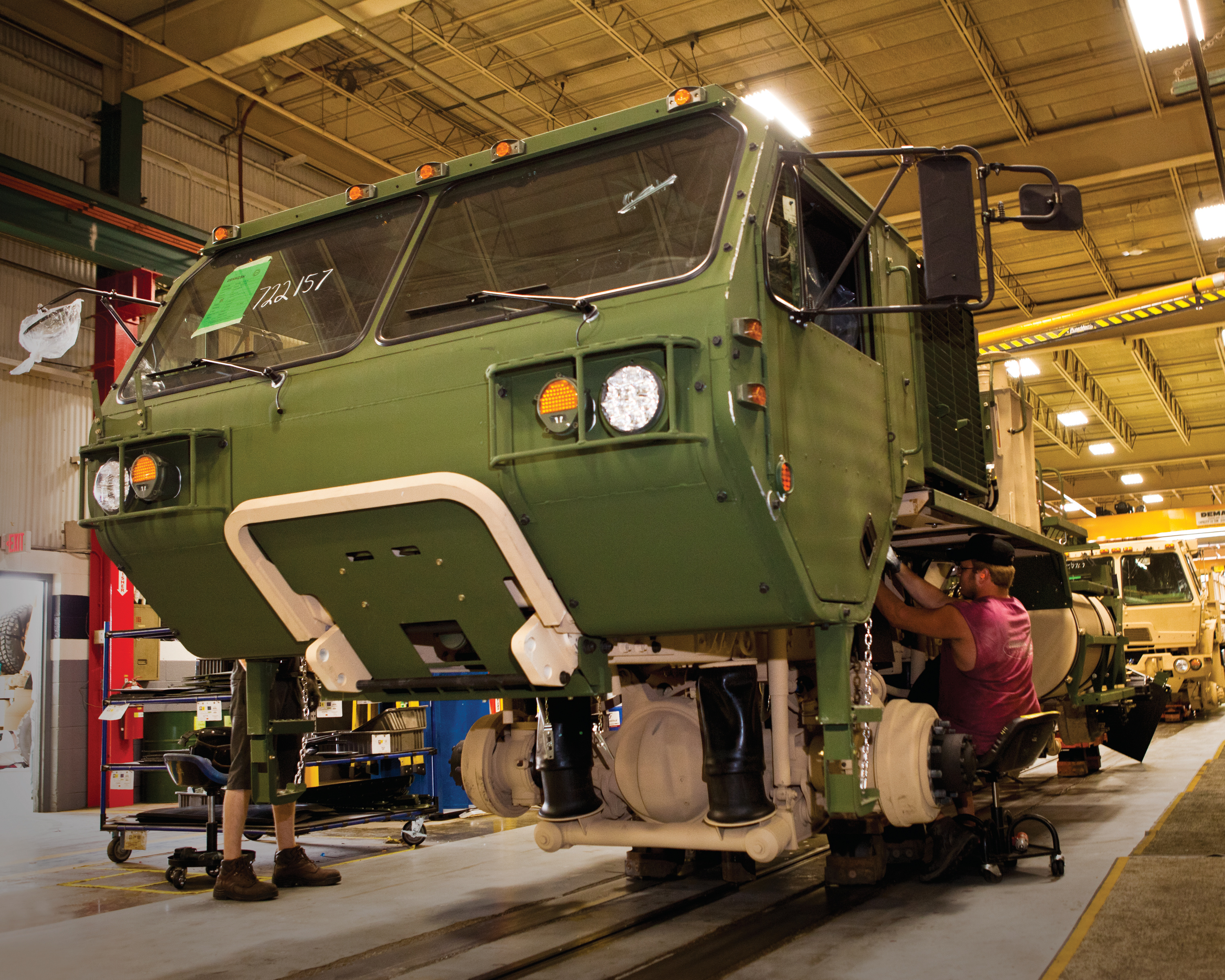
HEMTT A2 being Recap'd to A4 standard

== Operators ==
=== Current operators ===
- Afghanistan
- Bahrain
- Brazil (10 M984 wreckers to be delivered from 2020 to support the Iveco VBTP-MR Guarani 6x6 armored vehicles). 20 more ordered.
- Egypt
- Greece
- Iraq
- Israel (includes approx. 420 EDA examples in 2015)
- Jordan
- Kuwait
- Malaysia
- Morocco (believed EDA but not confirmed)
- Oman
- Romania used with the Patriot surface-to-air missile systems
- Qatar
- Saudi Arabia
- South Korea
- Taiwan
- Turkey
- UAE
- United States
- Ukraine

=== Future/potential operators ===
- Bulgaria

== See also ==
- Family of Medium Tactical Vehicles
- Heavy Equipment Transport System
- U.S. Army equipment M-numbers
- M939 Truck
- MAN gl
- MAZ-7310
- BAZ-6909
- Tatra 816
- Medium Tactical Vehicle Replacement
- Oshkosh Corporation
- Oshkosh L-ATV
- Logistic Vehicle System Replacement (LVSR)
- Oshkosh M-ATV
- Palletized Load System
- RMMV HX range of tactical trucks
- Shaanxi HMV3
- Sisu E13TP
- TA580/TAS5380
- TerraMax (vehicle)
- US Army tactical truck engines

== Bibliography ==
- Brothers of HEMTT - PLS-LVS by Carl Schulze (published by Tankograd) Tankograd
- HEMTT: US Heavy Expanded Mobility Tactical Truck by Carl Schulze (published by Tankograd) Tankograd
- Jane's Land Warfare Platforms 2015-2016: Logistics, Support & Unmanned ISBN 0710631723
- Jane's Land Warfare Platforms 2014/2015: Logistics, Support & Unmanned ISBN 0710631308
- Jane's Military Vehicles & Logistics 2004–2005 ISBN 0710626312
- Jane’s Land Warfare Platforms: Logistics, Support & Unmanned
- Modern U.S. Military Vehicles by Fred Crismon ISBN 0760305269
- Oshkosh Trucks: 75 Years of Specialty Truck Production (Paperback; November, 1992) (ISBN 0879386614)
- TM 9-2320-279-10-1 (vol. 1 of 2) (PDF). Archived (PDF) from the original on 9 October 2022. and TM 9-2320-279-10-2 (vol. 2 of 2) (PDF). Archived (PDF) from the original on 9 October 2022.Operator's Manual M977 Series, 8x8 Heavy Expanded Mobility Trucks (HEMTT). US Dept. of the Army. 1998.
