= Shaanxi SX2190 =

SX2190
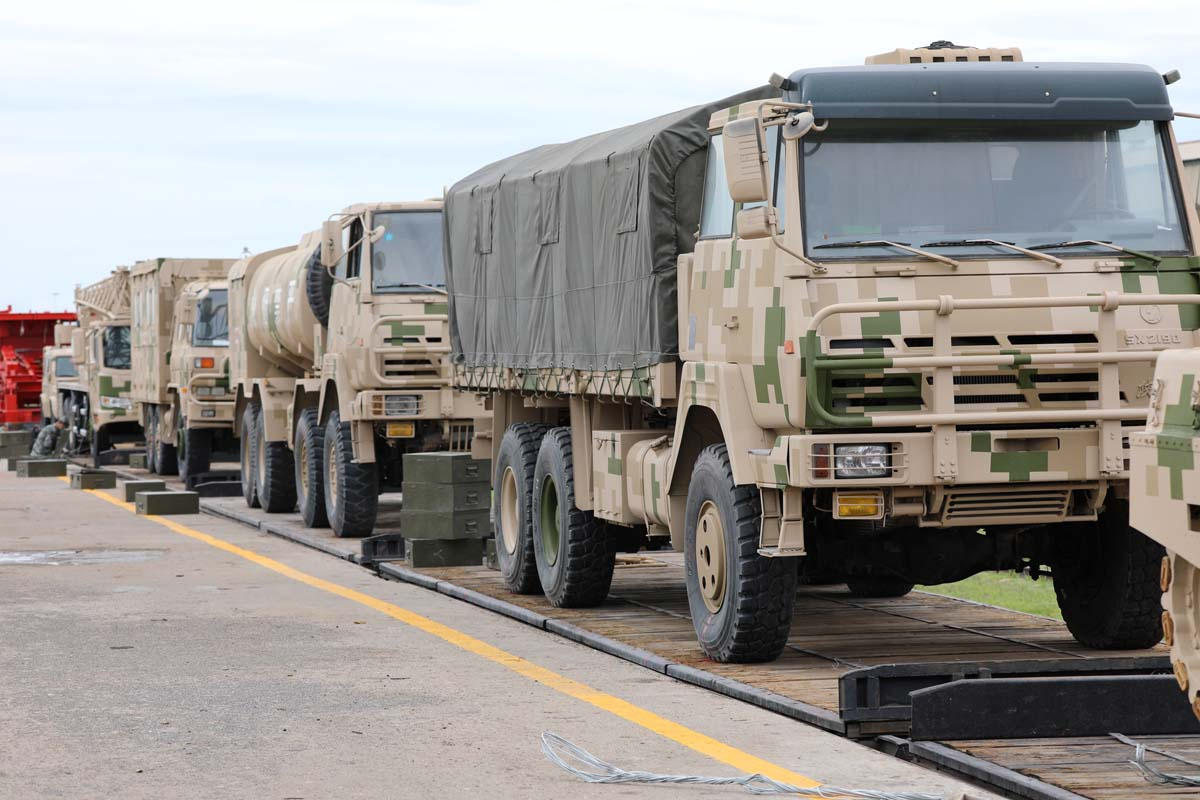
- Type: Special Heavy Truck
- Place of origin: People's Republic of China

Service history
- In service: Mid 1980s–present
- Used by: People's Liberation Army

Production history
- Designer: Shaanxi Automobile Group
- Designed: Mid 1980s
- Manufacturer: Shaanxi Automobile Group
- Produced: Mid 1980s–present
- No. built: unknown: Shaanxi SX2110; Shaanxi SX2153; Shaanxi SX4260; Shaanxi SX4323; Shaanxi SX2300

The SX2190 is a 8-ton class 6x6 special heavy duty truck used by the People's Liberation Army. It was developed to replace the Shaanxi SX2150, the truck is a licensed version of the Steyr 91 from Austria.
