= Shaanxi SX2150 =

Chinese 6x6 heavy duty truck

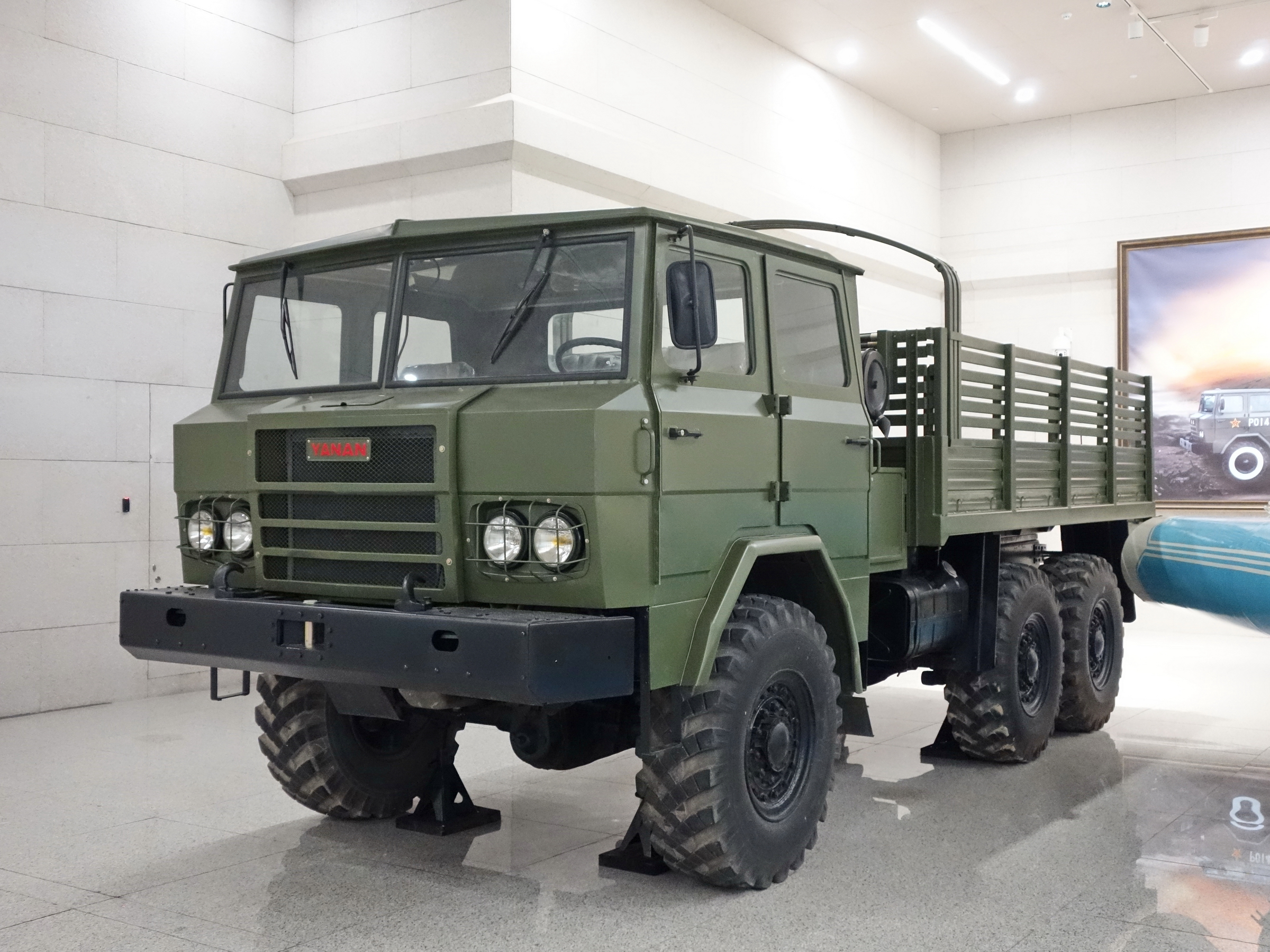
SX250, the predecessor of the SX2150

The SX2150 is a 5-ton class 6x6 special heavy-duty truck. The vehicle was phased out by the K variant or the SX2190 truck.

== Development ==
The SX-250, the predecessor of the SX2150, was developed and built by Shaanxi Automobile Works as a cross country vehicle in the 1960s and loosely based on the Soviet Ural-375 and the cab/cargo-bed designs of the French Berliet GBU 15. It was renamed by the Shaanxi Automobile Corporation Limited and used by the People's Liberation Army of the People's Republic of China for various uses (crane truck, transport cab, transport, etc...)

== Variants ==
- Shaanxi SX2150K
- Shaanxi SX2150KA
- Shaanxi SX2150KB
- Shaanxi SX2150KE
- Shaanxi SX2150KS
- Shaanxi SX4240E
