= QX-04 =

QX-04 CS/LP6
- Type: Semi-automatic pistol
- Place of origin: People's Republic of China

Production history
- Designer: Chongqing ChangFeng Machinery LTD.CO under China South Industries Group Corporation
- Manufacturer: Changfeng Machinery
- Produced: 2011
- Variants: CS/LP6

Specifications
- Mass: 930–960 g (33–34 oz)
- Length: 195 mm (7.7 in)
- Cartridge: 9×19mm Parabellum; .45 ACP; 7.62×25mm Tokarev; .40 S&W
- Action: Delayed blowback, locked breech, rotating barrel lock
- Feed system: Detachable box magazine: 15 rounds (7.62×25mm, 9×19mm); 13 rounds (.40 S&W); 12 rounds (.45 ACP)

The QX-04, or Q×4 (styled similarly to the Px4), is a Chinese semi-automatic pistol primarily targeted for international market and exportation.

== Design ==
The Qx4 pistol features a series of four different calibers, including 9×19mm Luger, .45 ACP, 7.62×25mm Tokarev and .40 S&W. By changing the slide, barrel, and magazine, it can fire all the four available calibers. This concept can be seen in other designs such as Beretta Px4 Storm.

The Qx4 shares a similar structure with the QSZ-92 service pistol yet differs in some aspects. The gun uses a unique operating principle wherein by the barrel is fluted in an opposite twist of the rifling. This fluting causes the pistol when fired to exert opposite rotational force on the barrel therein by locking the front of the slide to the barrel until the fired round leaves the gun. The action of the QX-04 can be seen as similar to that of the Savage made 1907 Automatic Handgun. It is still unclear as of this time if the weapon is considered a delayed-blowback or a retarded blowback pistol.

== Variant ==
=== CS/LP6 ===
Production variant, first appeared in public during 8th China International Exhibition on Police Equipment in May 2011.

== See also ==
- QSW-06
- QSZ-11
- QSB-11
- Type 54 pistol
- Type 64 pistol
- Type 77 pistol
- List of delayed-blowback firearms
