= QSW-06 =

- Type: Semi-automatic pistol
- Place of origin: China

Production history
- Designed: 2002–2005
- Produced: 2006–present

Specifications
- Mass: <1 kg (2.2 lb)
- Length: 195 mm (7.7 in) (without suppressor)
- Barrel length: 120 mm (4.7 in)
- Cartridge: 5.8x21 mm DCV05; 5.8×21mm DAP92
- Action: Short recoil, locked breech, non-rotating barrel lock
- Muzzle velocity: 895 m/s (2,940 ft/s)
- Effective firing range: 50 m (160 ft)
- Feed system: 20 round box magazine
- Sights: Fixed, 3-dot type, luminous inserts

The QSW-06 (Chinese: QSW06微声手枪, romanized: 06 Shì Wéishēng Shǒuqiāng, lit. 'Type 06 minimal noise hand gun') (Note: Sometimes referred to as the Type 06) is a suppressed semi-automatic pistol in service with the People's Liberation Army.

== History ==
After nearly four decades of service, the Type 67 suppressed pistol began to show its age. Issues surrounding the life of its integral suppressor, its low magazine capacity and overall performance had become an issue.

Trials for a replacement began in January 2002 after it was found that the QSZ-92s rotating barrel system was not suitable for a suppressor. After reviewing two pistol designs and fifteen different suppressor designs, eventually one suppressor and one pistol were selected for further testing after a thorough review by firearms experts and the PLA.

By December 2005 the design had been finalised and production began in early 2006 after undergoing under a series of trials including ones performed in arctic, arid and normal weather conditions.

== Design ==
The QSW-06 is a polymer framed, short recoil operated, semi-automatic pistol that shares its development history with the QSZ-92 pistol. Externally, both are similar in appearance and share 60% of the same components but have significant internal differences.

The most notable of these differences is, that while both pistols use a short recoil operation, the QSW-06 uses a non-rotating barrel lock as opposed to the QSZ-92 and its rotating barrel. The QSW-06 is chambered for DCV05 5.8 X 21mm subsonic round which creates less noise compared to standard pistol rounds.

The QSW-06 is also capable of firing the standard PLA pistol round, the DAP92 5.8 x 21mm as well. The QSW-06 uses a double-column, staggered-feed, twenty-round magazine as opposed to the QSZ-92's fifteen-round magazine. A rail has been placed under the barrel and various sights, flashlights and other accessories may be attached. Most importantly, the QSW-06 comes with a detachable suppressor that may be screwed onto the barrel.

== Users ==
- China
  - People's Liberation Army
  - People's Armed Police
  - People's Police

== See also ==
- QSZ-92
- QSZ-11
- QSB-11
- Type 54 pistol
- Type 64 pistol
- Type 77 pistol
