= Norinco 9mm Police Revolver =

Norinco 9mm Police Revolver 9mm警用转轮手枪
- Type: Revolver
- Place of origin: China

Service history
- In service: 2006–present
- Used by: People's Republic of China: People's Police

Production history
- Designed: 2005–2006
- Manufacturer: China North Industries Group Corporation (Norinco)
- Produced: 2006–present

Specifications
- Mass: 650 g (1.43 lb)
- Length: 186 mm (7.3 in)
- Cartridge: 9×19mm Parabellum
- Action: Double-action/single-action
- Effective firing range: 50 m (160 ft)
- Feed system: 6-Round cylinder
- Sights: Metal notched rear sight and fixed front sight

The 9mm police revolver (Chinese: 9mm警用转轮手枪) is a revolver produced in the People's Republic of China. It is also identified as ZLS05, Type 05 and Norinco NP-216.

== History and development ==
The 9mm police revolver, also known as the ZLS05 or Type 05, was the first pistol commissioned by the Ministry of Public Security in China, earning its nickname "first gun of the Chinese police". Prior to ZLS05, Chinese police forces only used decommissioned weapons from the People's Liberation Army, such as the Type 77 pistol and Type 79 submachine gun. The Type 05 was developed in the 2000s to replace the Type 54 pistol, Type 64 pistol, and Type 77 pistol in the police service. In 2001, Chinese police adopted the QSZ-92 9×19mm Parabellum version. Despite the adoption, the Ministry of Public Security requested a dedicated handgun platform designed to shoot less-lethal ammo and meet other police-specific requirements.

The two primary considerations for the Type 05 program were the recognizability of police firearms and the ability to shoot 9 mm (0.35 in) less-lethal ammunition. For the purpose of distinguishing from military semi-automatic pistols and to shoot low-recoil non-lethal ammo, the Chinese police chose the revolver as the form factor. The reloader and cylinder of the Type 05 revolver also have color differentiation, black for rubber bullets and red for lethal ammunition. To ensure non-lethality, the Type 05 rubber bullet has a muzzle velocity of less than 110 m/s (360 ft/s) and a muzzle energy of less than 17.6J.

After adoption, the Ministry of Public Security found out that the Type 05 has insufficient power to stop violent criminals, especially those charging towards the police officers or those with illegal possession of their own firearms. There were also legal concerns over a weapon that can shoot both lethal and non-lethal ammunition, since Chinese laws didn't have legal provisions for the use of pistols in non-violent scenarios, rendering the rubber bullet not applicable to any situation de jure. In 2005, most police departments in China decided to treat the revolver as a lethal firearm and to equip it only with lethal ammunition.

However, as a combat firearm, Type 05's design that prioritizes low stopping power and long reload time made it far less useful than the regular QSZ-92 pistol. Due to its low power being reported in the media, the revolver had a weak psychological impact on criminals, making them more likely to resist police chase or warning shots when they saw the Type 05 was being used.

Due to the lack of both a legal basis for non-lethal operations and combat power for lethal operations, the Type 05 was gradually phased out of the police service.

In 2014, the NRP9 Police Revolver was introduced, with various improvements over the 2005/06 version and chambered in .38 Special ammunition.

In 2018, the CS/LP9 revolver was introduced, an improved ZLS-05 chambered in .357 Magnum and .38 Special. It can use the same speed loader for ZLS05 and NRP9.

== Design ==
The overall dimension of the Type 05 is 197 mm (7.8 in) × 35.6 mm (1.40 in) × 125 mm (4.9 in), the barrel length is 76.2 mm (3.00 in), the aiming baseline is 108 mm (4.3 in), and the whole gun weighs 840 g (1.85 lb). The ammunition capacity is 6 rounds, and the barrel life exceeds 3,000 rounds. The initial velocity is about 300 m/s (980 ft/s), and the effective range is 50 m (160 ft). There are two launch methods, single-action and double-action. The gun can fire 9mm DAP92 pistol ammunition, 9×19mm Parabellum ammunition, and China-made 9mm low-penetration non-lethal ammunition, and it can also fire blanks for alarm and warning to suspects. It can also be loaded with various riot control ammunition, such as low-penetration type, barrier type, dispersive type, non-lethal type, etc., to deal with various emergencies.

== Variants ==
ZLS05
Original designation
NP216
Export designation for ZLS05
NRP9
Lengthed ZLS05, export version chambered in .38 Special.
CS/LP9
Improved ZLS05, export version chambered in .357 magnum and .38 Special.

== Users ==
- China: People's Police
