= QSZ-11 =

Chinese pistol

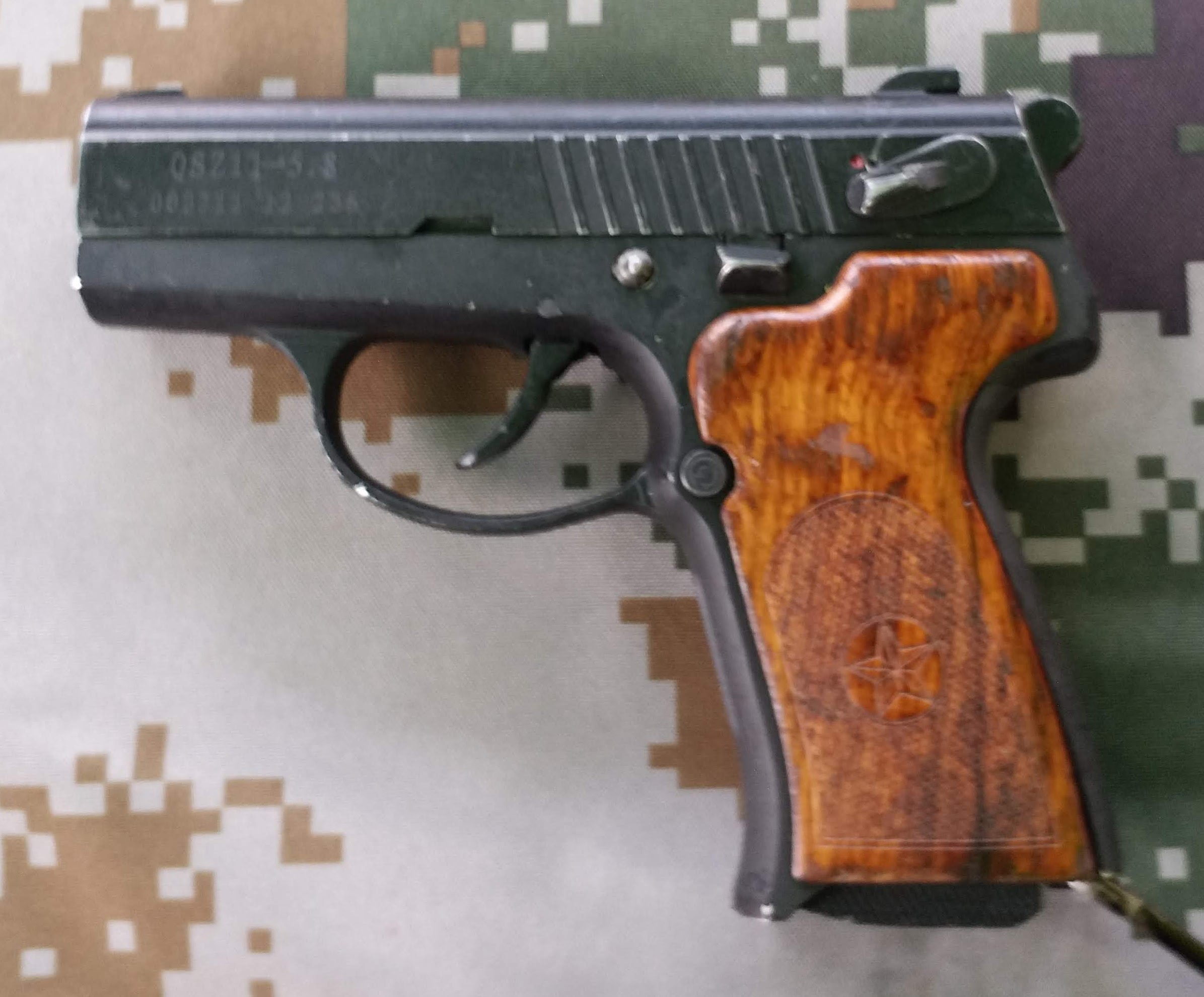
- QSZ-11 taken during Shek Kong Barracks Opening in June 2018
- Type: Semi-automatic pistol
- Place of origin: China

Service history
- In service: 2011-present

Specifications
- Mass: 0.6 kg (1.3 lb)
- Length: 153 mm (6.0 in)
- Barrel length: 120.7 mm (4.75 in)
- Cartridge: 5.8×21mm DAP92; 5.8×21mm DCV05
- Action: Recoil-operated, locked-breech, rotating barrel lock
- Muzzle velocity: 350±15m/s
- Effective firing range: 50 m (55 yd)
- Feed system: 8-round detachable box magazine

The QSZ-11 (Chinese: 11式手枪; pinyin: 11 shì shǒuqiāng; lit. 'Type 11 pistol') or is a compact semi-automatic pistol designed and manufactured by Norinco. (Note: The pistol's designation "QSZ" stands for "'light weapon' (qīng wŭqì)—'pistol' (shǒuqiāng)—'automatic' (zìdòng)".)

== History ==
The development of the QSZ-11 began in 2008 and was adopted by the People's Liberation Army in 2011 for officers, guards, reconnaissance personnel, security details, and taikonauts.

In 2014, during the Hong Kong Garrison open day, the QSZ-11 was shown and prompted media attention and much discussion from Chinese milbloggers due to its compact size and exquisite appearance.

== Design ==
The QSZ-11 is a compact, aluminium alloy frame pistol that operates with a recoil-operated, locked-breech and has a rotating barrel locking system.

=== Safety ===
Like the QSZ-92 5.8mm variant, the QSZ-11 can only be put on safety when the trigger is ready to fire, which ensures safety in use and the ability to fire quickly with a round in the chamber.

Similar to most modern handguns, the QSZ-11 has a single-action/double-action trigger with a combined safety. It also uses the traditional patridge sight.

=== Ergonomics ===
The aesthetic design of the QSZ-11 was a key factor in the development stage, as high-level officers would be armed with it, and many well-known designers and art schools in China were consulted for the design.

The grip of the pistol features walnut timber with a carved design. The holster used is also very retro and references the 1960s style.

=== Ammunition ===
Like the QSZ-92-5.8, the QSZ-11 pistol fires the 5.8x21mm DAP pistol ammunition and 5.8x21mm DCV05 subsonic rounds.

Due to the double-stack single-feed magazine of the QSZ-92 often being criticised for its poor reliability, the QSZ11 pistol adopts an 8-round single-stack design, equipped with a window displaying the ammunition, so that the remaining ammunition is clearly visible.

== Users ==
- People's Republic of China
  - People's Liberation Army

== See also ==
- QSW-06
- QSB-11
- Type 54 pistol
- Type 64 pistol
- Type 77 pistol
