= CS/LS6 =

CS/LS06 (CF-05) Changfeng submachine gun
- Type: Submachine gun
- Place of origin: China

Service history
- In service: 2005–present
- Used by: See Users

Production history
- Designer: Qing Shangsheng
- Designed: 1993–1994 (5.8mm prototype); 2001–2005 (9mm)
- Manufacturer: Chongqing Changfeng
- Produced: 2005–present
- Variants: See Variants

Specifications
- Mass: 2.1 kg (w/empty magazine)
- Length: 405 mm (Stock retracted); 588 mm (stock extended)
- Barrel length: 232 mm
- Width: 64 mm
- Height: 195 mm
- Cartridge: 9×19mm Parabellum
- Action: Blowback
- Rate of fire: 800 Rounds/minute
- Muzzle velocity: 400 m/s
- Effective firing range: 150 m
- Feed system: 50-round helical magazine
- Sights: Open sights

The CS/LS6, formerly CS/LS06 or CF-05, also known as the Changfeng submachine gun (Chinese: 长风冲锋枪/長風衝鋒槍; pinyin: Cháng Fēng chōng fēng qiāng), is a submachine gun developed by Chongqing ChangFeng Co. Ltd in the early 1990s in response to China's demand for a new submachine gun design.

It was developed by the same team who designed the QSZ-92 pistol, which is now the primary pistol used by PLA and PAP. Originally designed for 5.8×21mm cartridge, after being rejected by the PLA it was offered for export chambered in 9×19mm Parabellum.

== Development ==
The CF-05 was designed by Qing Shangsheng, a senior designer of Chongqing ChangFeng Corporation, who also designed the QSZ-92 pistol. According to the designer, the CF-05 was his private project initiated between 1993 and 1994, and was not brought to the attention of his factory manager until 1996. Early prototypes were built to compete in People's Liberation Army's 5.8mm suppressed submachine gun project. The first prototypes had a secondary feed option, with a pistol magazine inserted into the pistol grip in addition to the distinctive helical magazine inserted at the feed-port located at the rear of the weapon, which makes the magazine work like a dual-purpose gunstock. Once the primary magazine had been exhausted, the shooter could switch to the secondary magazine to sustain firing. The rear-feed design was changed during the testing due to the inconvenience in ergonomics, also the firearms expert felt the feed hole at the gun rear aesthetically unpleasing. Eventually, Changfeng's bid lost to Jianshe Corporation's QCW-05 proposal in 2001.

After losing to QCW-05, Changfeng decided that export sales were to be a priority, and they needed to make a 9mm version, later named QC-9. Development team made several other improvements to improve the design’s ergonomics and reliability. The second prototype moved the helical cylinder to the top, and it features a new telescoping stock. The third prototype made an improvement to the stock. Upon testing, the secondary feed option was abandoned due to the possibility of introducing malfunctions caused by human error during field operations. In March 2004, the final prototype, which dropped the secondary feed function, went through a review before the design was finalized in May 2005. The finalized prototype received internal designation CF-05. Export effort was made in 2006, which gives the production designation CS/LS06, the current name marketed by Norinco.

== Design ==
The CF05 submachine gun is a blowback-operated weapon chambered for the 9 × 19 mm cartridge. It fires from a closed bolt of a telescoped design, which wraps around the barrel. The weapon feeds ammunition from a 50-round helical magazine located at the top of the polymer receiver. It is fitted with a collapsible stock and the barrel is threaded to accept a suppressor. Other accessories may include a laser pointer, tactical flashlight, and daylight optics.

The latest model of the CS/LS06 features modified polymer furniture, a front pistol grip with a different grip angle, a modified trigger guard, a different stock design, and pictographic selector markings. Although it is externally similar to Calico M950, the feed system features an entirely new design due to CS/LS06's rear-feed design lineage. The cylinder magazine contains a helical glide grooves on its inner walls. When the glide rotates around the central axis, the cartridges follow the helical track inside the cylinder. This design allows the gun to store 50 rounds of ammunition ina relatively compact package.

== Variants ==
Changfeng submachine gun
Early prototype chambered in 5.8×21mm ammo.
QC-9
Early 9×19mm Parabellum prototypes.
CF-05
Finalized 9×19mm Parabellum prototype.
CS/LS06
Export designation by Norinco.

== Users ==
- China: People's Police and People's Armed Police
- Myanmar: 100,000 units
- Uganda: Uganda National Police
- Venezuela: Venezuelan Army In service with the 509 Special Forces Battalion of the Army, Presidential Honor Guard, and the Special Unit for Security and Protection of State Personalities (UESPPE).

== See also ==
- CS/LS5
- CS/LS7
