= QCW-05 =

QCW05 / QCQ05
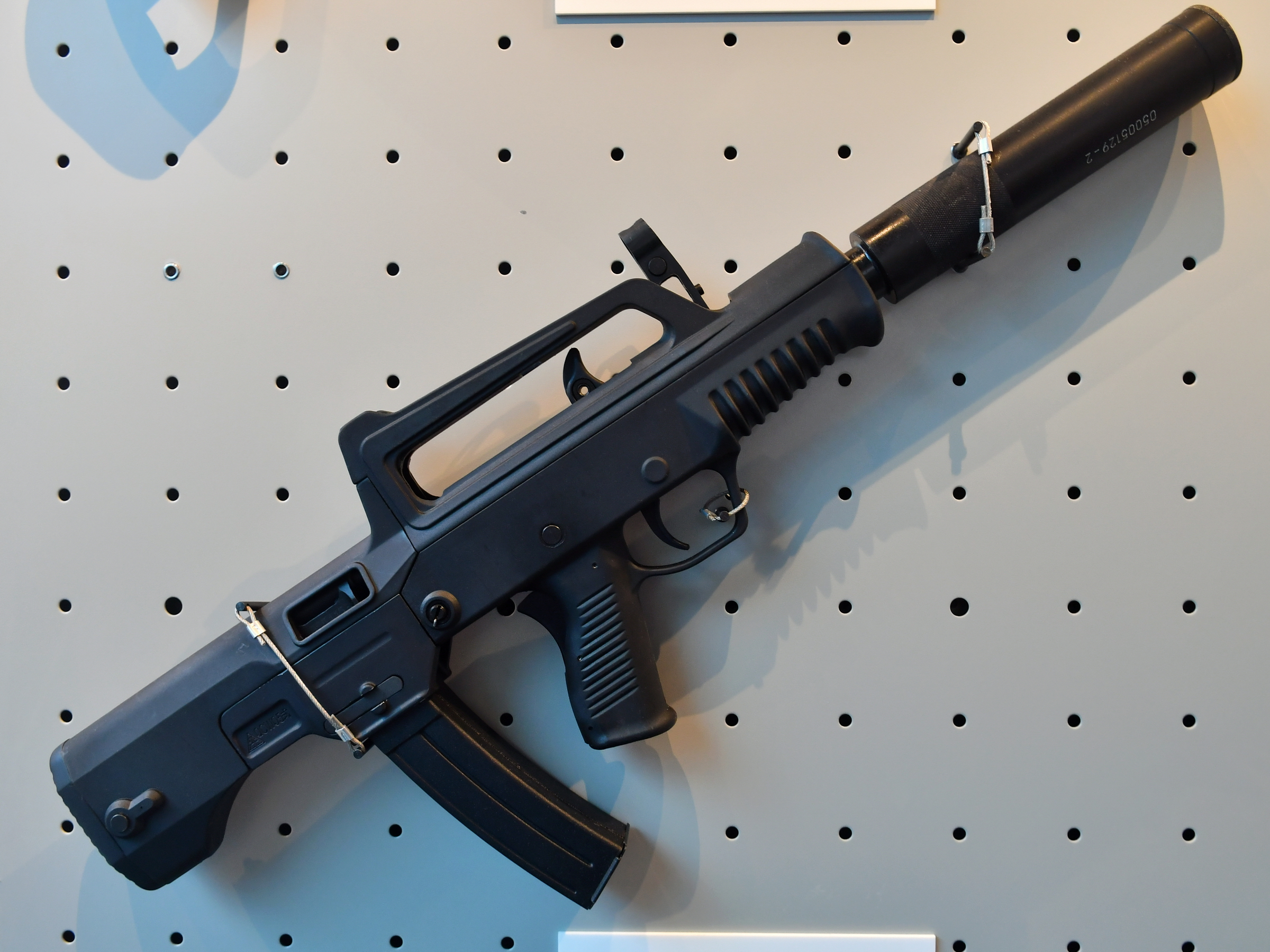
- QCW05 - 5.8mm submachine gun
- Type: Bullpup submachine gun
- Place of origin: People's Republic of China

Production history
- Designer: Jianshe Industry (Group) Corporation
- Designed: 2001–2005
- Manufacturer: China South Industries Group
- Produced: 2005–present
- Variants: JS 9 mm, QCQ-05

Specifications
- Mass: 2.2 kg (4.85 lb)
- Length: 500 mm (19.7 in)
- Barrel length: 250 mm (9.8 in)
- Cartridge: 5.8×21mm (DAP92 and DCV05); 9×19mm (JS 9 mm)
- Caliber: 5.8mm 9mm (JS 9 mm)
- Action: Blowback, open bolt
- Rate of fire: 900 rounds/min
- Muzzle velocity: QCW-05 - 150 m/s (490 ft/s); QCQ-05 - 321 m/s (1,050 ft/s)
- Effective firing range: 200 m (660 ft)
- Maximum firing range: 400 m (1,300 ft)
- Feed system: 50-round detachable box magazine
- Sights: Flip-up rear sight Y/MAL-05 (2×) visible laser module combo sight

The QCW-05 (Chinese: 轻武器, 冲锋, 微声-05; pinyin: Qīng wǔqì-Chōngfēng-Wēishēng 05; lit. 'Light weapon', 'Sub-machine gun', 'Suppressed-05'), also referred to as the Type 05 Suppressed Submachine Gun (Chinese: 05式微声冲锋枪), is a suppressed bullpup submachine gun, manufactured and developed by the China South Industries Group 208 Research Institute and Jianshe Industries (Group) Corporation of Chongqing under the China South Industries Group.

== Development ==
In October 2001 the Jianshe Industries (Group) Corporation (owned by the China South Industries Group) won a bid to produce the PLA's next generation of submachine gun to replace the Type 79 and the Type 85 silenced submachine guns, beating out other competitors such as the Changfeng CF-05 due to its ease of construction and operation. At the 2005 International Police Equipment Expo in Beijing, Jianshe revealed their final product, a bullpup, blowback, open bolt submachine gun that externally resembled the QBZ-95 assault rifle, which was then given the designation QCW-05.

In 2004, Jianshe Industries developed JS 9 mm, a police- and export-oriented version of the QCW-05. The first prototype of the JS 9mm is essentially a shortened QCW-05, with the same carry handle and iron sights, but with a modified caliber for the popular 9×19mm Parabellum. The second prototype removed the carry handle and opted for a Picatinny rail. The JS 9 mm was first showcased in 2005 at the China Police Equipment Exhibition.

== Design ==
The QCW-05 is a blowback, open bolt bullpup silenced submachine gun capable of either full automatic or semi-automatic fire. The QCW-05's light weight can be attributed to its small aluminum receiver and polymer construction. There is a thumb fire mode selector on the left side of the weapon directly above the grip with a semi-automatic position (1), full automatic (2), and safety (0), and an ejection port on the right side of the weapon. The carrying handle, which is located above the compact aluminum receiver, houses the charging handle.

The primary accessory of the QCW-05 is the removable screw-on, cylindrical suppressor. Once the suppressor is removed, the QCW-05 is essentially the same as the QCQ-05. Unlike previous Chinese submachine guns with integrated suppressor, detachable suppressor makes QCW-05/QCQ-05 more versatile in combat. The default optics for the QCW-05/QCQ-05 are the Y/MAL-05 combo optics featuring a 2× zoom lens and a visible laser module attached on top.

Outline of QCW-05s 50-round, quad-stacked, double-feed proprietary magazine

This weapon is designed for the 5.8×21mm DCV05 subsonic round, which is designed with a heavier tip, smokeless firing, and low muzzle velocity. The use of the 5.8×21mm DV05 subsonic round reduced the QCW-05's muzzle velocity to approximately 150 m/s (490 ft/s) and a loudness of 120 decibels (7 decibels quieter than the Type 85 submachine gun). Ammunition is fed from a detachable 50-round, quad-stacked, double-feed, straight-insert box magazine. In an emergency, the QCW-05 can fire 5.8×21mm DAP92 regular supersonic ammunition, but this will shorten the suppressor's lifespan. The QCQ-05 is optimized for shooting the regular 5.8 pistol ammunition.

== Variants ==
=== JS 9mm ===
A slightly smaller, somewhat externally different version of the QCW-05 designed for use by police and for export overseas. The JS 9mm is chambered for the 9×19mm Parabellum cartridge, and it also uses the same 30-round box magazine. A 50-round quad stack magazine for the 9×19mm was also developed, but did not enter production. Another noticeable difference is that JS 9mm doesn't have a carrying handle; instead, a picatinny rail could be mounted on the top.

=== QCQ-05 ===
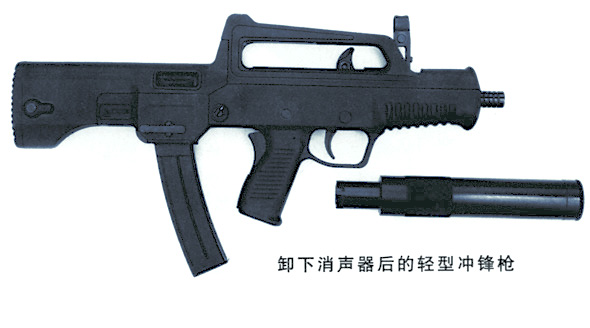
The QCW-05 with its suppressor removed, designated QCQ-05

The QCQ-05 (Chinese: 05式轻型冲锋枪) is the designation when the QCW-05's suppressor is removed. The QCQ-05 is essentially the same gun as the QCW-05. The QCQ-05 is capable of using either the 5.8×21mm DCV05 subsonic pistol cartridge or the 5.8×21mm DAP92 pistol cartridge which is also used by the QSZ-92 pistol.

== Users ==
- People's Republic of China
  - People's Armed Police
  - People's Liberation Army
  - People's Police
  - Militia
