= Type 59 =

Type 59 may refer to:

- Type 59 tank, a Chinese main battle tank
- Type 59 pistol, a Chinese copy of the Makarov pistol
- Type 59 machine gun, a Chinese copy of the SGMT coaxial machine gun
- Type 59 frag grenade, a Chinese copy of the RGD-5 grenade
- Type 59 anti-personnel mine, a Chinese copy of the POMZ-2 stake mine
- Type 59 anti-tank mine, a Chinese copy of the TM-46 anti-tank mine
- Type 59 and Type 59-1 field gun, Chinese copies of the Soviet 130 mm towed field gun M1954 (M-46)
- Type 59 57 mm anti-aircraft gun, a Chinese copy of the Soviet 57 mm AZP S-60 anti-aircraft gun
- Type 59 100 mm anti-aircraft gun, a Chinese copy of the Soviet KS-19 anti-aircraft gun
- Type 59 Marksman, a Chinese self-propelled anti-aircraft vehicle based on the British Marksman anti-aircraft system
- Bugatti Type 59, a racing car of the 1930s
