= CS/LS5 =

- Type: Submachine gun
- Place of origin: China

Production history
- Designer: Jianshe Industry (Group) Corporation
- Designed: 2006
- Manufacturer: China South Industries Group
- Produced: 2012–present
- Variants: SMG9

Specifications
- Mass: 2.5 kg (empty)
- Length: 690 mm (27.2 in) stock extended / 460 mm (18.1 in) stock folded
- Barrel length: 216 mm (8.5 in)
- Cartridge: 9×19mm DAP92-9; 9×19mm Parabellum; 9×21mm IMI
- Action: Gas-operated, closed bolt
- Effective firing range: 100–150 m
- Feed system: 30-round detachable box magazine
- Sights: Adjustable iron sights with Picatinny rail for optics

The CS/LS5 is a submachine gun developed by the Jianshe Industries (Group) Corporation of Chongqing. The CS/LS5 design is chambered for indigenous armour-piercing 9×19mm DAP-92 ammunition, but can also use the popular 9×19mm Parabellum round used internationally by armed forces and law enforcement for most pistols and submachine guns, as well as domestically developed less lethal rubber ammunition.

== Design and development ==
The CS/LS5 has a short-stroke gas piston system which operates in closed bolt. It comes with a 216 mm barrel chambered in 9×19mm Parabellum cartridge, with rear and front iron sights, accessory steel Picatinny rail mounts and a folding stock. It features a left-mounted selector switch for fully automatic (law enforcement/military models) and semi-automatic fire, with the charging handle at the upper front left of the weapon. The CS/LS5 somewhat resembles the MP5 and FAMAE SAF visually, but differ mechanically.

The standard weapon weighs overall 2.7 kilograms (6.0 lb) with loaded magazine. The weapon was an export-orientated project, and was never accepted into Chinese military or law enforcement organisations.

== Civilian variants ==
A semi-automatic civilian variant of the CS/LS5 called the SMG9 was developed by Sino Defense Manufacturing for the European market. It was originally designed for 9×19mm Parabellum, but a version chambered in 9×21mm was made for the Italian market and imported by Prima Armi S.r.l. Like the CS/LS5, the SMG9 is fed from 30-round magazines, but magazines modified to only hold 15 rounds were also produced.

== See also ==
- CS/LS6
- CS/LS7
