= JS 9 mm =

- Type: Bullpup submachine gun
- Place of origin: China

Production history
- Designer: Jianshe Industry (Group) Corporation
- Manufacturer: China South Industries Group
- Produced: 2006–present

Specifications
- Mass: 2 kg (4.41 lb)
- Length: 450 mm (17.7 in)
- Barrel length: 250 mm (9.8 in)
- Cartridge: 9×19mm Parabellum; 9×19mm DAP92-9
- Action: Blowback, open bolt
- Rate of fire: 900 rounds/min
- Muzzle velocity: 321 m/s (1,050 ft/s)
- Effective firing range: 200 m (660 ft)
- Maximum firing range: 400 m (1,300 ft)
- Feed system: 20- or 30-round detachable box magazine
- Sights: Open sight block, fixed front peep sight, flip up back sights

The CS/LS2, formerly known as the JS 9 mm (Chinese: JS 9 mm冲锋枪; pinyin: JS 9 mm Chōngfēng Qiāng; lit. 'JS 9 mm Submachine Gun') is a commercial export version of the QCW-05 submachine gun used by the People's Liberation Army. The weapon is designed specifically for police and law enforcement.

== Development ==
Following the development of the QCW-05 submachine gun, Jianshe Industries (Group) Corporation, a company under the China South Industries Group Corporation developed a police- and export-oriented version of the QCW-05, called JS 9. The first prototype of the JS 9mm is essentially a shortened QCW-05, with the same carry handle and iron sights, but with a modified caliber for the popular 9×19mm Parabellum. The second prototype removed the carry handle and opted for a Picatinny rail. The JS 9 mm was first showcased in 2005 at the China Police Equipment Exhibition.

== Design ==
The JS submachine gun is a bullpup weapon similar to the QCW-05. It is slightly shorter than the QCW05 and does not feature the carry handle. Instead, a Picatinny rail is located on top of the upper receiver, which allows customization of optics. The JS 9 mm features both automatic and semi-automatic firing mode.

The JS 9 mm is designed to take commercially available 9×19mm Parabellum or the indigenous 9×19mm DAP92-9 round. It is also capable of accepting widely used MP5 magazines, along with its own double-column 20- and 30-round box magazines. A 50-round quad-stack magazine for the 9×19mm was also developed, but did not enter production.

The JS 9 mm features several accessories, including daylight sights, night vision sights, infrared sights, and screw-on suppressors.

== Users ==
- China
  - Ministry of Public Security
  - People's Armed Police
- Laos: Used by special forces
- Mali: Used by special forces and police
