= QSB-11 =

Chinese knife gun

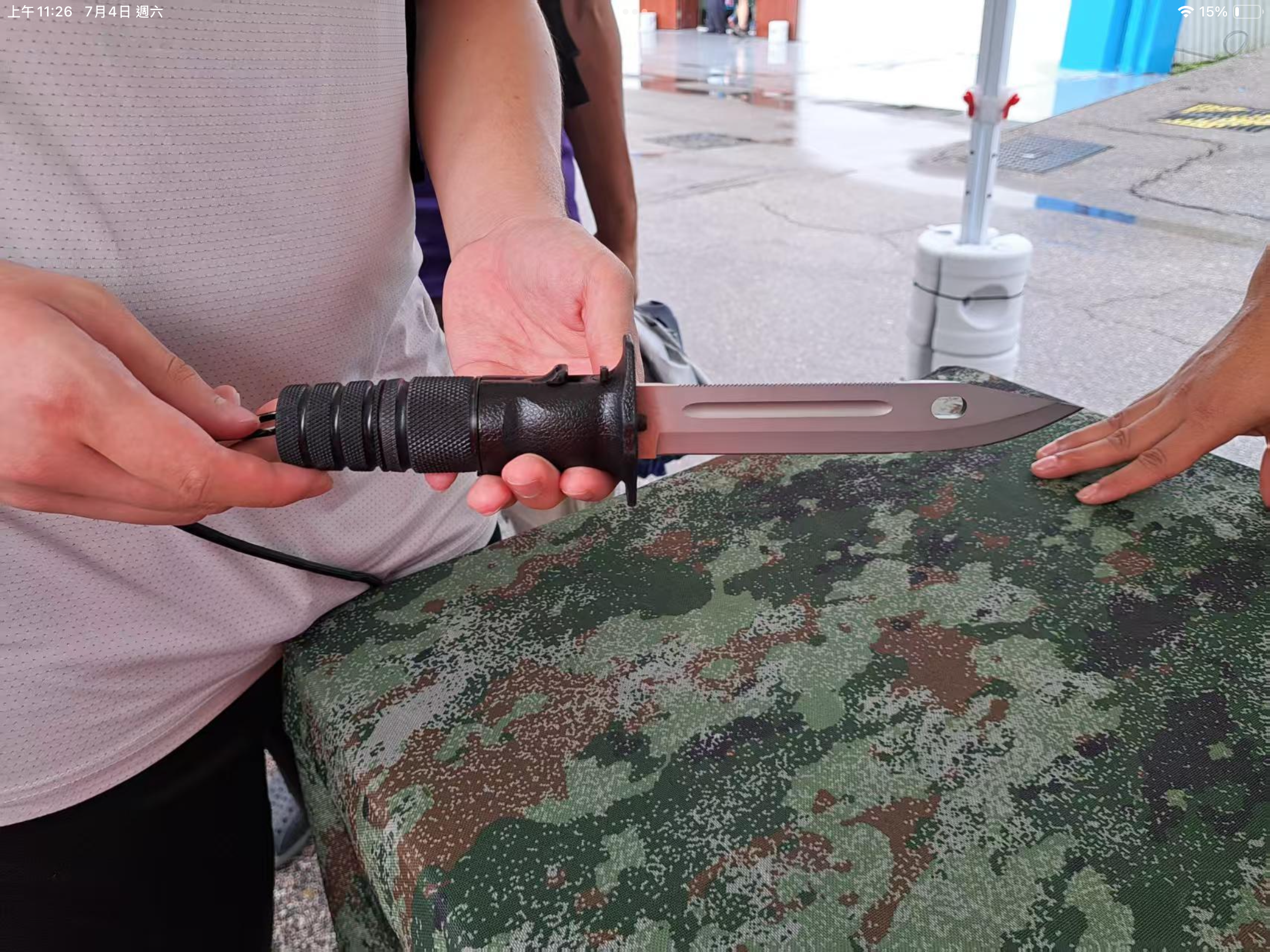
- QSB-11 knife pistol
- Type: Knife pistol
- Place of origin: China

Service history
- In service: 2011-present
- Used by: People's Liberation Army

Production history
- Designer: 974 Factory
- Designed: 2000-2011
- Manufacturer: 974 Factory
- Produced: 2011-present

Specifications
- Mass: 0.69 kg (1.5 lb)
- Length: 291 mm (11.5 in)
- Cartridge: 5.8×21mm DCV05
- Caliber: 5.8mm (.228in)
- Barrels: 4, rifled
- Action: Double-action trigger Firing pin
- Muzzle velocity: 290m/s (951ft/s)
- Effective firing range: 10 m (11 yd)
- Maximum firing range: 50 m (55 yd)
- Blade type: High-carbon steel Clip-point; 166 mm (6.5 in)
- Hilt type: Hollow cylindrical black plastic handle Built-in barrel and firing mechanism
- Scabbard/sheath: Plastic with sharpening stone

The QSB-11 (Chinese: 11式匕首枪; pinyin: 11 shì bǐshǒu qiāng; lit. 'Type 11 dagger pistol') (Note: The pistol's designation "QSZ" stands for "'light weapon' (Qīng wŭqì)— 'pistol' (Shǒuqiāng)—'dagger' (Bǐshǒu)".) is a knife pistol designed by Chinese defense manufacturer 974 Factory.

== History ==
Research for the QSB-11 began in the 1990s, as it is designed for paratroopers, special forces, and special police forces of the People's Liberation Army and People's Armed Police.

== Design ==
The QSB-11 consists of the blade, gun, sight, firing mechanism, and sheath.

The QSB-11 shows features of a survival knife. Developed from the QSB-91, the blade was lengthened to 166mm, and the blade shape was improved. The sheath is multi-purpose; it can be used for cutting when used in combination with the knife and features a sharpening stone. The saw file on the spine of the blade can be used for filing. In addition to the functions of a pistol and dagger, the QSB-11 also has many other functions such as sawing, filing, cutting (only in combination with the sheath), and stabbing. The QSB-11 can also be used for opening cans and bottle caps. It can remove obstacles in harsh environments, which increases its practicality in battlefield scenarios.

Unlike the QSB-91, which has a common firing mechanism for all four barrels, the QSB-11 is equipped with an individual firing mechanism for each barrel. After pulling the trigger, the hammer, under the action of spring force, aligns with the firing pin hole, strikes the primer of the bullet to ignite the firing charge, generating gas to push the bullet along the rifling to fire out of the barrel.

If there is a dud, it is possible to pull the trigger again and directly fire the next round. The knife must be unsheathed when firing. The firing pin and mechanism are located within a screw-in cover of the hilt. The trigger is activated by pushing it forward rather than pulling; the thumb is used to do this. The safety is located in front of the trigger and prevents the user from pushing the trigger. The hilt contains four barrels, split into two on each side by the blade, and one barrel holds one ammunition. This means that the total ammunition capacity of the QSB-11 is four. To reload, the operator must unscrew the rear cover and manually remove the shells from the back of the barrel.

Like the QSZ-92-5.8 and QSZ-11, the QSB-11 fires the 5.8x21mm DCV05 subsonic round.

== Users ==
- China
