= Type 59 pistol =

Type 59
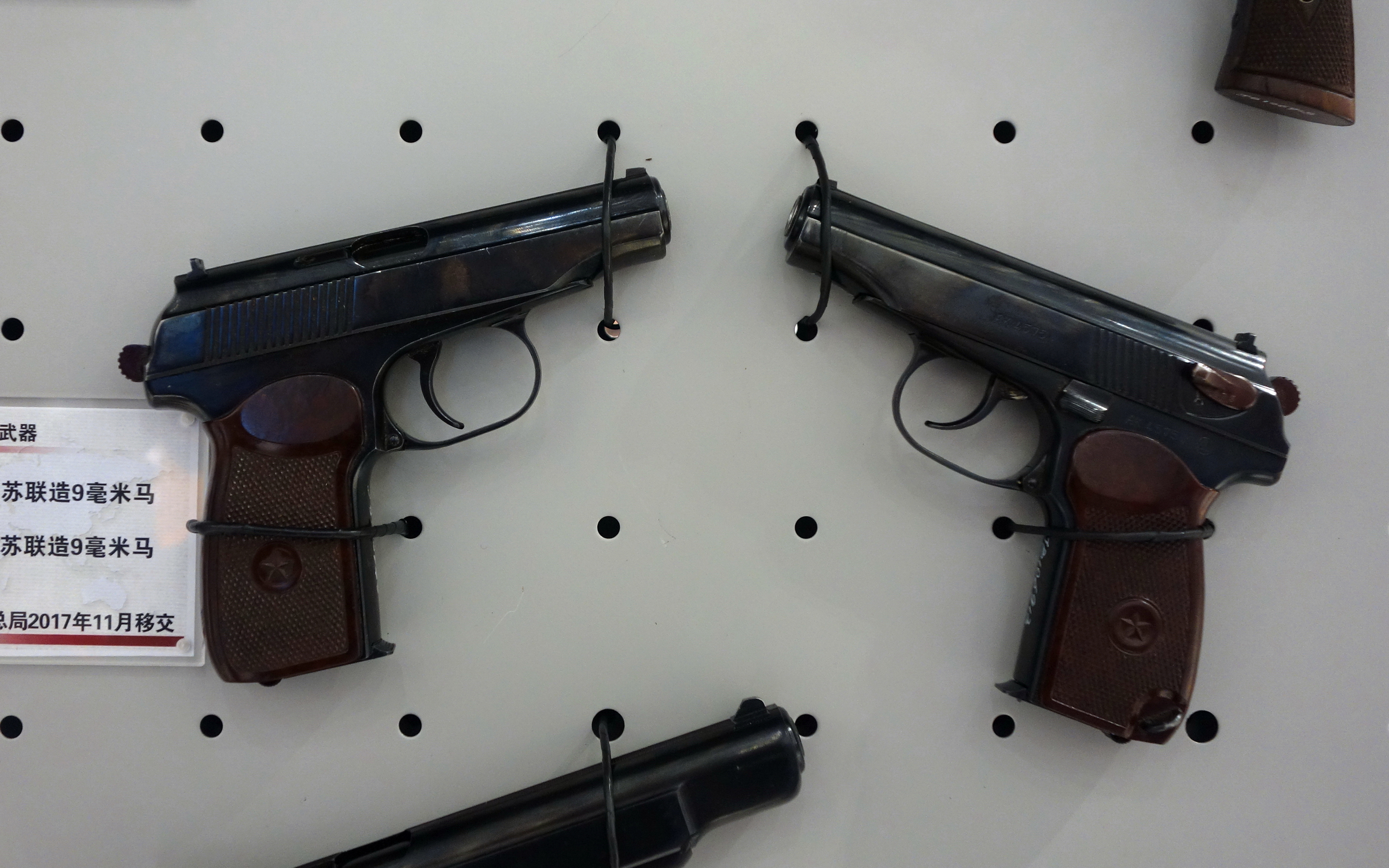
- The Type 59 pistol was identical to the early Makarov pistol
- Type: Semi-automatic pistol
- Place of origin: China

Service history
- In service: 1959–present
- Used by: See Users
- Wars: Vietnam War

Production history
- Designer: Nikolay Makarov
- Manufacturer: Factory 626
- Produced: 1959–present
- Variants: See Variants

Specifications
- Cartridge: 9×18mm Makarov.32 ACP.380 ACP
- Action: Blowback
- Effective firing range: 50 m
- Feed system: 8-round detachable box magazine
- Sights: Front blade, rear notch 156 mm (6.1 in) sight radius

The Type 59 (simplified Chinese: 59式手枪; traditional Chinese: 59式手槍) is the Chinese copy of the Soviet Makarov pistol. It's also known as the "Red Star" pistol (Traditional Chinese: 紅星手槍, Simplified Chinese: 红星手枪).

== History ==
The Marakov was adopted as the replacement of the Type 52, the copy of the East German P1001 pistol, itself a copy of the Walther PP; as well as partial replacement of the Type 51 and Type 54, copies of the Tokarev TT-33.

The Type 59 was first produced at Factory 626 in Bei'an, Heilongjiang Province with trials conducted. The quality of the later copies, however, are poor as Soviet technicians were withdrawn from China during the Sino-Soviet split.

=== Operational Use ===
The Type 59 was used as one of the standard sidearms in the People’s Liberation Army, alongside the Type 51 and Type 54. They were used in the Vietnam War.

Though the QSZ-92 (Type 92) has supplemented the Type 59 in the army, the weapon is still in service in some of the Chinese armed forces (such as the People's Armed Police and some People's Liberation Army troops).

== Design ==
Type 59 pistols come with minor cosmetic differences (i.e. the width of the slide's sight rail and configuration of the safety lever).

The military version was produced from 1959 to 1963 in Factory 626, and featured a characteristic shield embossed with 5 stars on the grip shell. They have 10 grasping serrations on the left side of the slide and 17 serrations on the right side, the same as the early Russian versions (The late versions have 13 slide serrations on both sides).

Some Type 59s with "八一" (lit. 'August 1st') engravings are made as gifts.

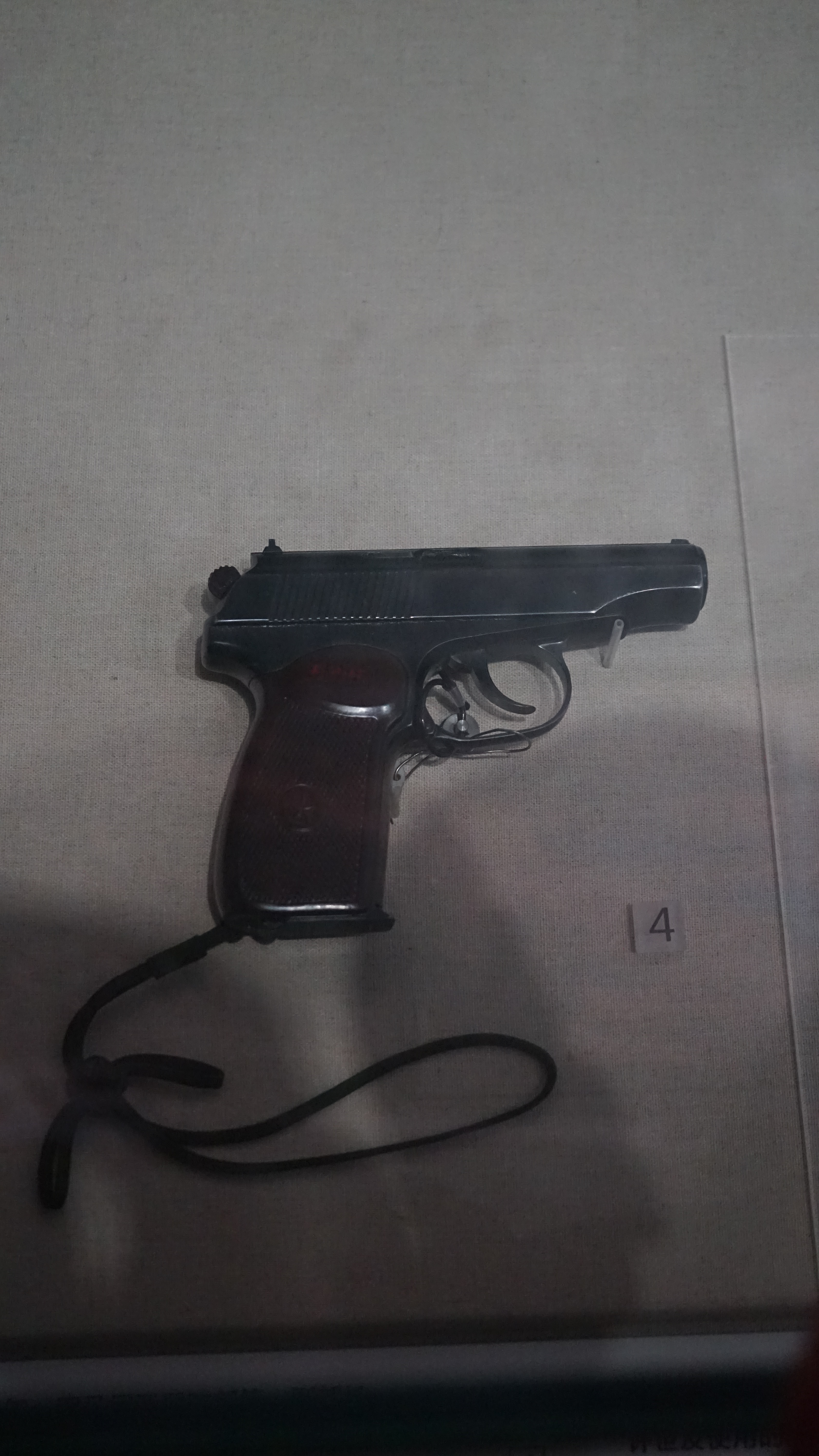
The Makarov pistol used by Colonel General Xu Shiyou.

== Variants ==
=== Norinco M59 ===
Civilian Type 59 variant for export purposes, available in both 9x18mm, .32 ACP (NP 39) and .380 ACP (NP 19) calibres.

=== SN9 ===
The Type 59 has been produced in Vietnam as the K-59 (Vietnamese: Súng ngắn K-59, lit. 'Type 59 handgun') with K meaning "type" (Vietnamese: Kiểu) and SN9 as its industrial name.

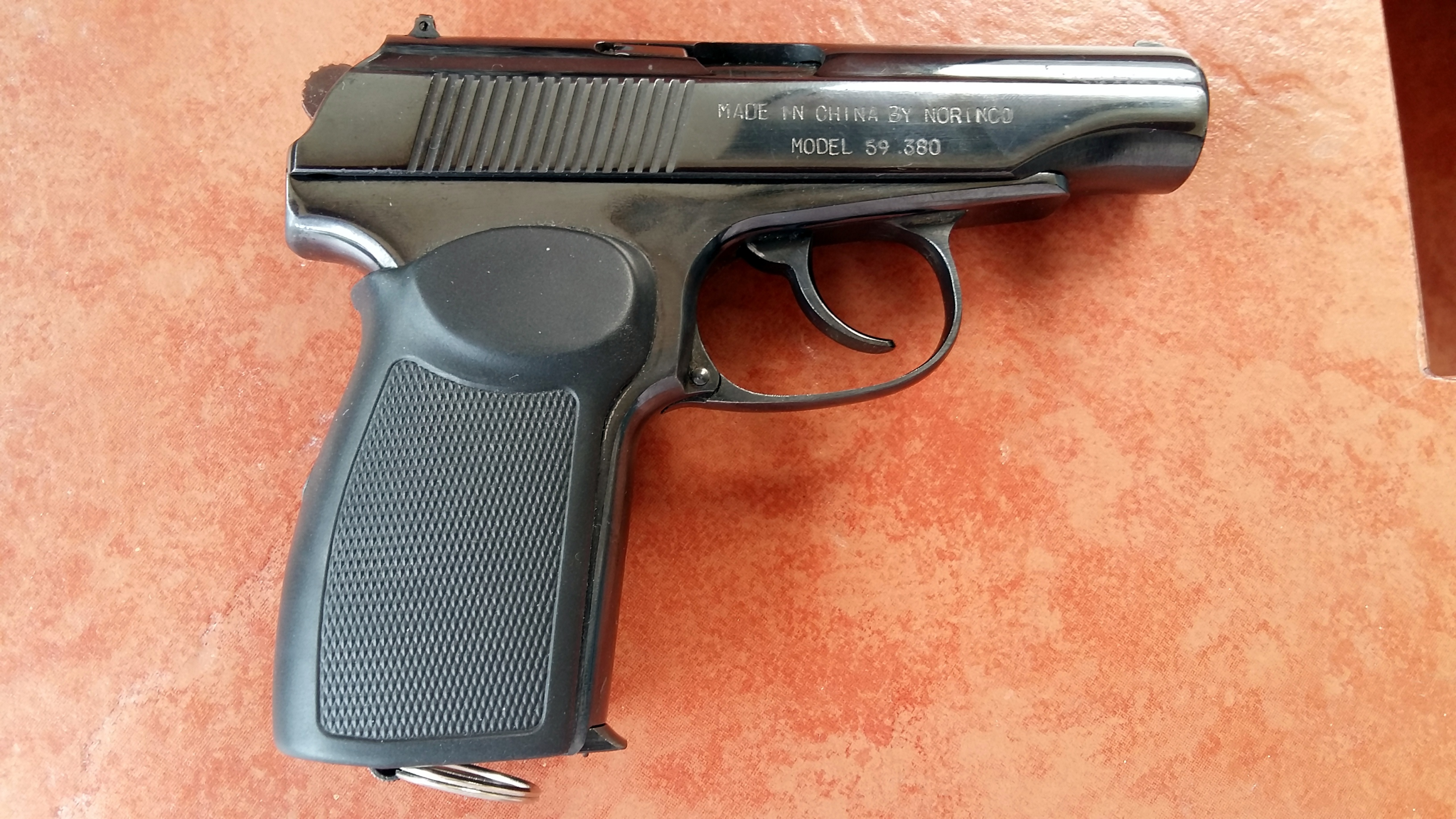
Norinco M59

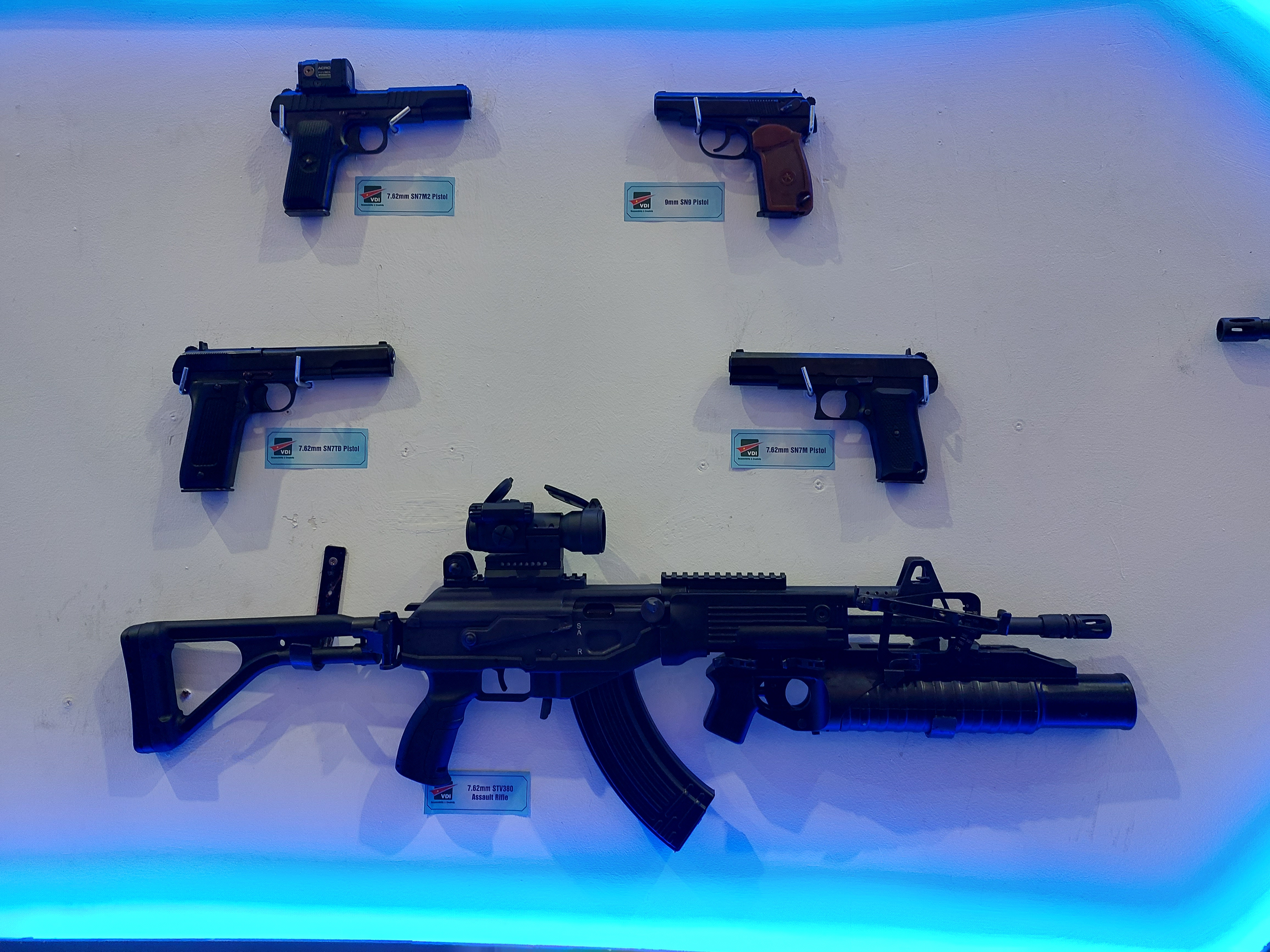
A SN9 pistol at the upper right corner.

== Users ==
- People's Republic of China: Known to be used by the People's Liberation Army and the Ministry of Public Security (China).
- Vietnam: Known to be used by the People's Army of Vietnam during the Vietnam War.

== Bibliography ==
- Jones, Richard D.; Ness, Leland S., eds. (2010). Jane's Infantry Weapons 2010-2011. Jane's Publishing. ISBN 978-0710629081.
- Kokalis, Peter (2001). Weapons Tests and Evaluations: The Best of "Soldier of Fortune". Boulder, Colorado: Paladin Press. ISBN 978-1-58160-122-0. OCLC 49695650.
- Rottman, Gordon (2012). North Vietnamese Army Soldier 1958–75. Osprey Publishing. ISBN 978-1846038679.
- Thompson, Leroy (2022). Soviet Pistols: Tokarev, Makarov, Stechkin and Others. Osprey Publishing. ISBN 978-1472853493.+
