= NRP9 Police Revolver =

Norinco NRP9
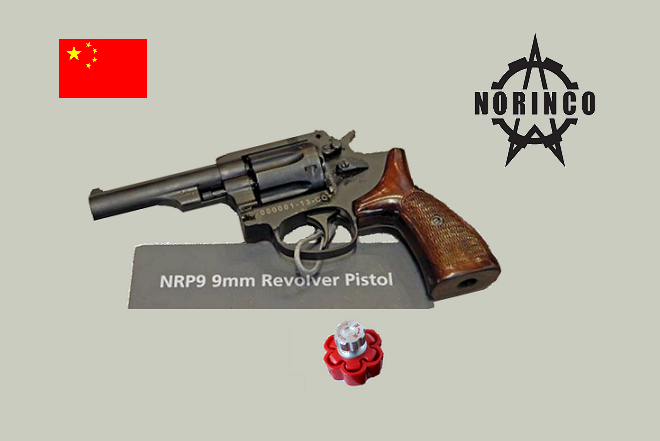
- Norinco NRP9
- Type: Revolver
- Place of origin: China

Service history
- In service: 2014–present: Police officers

Production history
- Designer: Xian Ai（艾西安）
- Manufacturer: China North Industries Group Corporation (Norinco)

Specifications
- Mass: 1 kg (2.2 lb)
- Length: 236 mm (9.3 in)
- Barrel length: 102 mm (4.0 in)
- Cartridge: 9mm/.38 caliber
- Action: Double-action/single-action
- Effective firing range: 50 m (160 ft)
- Feed system: 6-Round swing out cylinder

The Norinco NRP9 was introduced at IWA in 2014. It is a double-action revolver with a transfer bar and external manual safety. The NRP9 is chambered in a proprietary cartridge similar to .38 S&W, which is designed to prevent unauthorized criminal use.
