= Type 67 (silenced pistol) =

Semi-automatic pistol

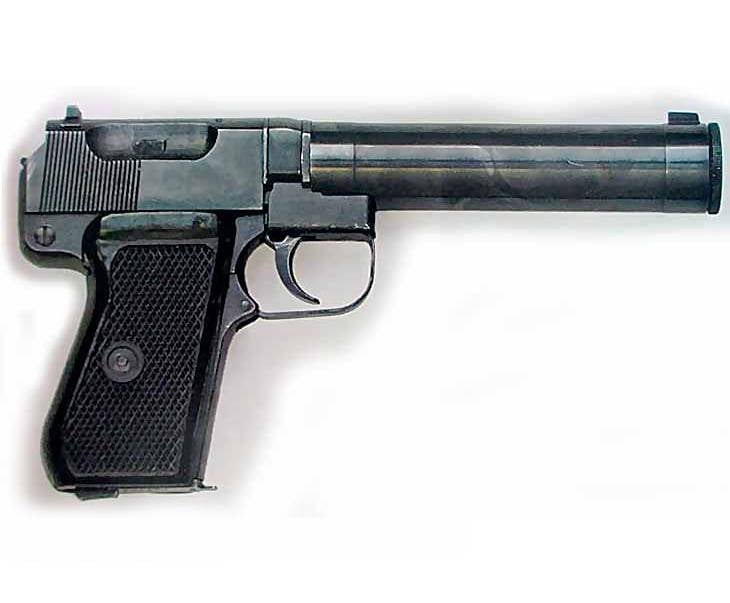
- Type 67 pistol
- Type: semi-automatic pistol, silenced
- Place of origin: China

Service history
- Used by: People's Liberation Army

Production history
- Manufacturer: Norinco
- Produced: 1967 - at least 2000

Specifications
- Mass: 1,050 g (2.31 lb)
- Length: 226.0 mm (8.90 in)
- Barrel length: 89.0 mm (3.50 in)
- Cartridge: 7.62×17mm Type 64 rimless
- Action: Blowback, semi-automatic
- Muzzle velocity: 230–250 m/s (755–820 ft/s), potentially 310 m/s (1,017 ft/s)
- Feed system: 9-round detachable single column box magazine

The Type 67 (aka "Type 67 silenced pistol") is a Chinese semi-automatic pistol with an integrated sound suppressor. The gun is the successor to the Type 64 silenced pistol.

== Design ==
Where the Type 64 had the suppressor bulging out under the barrel and in front of the trigger guard, the Type 67 features a more conventional design with the suppressor resembling a tube all around the barrel. The Type 67 is chambered for a low-powered 7.62×17mm Type 64 rimless cartridge, which makes it incompatible with the .32 ACP or 7.65×17mm rimless cartridge of the Type 64.
