= Type 54 pistol =

Type 54
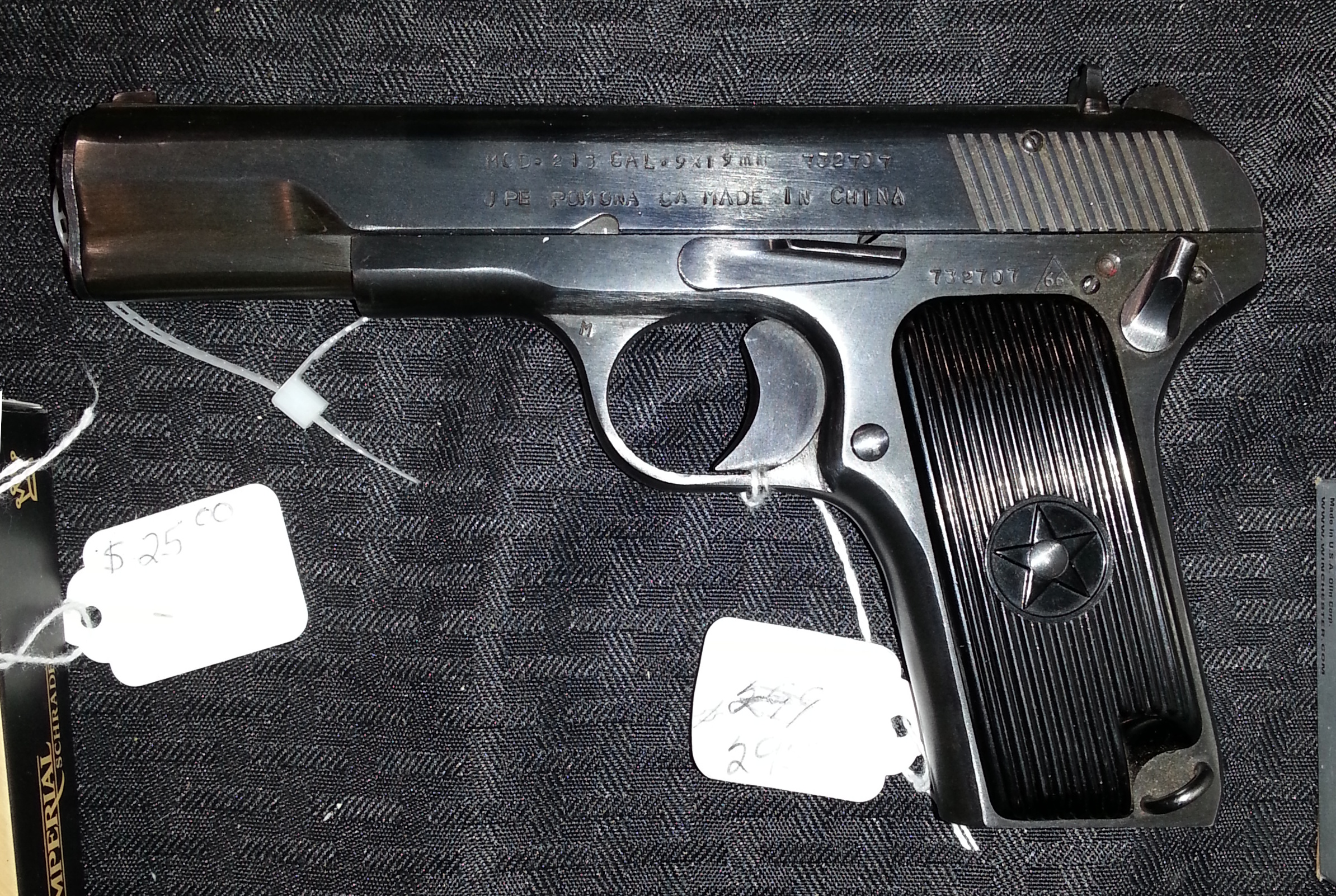
- The export version of Type 54-1.
- Type: Semi-automatic pistol
- Place of origin: China

Service history
- In service: 1954–present
- Used by: See Operators
- Wars: Sino-Indian War; Vietnam War; Indo-Pakistan war of 1971; Laotian Civil War; Cambodian Civil War; Cambodian-Vietnamese War; Rhodesian Bush War; Sino-Vietnamese War; Sri Lankan Civil War; Somali Civil War; Kargil war 2025 Cambodia‒Thailand conflict

Production history
- Designer: Norinco
- Designed: 1954
- Manufacturer: Norinco
- Produced: 1954–present
- Variants: See Variants

Specifications
- Mass: 890 g (31 oz)
- Length: 195 mm (7.7 in)
- Barrel length: 116 mm (4.6 in)
- Height: 134 mm (5.3 in)
- Cartridge: 7.62×25mm.38 Super; 9×19mm Parabellum
- Action: Short recoil actuated, locked breech, single action, semi-auto
- Muzzle velocity: 420 m/s (1,378 ft/s)
- Effective firing range: 50 m
- Feed system: 7 and 8 -round detachable box magazine, 14-round box magazine (213A/B)
- Sights: Front blade, rear notch 156 mm (6.1 in) sight radius

The Type 54 (simplified Chinese: 54式手枪; traditional Chinese: 54式手槍) is Chinese semi-automatic pistol used extensively by the People's Liberation Army and the People's Armed Police. It is a domestically manufactured copy of the Soviet Tokarev TT-33 pistol.

== History ==
China adopted the Type 51, a local TT-33 copy, as their standard pistol after WWII. The Type 51 was virtually identical to the TT-33, except for the Chinese markings on the left rear of the frame or on the top of the slide. According to Thompson, the barrels aren't chrome-lined.

Over 235,000 Type 51 pistols were produced between 1951 and 1954.

The Type 51 was first adopted in 1951 and produced in Shenyang's Factory 66 using both Soviet and Chinese-made parts. In 1954, after approximately 250,000 pistols were manufactured, the designation was changed to Type 54 and the pistol used exclusively indigenous components.

Newer variants like the WQ213B54, 213-A and NT04, with double stacked magazines, have been developed.

== Design ==
The Type 54 is the improved version of the Type 51 (Chinese TT-33 copy) produced after the Korean War. The Type 54 magazine is interchangeable with that of the Russian TT-33. The pistol is commonly available in 7.62×25mm caliber, although some variants have been made in 9×19mm Parabellum.

The Type 54 pistol is also known colloquially as "Black Star pistol" (Traditional Chinese:黑星手槍, Simplified Chinese: 黑星手枪) due to the all-black surface finishing and the decorative five-pointed star engraved on the grip panel.

== Variants ==
Norinco, the People's Liberation Army's state weapons manufacturer in China, still manufactures a commercial variant of the Tokarev pistol chambered in the more common 9×19mm Parabellum round, known as the Tokarev Model 213, as well as in the original 7.62×25mm caliber.

=== Tokarev Model 213 ===
The Tokarev Model 213 features a safety catch, which was absent on Soviet-produced TT-33 handguns. Furthermore, the Model 213 features the thin slide grip grooves, as opposed to the original Russian wide-types.

The 9×19mm model is featured with a magazine well block mounted in the rear of the magazine well to accept 9×19mm-type magazines without frame modification.

==== Model 213A ====
Model 213 variant with a 14-round box magazine.

==== Model 213B ====
Model 213 variant with a wrap-around grip to improve ergonomics.

=== M20 ===
The M20 was a clandestine version of the Type 54 made without factory markings to conceal the weapon's origins.

=== TU-90 ===
Also known as the NP-10 or Model 213-B.

Improved Model 213 variant similar to the Hungarian-designed and manufactured, Egyptian contracted Tokagypt 58 of the 1950s.

Construction is primarily of forged and machined steel, with a matte blued finish. The grips are of wrap-around rubber ribbed on the side to improve ergonomics.

=== NP-10 ===
Export model with interchangeable barrels. It can fire 7.62×25mm, 9×19mm, and .38 Super cartridges.

=== NP-15 ===
Export 9×19mm model with three white dot sights and a black rubber grip.

=== NP-17 ===
Export target-shooting 9×19mm pistol with a 116 mm (4.6 in) barrel and muzzle brake.

=== Foreign production ===
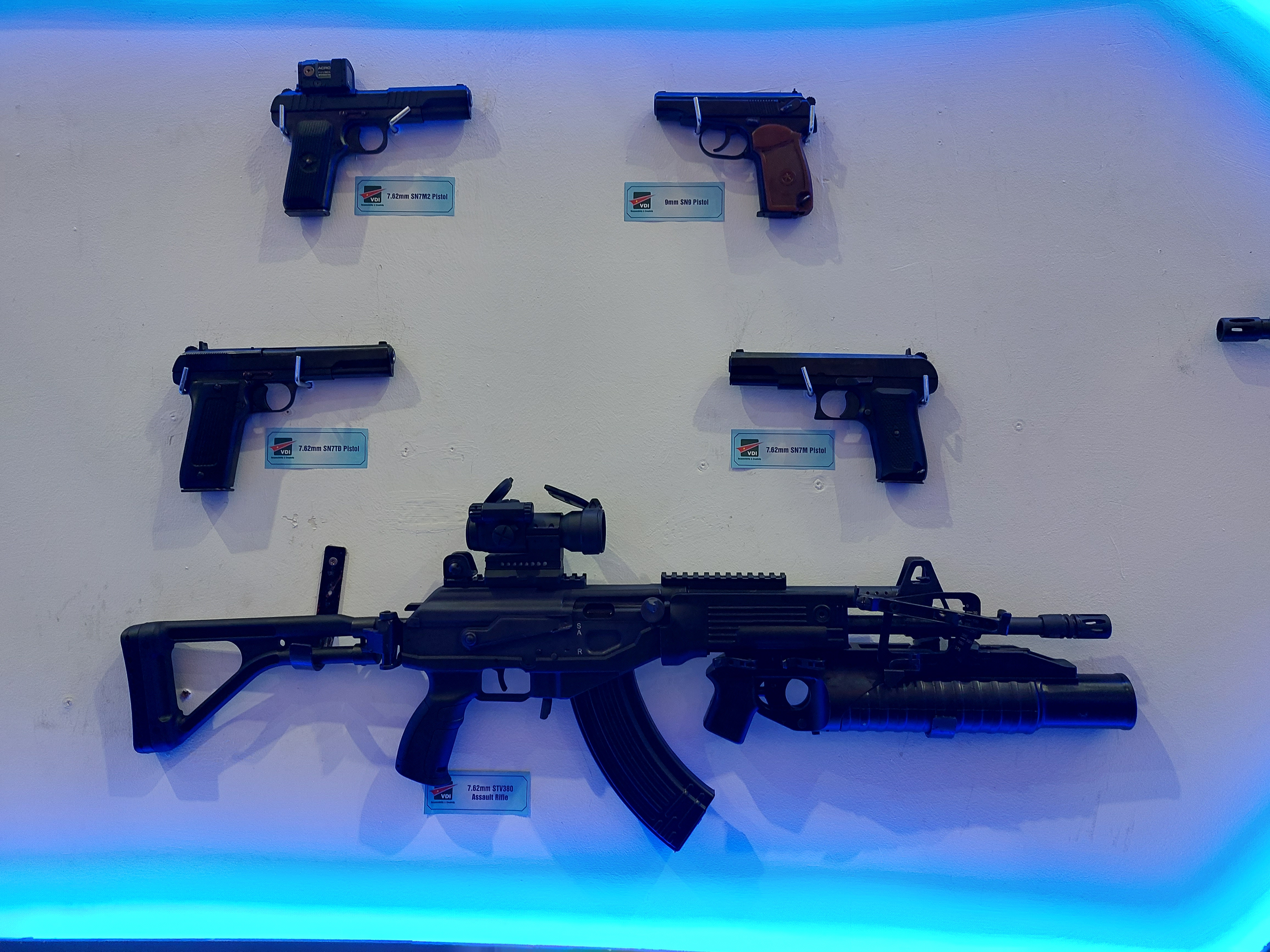
Vietnamese Tokarev pistols on display.

==== K-54VN ====
Vietnamese Type 54 copy made by Z111 Factory. Replaces and refurbishes the aging K-54 pistols in service.

==== K14-VN ====
Updated Vietnamese K54 variant. Made by Factory Z111.

Equipped with a wider grip to incorporate a 14-round double stack magazine, based on the Tokarev Model 213.

Research and development started in 2001. The K14-VN began to see service with PAVN forces on May 10, 2014.

== Adoption ==
=== China ===
The Type 54 was used as one of the standard sidearms used by the People's Liberation Army, alongside the Type 59, Type 64 and Type 77.

Though the QSZ-92 (Type 92) has supplemented the Type 54 in the Army, the weapon is still in service in some of the Chinese armed forces (such as the People's Armed Police and some People's Liberation Army troops) today.

=== Vietnam ===
The Vietnamese used the Type 54 during the Vietnam War, as the K-54 (Vietnamese: Súng ngắn K-54, lit. 'Type 54 handgun') with K meaning "type" (Vietnamese: Kiểu). The industry name for the regular K54 and the K14-VN is known as SN7M and the SN7TD.

=== Criminal activities ===
Chinese-made Tokarev-pattern pistols, including the Type 54, became associated with organized crime in Japan during the late 1980s and early 1990s. The Japanese National Police Agency (NPA) reported that seizures of Tokarev-type pistols from organized crime groups increased after they were first recorded in 1988. In 1991, police seized 265 such pistols from organized crime groups, representing 27.8% of their handgun seizures. Another 211 were seized in 1992, accounting for 19.7% of the total. The NPA reported that smuggled Tokarev-type pistols were widely circulating among Japanese organized crime groups.

The illegal trade included large-scale smuggling operations. In 1990, members of an organized crime group smuggled approximately 800 handguns from China into Japan aboard a fishing vessel, including Chinese-made Tokarev-type pistols. A subsequent investigation recovered 97 handguns. In 1991, police seized 20 Tokarev-type pistols and 400 cartridges from a vehicle associated with the Yamaguchi-gumi. In 1993, police recovered another five Tokarev-type pistols and approximately 1,000 cartridges following an investigation involving a Yamaguchi-gumi affiliate.

In May 1993, a Japanese government representative stated before the House of Representatives that almost all Tokarev-type pistols previously seized in Japan were Chinese-made. However, authorities had not established whether the firearms had been diverted directly from the Chinese military, noting that China had also exported or supplied such weapons to other countries.

Tokarev-type pistol seizures subsequently declined. The NPA recorded 303 Chinese-made Tokarev-type pistols among nationwide handgun seizures in 1994, representing 17.3% of genuine handguns seized that year. By 2024, nationwide police statistics recorded three Tokarev-type pistols. These statistics encompass Tokarev-pattern firearms generally and do not identify how many were specifically Type 54 pistols.

== Operators ==
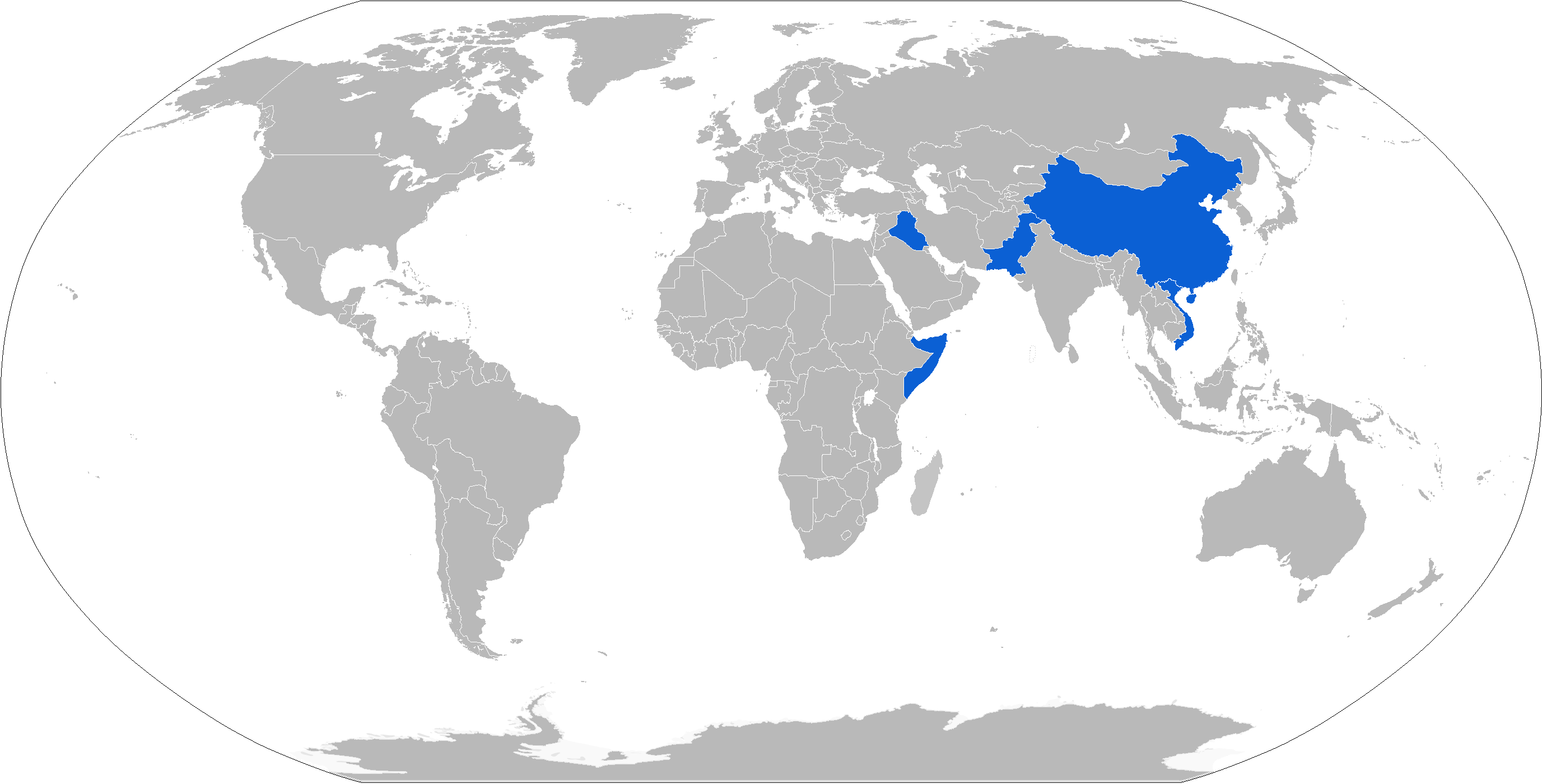
A map with Type 54 operators in blue.

- Bangladesh
- China
- Iraq: Type 51 pistols used.
- Pakistan
- Somaliland
- Vietnam: Used by the PAVN and Viet Cong.

=== Non-State Actors ===
- Inkatha Freedom Party
- (Novorossiya (confederation)) Russian separatist forces in Ukraine: At least one Type 54 documented to use.

== Bibliography ==
- Jones, Richard D; Ness, Leland S, eds. (2010). Jane's Infantry Weapons 2010−2011 (36th ed.). Jane's Information Group. ISBN 978-0-7106-2908-1.
- Thompson, Leroy (2022). Soviet Pistols: Tokarev, Makarov, Stechkin and others. Bloomsbury Publishing. ISBN 9781472853493.
