= Type 64 (silenced pistol) =

Chinese silenced semi-automatic pistol

Type 64 Silenced Pistol
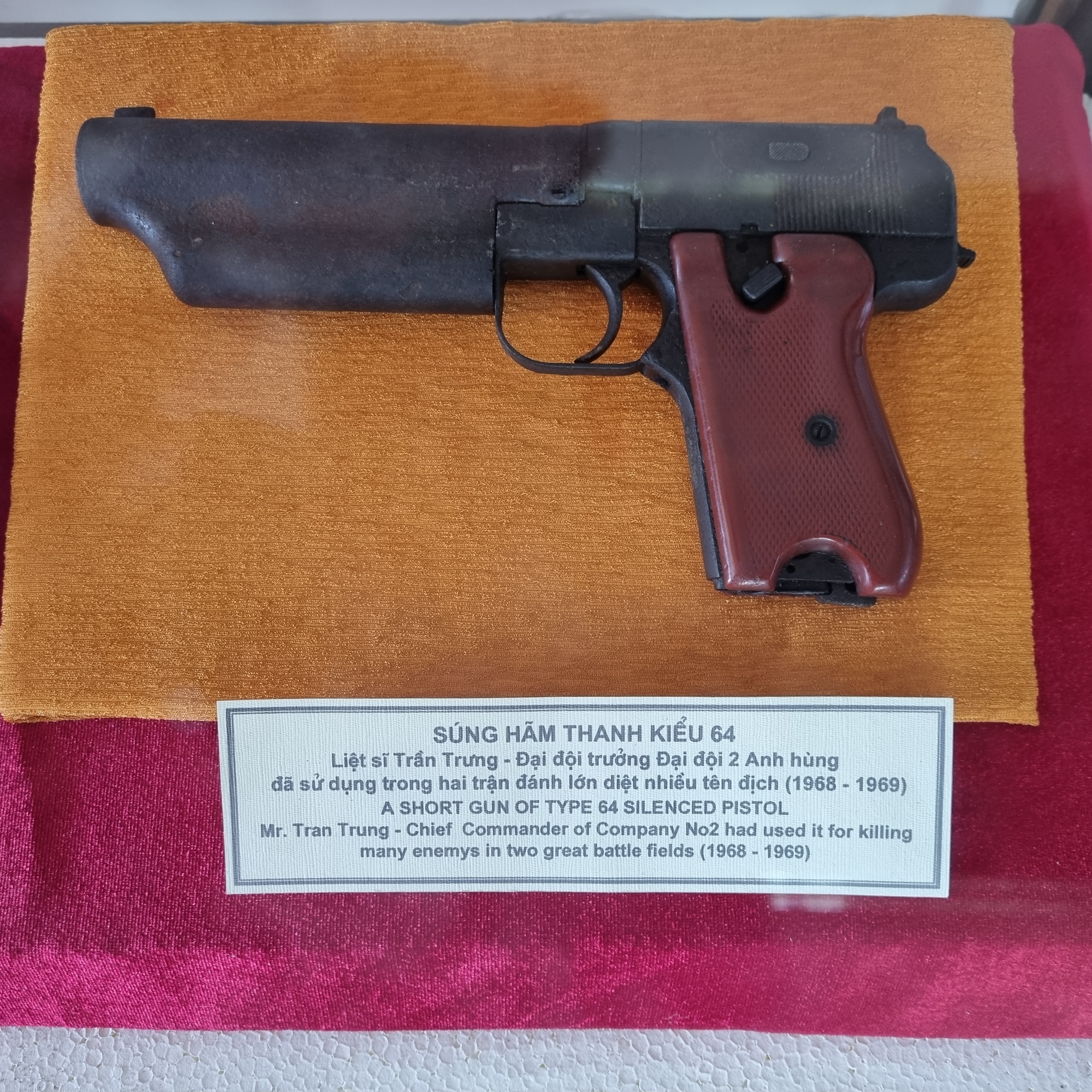
- Type 64 silenced pistol at Hoi An Museum
- Type: Semi-automatic pistol, integrally suppressed
- Place of origin: China

Service history
- In service: Since 1964
- Used by: People's Liberation Army; People's Army of Vietnam; Viet Cong
- Wars: Vietnam War

Production history
- Manufacturer: Norinco
- Produced: Since 1964

Specifications
- Mass: 1,880 g (4.14 lb)
- Length: 222.0 mm (8.74 in)
- Barrel length: 95.0 mm (3.74 in)
- Cartridge: 7.65×17mm rimless ball
- Action: Single-action or blowback (user-selectable)
- Feed system: 9-round detachable box magazine

The Type 64 (a.k.a. "Type 64 silenced pistol") is a Chinese semi-automatic pistol with an integrated sound suppressor. The Type 64 was succeeded by the Type 67. The gun is chambered in the custom-designed Type 64 7.65×17mm rimless cartridges, which are not identical to the 7.65×17mm.

== Design ==
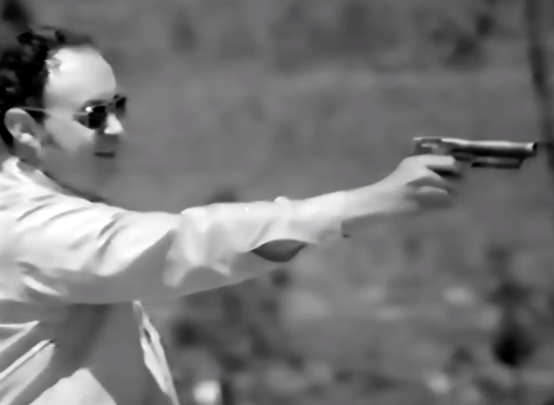
Type 64 silent pistol handed by Harold Johnson of the Foreign Science and Technology Center, during a demonstration

The pistol is a simple blowback pistol; however, using a toggle switch on the breech block, the user can make the pistol operate in single-action mode, requiring manual operation of the slide. Uniquely for a blowback pistol, it features a rotating bolt with locking lugs; this feature is to allow for the selection of semi-automatic or manual operation. When the toggle is set in the semi-automatic position, the bolt is held in the unlocked position, allowing the gun to cycle; when it is set in the manual operation position, the bolt follows the track in the breech block, which locks the bolt in the forward position. Because it is a blowback-operated pistol, the bolt cannot be unlocked by firing, thus locking the slide/breech block. However, the user can still manually cycle the weapon by racking the slide, as racking the slide will unlock the bolt and allow it to move.

The suppressor is a two-stage suppressor: it has a baffle system in line with the barrel, and a secondary chamber under the barrel. This secondary chamber is split in half, with the upper half being a simple expansion chamber for the first stage while the bottom half has a port from after (i.e., closer to the muzzle) the primary baffles to another mesh baffle system. This makes the gun extremely quiet, especially with a lower-powered cartridge like 7.65×17mm rimless.
