= Type 77 pistol =

Type 77
- Type: Semi-automatic pistol
- Place of origin: China

Service history
- In service: 1981–present

Production history
- Designer: Jinan Military Region Arsenal 316
- Designed: 1976–1981
- Manufacturer: China North Industries Corporation
- Produced: 1981–present
- Variants: M-77, M-77B, NP-20, NP-24, NP-24A

Specifications
- Mass: Type 77: 500 g (18 oz); M-77B: 1,000 g (35 oz)
- Length: Type 77: 148 mm (5.8 in); M-77B: 190 mm (7.5 in)
- Barrel length: Type 77: 86.5 mm (3.4 in); M-77B: 127 mm (5.0 in)
- Cartridge: Type 77: 7.62×17mm Type 64; Type 77B: 9×19mm Parabellum
- Action: Gas-delayed blowback
- Rate of fire: Semi-automatic
- Muzzle velocity: 318 m/s (1,043 ft/s)
- Effective firing range: Sights fixed for 50 m
- Feed system: Type 77: 7-round box magazine Type 77B: 9 or 15-round box magazine
- Sights: Rear notch and front blade

The Type 77 (Chinese: 77式手枪; pinyin: 77 shì shǒu qiāng; lit. 'Type 77 handgun') is a 7.62×17 mm Type 64 caliber semi-automatic pistol in service with all branches of the People's Liberation Army (PLA) of the People's Republic of China, People's Armed Police and various Chinese police forces. The Type 77 has been the main sidearm of the PLA for over two decades and is slowly being phased out by the QSZ-92 pistol in both military and police service but is still in widespread use across the country amongst second line military units and provincial police forces. Beginning in 1990, several variants of the Type 77 were developed for the international market.

== History ==
Following the successful development of the Type 64 pistol and the silenced Type 64 and Type 67 pistols, the Jinan Military Region Ordnance Factory began development of a self-defense weapon for officers, armed police and public security police in 1976 and by 1978 a design for the new side arm had been selected. In 1981 the design had been finalized for production and was designated as the Type 77.

== Design details ==
The Type 77 pistol is a compact, pocket-sized, blowback-operated handgun that fires the indigenously developed 7.62×17mm Type 64 pistol round, which was originally created for the Type 64 pistol.

=== Operation ===
The Type 77 utilizes a striker-fired single action firing mechanism and is carried with a loaded magazine and empty chamber.

A lanyard ring is located at the bottom of the grip. The frame is covered by a one-piece plastic wrap-around grip retained by a single screw. The grip is marked with a single five-pointed star in a circle on each side.

The most unusual feature of the Type 77 is the use of an obscure system of operation, developed in the early 20th century by firearms designer, Witold Chylewski, and first manufactured under Louis Schmeisser and later Hugo Schmeisser's Theodor Bergmann Waffenfabrik, a German arms manufacturing company.

This German "Einhand" system allows the user to single-handedly chamber a cartridge by pulling the trigger guard back, which is connected to the slide. This pulling action will retract the slide back against the return spring.

When the trigger guard is released, the slide will return and chamber the cartridge almost instantaneously. The chamber is fluted to reduce slide recoil, this reduces gas pressure acting on the base of the cartridge case. The trigger is then pulled to fire in single-action and the trigger guard is then automatically locked forward as to not strain the index finger during normal firing.

An advantage of this system is that misfired cartridges can be quickly discharged with only one hand. If one prefers to carry with a loaded chamber, a traditional, manual safety exists above the left grip panel on the frame.

=== Ergonomics ===
The Type 77 has both a forward blade front sight with a slight taper and a rear, fixed notch.

The magazine seems to be derived from the Czechoslovak vz. 52 and is a single-stacked box magazine that carries seven rounds and is released by a button on the left side of the frame on the trigger guard below the actual trigger.

=== Accessories ===
Recently, China has begun importing the Israeli CornerShot gun system for the People's Armed Police, and at the same time, began developing its own modifications of the weapon for the Type 79 submachine gun.

The CornerShot Type 79 has been slightly modified to house the Cornershot system and most notably mounts a Type 77 pistol in a special, rotating mount, placed under the barrel that also houses a tactical flashlight.

This rotating mount allows the user to fire the pistol and the submachine gun independently of each other.

In addition the entire barrel of the Type 79 can also turn left or right, with the user able to see around corners thanks to a small camera attached to a side-mounted LCD screen.

== Variants ==
There are five variants of the Type 77 pistol, three of which (NP-20, NP-24 and NP-24A) are based on the M-77B variant. All variants of the Type 77 except the Type 77-1 are for export only and not in use domestically in China, neither with military nor with police.

=== M-77 ===
The M-77 (Model 77) is an exact copy of the Type 77, made by Norinco. It is meant for export, rather than internal use.

==== M-77B ====
The M-77B (Model 77B) is a highly modified variant of the Type 77 pistol and was developed in 1991.

It is often marketed as a "Chinese military" pistol, regardless of the fact that it is not in fact used by the People's Liberation Army.

The M-77B is a single-action pistol and weighs twice as much as the original Type 77 and is over forty millimeters longer. The frame and slide are made from forged carbon steel and the grip panels are of polymer construction, which are placed on a curved backstrap grip.

The M-77B is designed to fire the 9×19mm Parabellum round. As the Parabellum round is much more powerful than the 7.62×17mm Type 64, the M-77B uses a gas-delayed blowback action to reduce recoil and has a fixed barrel. The gas cylinder is located under the barrel and the gas piston is connected to the slide.

The M-77B retains the Type 77's unique "trigger guard cocking system". There is a thumb and a magazine safety and a fixed, forward, and adjustable three-dot rear sights. The magazine uses a single stacked nine-round magazine.

=== NP-20 ===
The NP-20 pistol is a variant of the M-77B developed in 1993. The pistol is also made from forged steel construction.

The NP-20 series is often marketed as a 'Chinese Police' but the NP-20 series is not in use with any police service or People's Armed Police unit in China.

The only difference between the M-77B and the NP-20 is the removal of the 'trigger guard cocking system' on the latter.

=== NP-24 ===
The NP-24 pistol (sometimes referred to as the M-77B2) is another variant of the M-77B developed in 1995.

The difference between the M-77B and the NP-24 is the removal of the 'trigger guard cocking system' and replacement of the original nine-round magazine with a double-stacked fifteen-round magazine.

==== NP-24A ====
The NP-24A pistol is a variant of the NP-24 pistol developed in 1998 and is made from a high-quality aluminum alloy.

The NP24A is 85 g lighter than the NP24.

=== Type 77-1 ===
The Type 77-1 is a variant of the Type 77 pistol which is designed for export and internal use. The Type 77-1 pistol was introduced in 1988 and differs from the Type 77 due to its strengthened grip and an eight-round magazine capacity. Very little information has been released on this variant.

== Operators ==
- China
- Libya

== See also ==
- List of delayed blowback firearms
- List of semi-automatic pistols
- Bayard 1908
- JO.LO.AR.
- Krag–Jørgensen pistol
- Walther PP
- P-83 Wanad
