= Type 64 pistol =

Chinese semi-automatic pistol

Type 64 Pistol
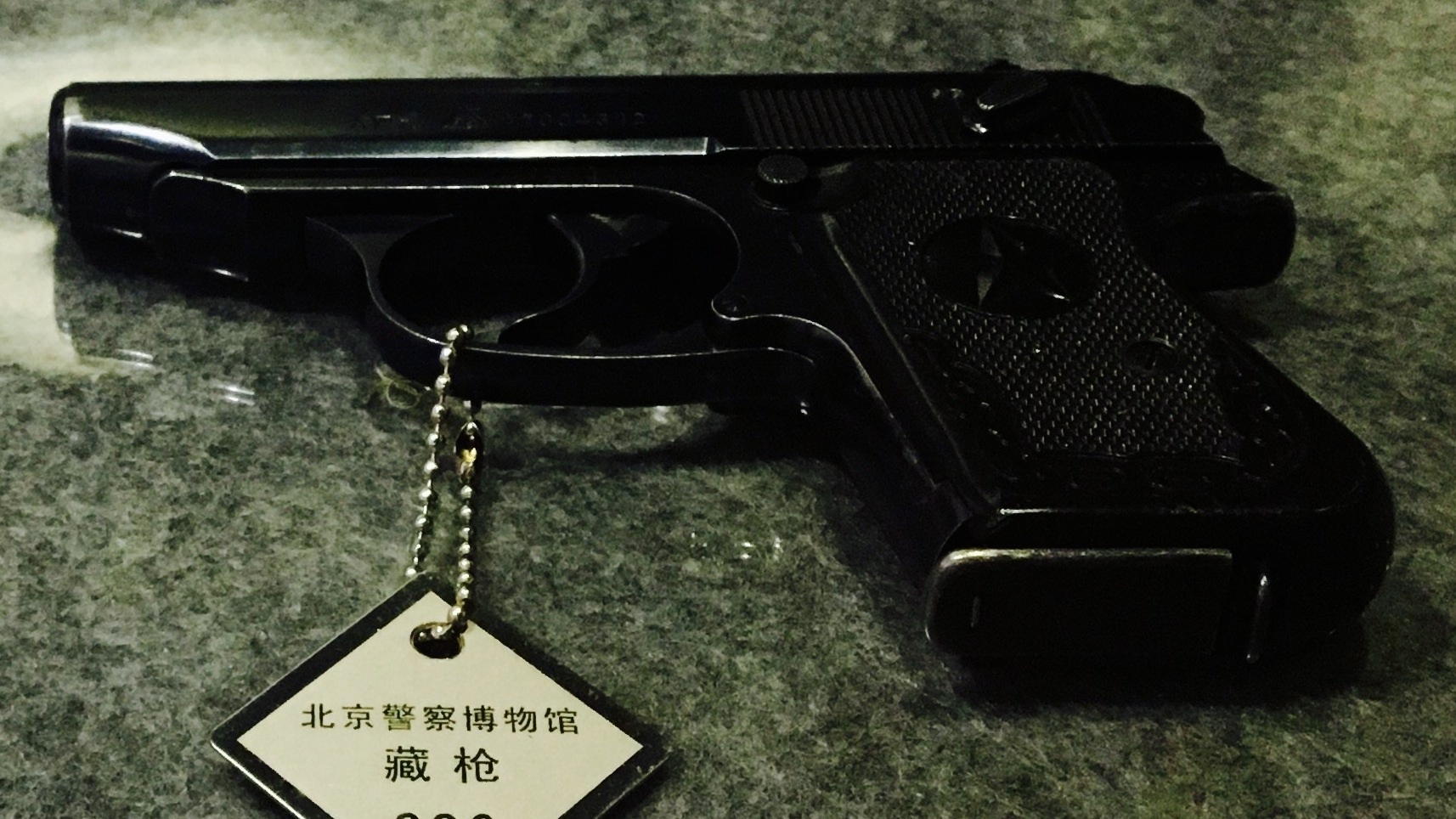
- Type 64 pistol in the Beijing Police Museum
- Type: Semi-automatic pistol
- Place of origin: China

Production history
- Designed: 1960-1964
- Manufacturer: China North Industries Group
- Produced: 1980–present
- Variants: M-64

Specifications
- Mass: 530 g (19 oz)
- Length: 153 mm (6.0 in)
- Barrel length: 86.5 mm (3.41 in)
- Cartridge: 7.62×17mm Type 64
- Action: Straight Blowback, open bolt
- Rate of fire: 30 rounds/min
- Muzzle velocity: 305-315 m/s
- Effective firing range: 50m
- Feed system: 7-round box magazine
- Sights: Fixed iron sights, rear notch and front blade

The Type 64 pistol (Chinese: 64式手枪; pinyin: 64 shì shǒuqiāng; lit. 'Type 64 handgun') is a semi-automatic pistol formerly in service with the People's Liberation Army (PLA) and still in service with some Chinese police forces. The Type 64 pistol was the first firearm to be indigenously developed by the People's Republic of China and was first only issued to high-ranking military officers and officials, but has since been distributed throughout the PLA. The Type 64 pistol has subsequently been distributed to various People's Armed Police and civilian police forces.

The Type 64 pistol should not be confused with the unrelated, but similarly named, Type 64 silent pistol (Chinese: 64式微声手枪; pinyin: 64 shì wēishēng shǒu qiāng; lit. 'Type 64 silent handgun') which can be distinguished from the Type 64 pistol, by its large, integral suppressor.

== History ==
Ever since the expulsion of the Kuomintang government, concluding the Chinese Civil War, the People's Liberation Army relied heavily upon support from the Soviet Union for supplies and weaponry. At the commencement of the post-Civil War period, the People's Republic of China and the Union of Soviet Socialist Republics cooperated heavily towards the industrialisation of China, which had experienced decades of ceaseless warfare.

During this period of Sino-Soviet friendship, Chinese factories, with the assistance of Soviet blue-prints and technical assistance, began mass-producing Soviet-designed weapons such as the Type 50 submachine gun, Type 54 pistol, Type 56 carbine and the Type 56 assault rifle.

Two such blue-prints given to China from the Soviet Union were the Walther PPK and the Makarov PM , which the Chinese manufactured under the designations Type 52 and Type 59, respectively.

Following the Sino-Soviet split of the late 1950s to the 1960s, the Soviet Union withdrew its support for the Chinese Communist Party, leaving China to develop its arms industry itself. Beginning in 1960, Chinese engineers began designing a new, indigenous pistol for military officers and police based on the Type 52 and 59 pistols.

By 1964, a final design had been developed, and was subsequently named the “Type 64 pistol” although it would take until 1980, two decades after beginning of its development, to reach production due to Mao Zedong's Cultural Revolution which consistently hampered the Type 64s development and production.

=== Operational Use ===
After its introduction in 1980, the Type 64 became the first indigenously developed firearm created by the People's Liberation Army.

Taikonauts were issued with the Type 64 for survival from Shenzhou 5 in 1999.

With the introduction of newer, more modern pistols, such as the QSZ-92 in the 1990s, the Type 64 has been slowly been phased out of PLA service and is now only used by civilian police forces, who also intend to phase out the Type 64 within the coming years with the Norinco 9mm revolver introduced in 2006.

== Design ==
The Type 64 pistol is a small, pocket-sized pistol, and was designed specifically for the parallelly developed 7.62×17 mm Type 64, a rimless pistol cartridge which is loosely based on the commonly found .32 ACP pistol round. The Type 64 pistol was the first pistol to use the 7.62×17 mm pistol round.

The Type 64 uses the PPKs straight blowback, open bolt, single action while also incorporating the PMs safety system where the operator pushes the safety lever down before firing. After the first round is discharged, the hammer is cocked; firing and cycling recocks the hammer for subsequent firing. The Type 64 is a rather small pistol and concerns around the weapon's ergonomics and accuracy during semi-automatic firing have existed since its inception.

The use of the Type 64 round has also been called into question; some believe the 7.62×17 mm round is too powerful for police work, where the objective is to capture the criminal, while others believe the round is not powerful enough to properly protect police officers.

== Variants ==
=== M-64 ===
The M-64 (Model 64) pistol is a variant of the Type 64 pistol. The two are exactly the same, other than the M-64 pistol is built for export markets, while the Type 64 is for internal use.

== Users ==
- China
- Iraq: Reportedly used Type 64s provided by China. They have Arabic inscriptions on the slide and the Iraqi flag on the grip.

== Bibliography ==
- Jones, Richard D.; Ness, Leland S., eds. (2010). Jane's Infantry Weapons 2010-2011. Jane's Publishing. ISBN 978-0710629081.
