= 5.8×21mm =

Chinese armor-piercing pistol cartridge

5.8×21mm DAP92
- Type: Handgun, submachine gun
- Place of origin: China

Service history
- Used by: China

Production history
- Designed: 1994
- Manufacturer: Norinco

Specifications
- Case type: Rimless, bottleneck
- Bullet diameter: 6.00 mm (0.236 in)
- Neck diameter: 6.57 mm (0.259 in)
- Shoulder diameter: 7.77 mm (0.306 in)
- Base diameter: 7.95 mm (0.313 in)
- Rim diameter: 7.97 mm (0.314 in)
- Rim thickness: 1.13 mm (0.044 in)
- Case length: 21.00 mm (0.827 in)
- Overall length: 32.50 mm (1.280 in)

Ballistic performance
Bullet mass/type	Velocity	Energy
46 gr (3 g) armor piercing*	479 m/s (1,570 ft/s)	335 J (247 ft⋅lbf)
46 gr (3 g) armor piercing**	518 m/s (1,700 ft/s)	420 J (310 ft⋅lbf)
- Test barrel length: Pistol* and submachine gun**

The 5.8×21mm DAP92 (Chinese: DAP92式5.8毫米普通弹; pinyin: 92 shì 5.8 háo mǐ pǔ tōng dàn, lit. 'Type 92 5.8mm standard cartridge') is a Chinese rimless, bottlenecked, centerfire cartridge designed as an armor-piercing PDW ammunition for handguns and submachine guns.

== Design ==
The cartridge was designed to replace the 7.62×25mm Tokarev chambered small arms for the People's Liberation Army, and be able to pierce soft body armour while still offering a wound as large as a standard 9×19mm Parabellum round.

This round is offered in both a standard and subsonic version. Both the QSZ-92 service pistol and the QCW-05 submachine gun are produced in this caliber as well as 9×19mm Parabellum.
