= QSZ-92 =

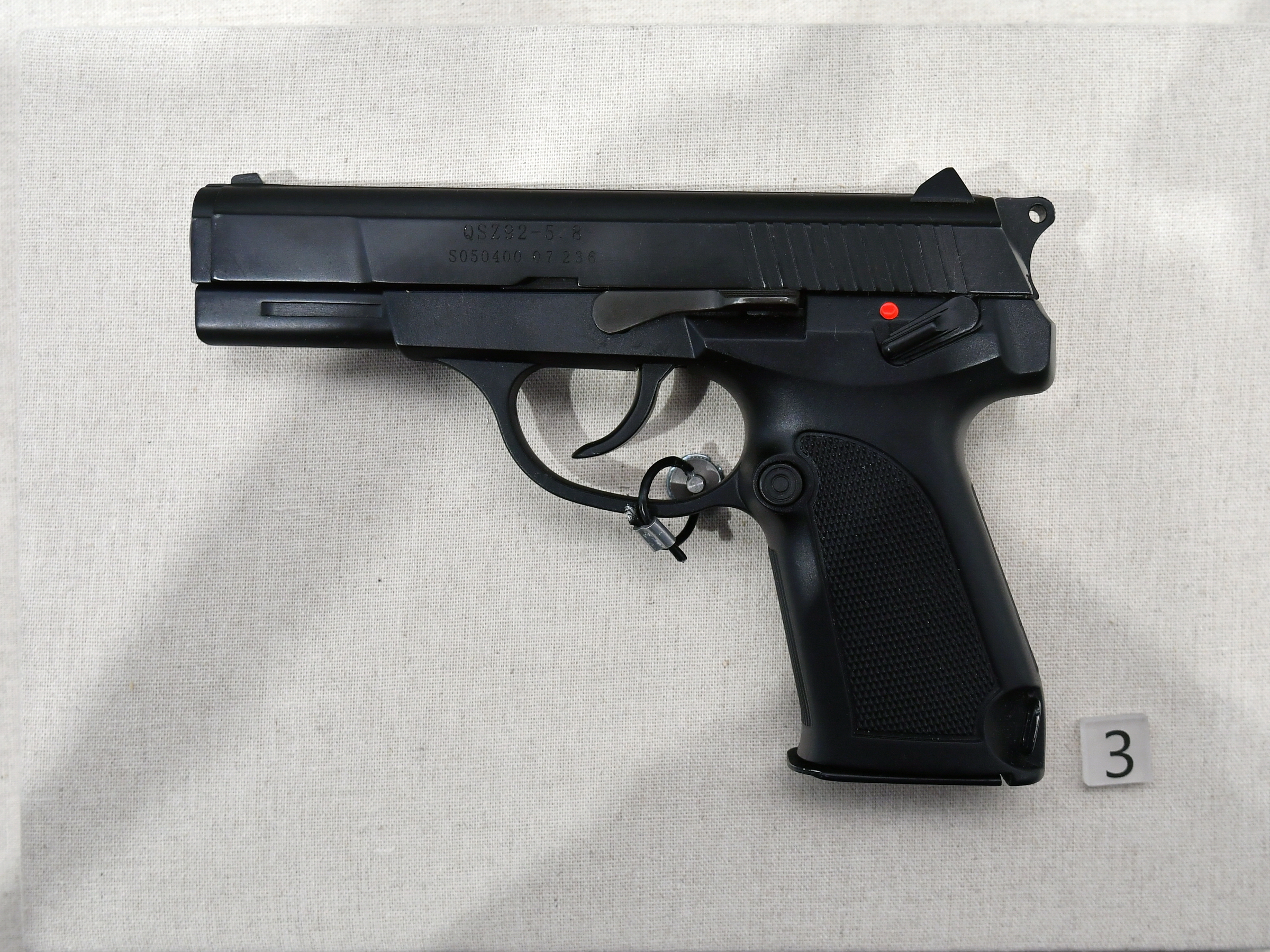
- Type: Semi-automatic pistol
- Place of origin: China

Service history
- Used by: See Users

Production history
- Designer: Liu Ming (刘铭) of the Small Arms Research Institute (formerly the 208 Research Institute); also attributed to Qing Shangsheng (卿上升)
- Designed: early 1990s
- Manufacturer: Chongqing Changfeng Machine Manufacturing Ltd
- Produced: 1998–present
- Variants: QSZ92-9, QSZ92-5.8

Specifications
- Mass: 760 g (1.68 lb)
- Length: 190 mm (7.48 in)
- Barrel length: 111 mm (4.33 in)
- Width: 35 mm (1.4 in)
- Height: 135 mm (5.3 in)
- Cartridge: 5.8×21mm DAP92; 9×19mm Parabellum
- Action: Short recoil, locked breech, rotating barrel lock
- Muzzle velocity: 350 m/s (1,150 ft/s) (9×19mm Parabellum)
- Effective firing range: 50 m (160 ft) (9×19mm Parabellum)
- Feed system: Detachable box magazine; capacities: 15 rounds (9×19mm); 20 rounds (5.8×21mm)
- Sights: Fixed, 3-dot type

The QSZ-92, also known as the Type 92 (Chinese: 92式手枪, romanized: Jiǔ Shì Èr Shoǔqiāng, lit. 'Type 92 handgun'), (Note: The pistol's designation "QSZ" stands for "'light weapon' (qīng wŭqì)—'pistol' (shǒuqiāng)—'automatic' (zìdòng)".) is a semi-automatic pistol designed by Norinco.

== History ==
The decision to develop a new pistol was made in 1987 to replace the Type 54/64/77. Research and development started in 1992.

Development of the QSZ-92 pistol began in 1994 and was adopted by the People's Liberation Army's forces in 1998. The export variants (9×19mm versions) include the CF-98 (barrel life c. 8,000 rds) and the NP-42 (barrel life c. 10,000 rds). The latter is the basic version without provisions for suppressor etc. Both have so far found commercial export in Canada. The CF-98 has also been sighted in parts of Africa.

In June 2022, it's reported that Iraq has made the pistol as the Babylon through the Defence Industries Commission. They are sold to Iraqi lawyers who need personal protection. Former prime minister Mustafa Al-Kadhimi was gifted the first Babylon made. It was reported that Norinco provided assistance in manufacturing the Babylon.

On 11 July 2024, it was confirmed that the Hong Kong Police Force would adopt the CF98A and CS/LP5 respectively to replace the S&W M10HB revolvers for uniformed officers and SIG P250 Dcc pistols for detectives as necessary parts for maintenance are running out.

== Design ==
=== Operation ===
The QSZ-92 operates with a recoil-operated, locked-breech and has a rotating barrel locking system, in which the barrel rotates on recoil to lock and unlock itself from the slide, and the front part of the frame under the barrel is shaped as an accessory rail to accept laser sights or flash lights.

A unique feature of this pistol is the detachable steel frame that sits inside the polymer grip and contains the fire control group.

Like many modern military pistols, the QSZ-92 has a double-action/single-action trigger with a combined safety/decocker.

=== Feeding ===
The QSZ-92 features a dual stack magazine that holds either fifteen rounds of 9×19mm Parabellum ammunition (QSZ-92-9) or twenty proprietary 5.8×21mm Chinese-made armor-piercing rounds with bottle-necked case and pointed bullets (QSZ-92-5.8), closely resembling the 5.7×28mm Belgian format.

Unlike most pistol magazines which narrow at the top for a consistent single-feed angle, the QSZ-92 has true double column staggered-feed in the same manner as many rifle magazines.

The star engraving on the QSZ-92 pistol grip indicates the ammo type. The 9×19mm Parabellum export version has the star, while the 5.8×21mm military version does not.

=== Accessory ===
The QSZ-92 is fitted with QUS-181 suppressor, which is mounted on the rail instead of the muzzle due to the rotating barrel design.

== Variants ==
=== Norinco production ===
==== QSZ-92 ====
Basic variant, which chambers the bottlenecked 5.8×21mm DAP92 ammunition (as the QSZ-92-5.8) or the 9×19mm Parabellum (QSZ-92-9).

Its R50 value is smaller than 5 cm (2.0 in), R100 value smaller than 11 cm (4.3 in). Its failure rate is lower than 2 out of 1000 and its lifespan is 3000 rounds.

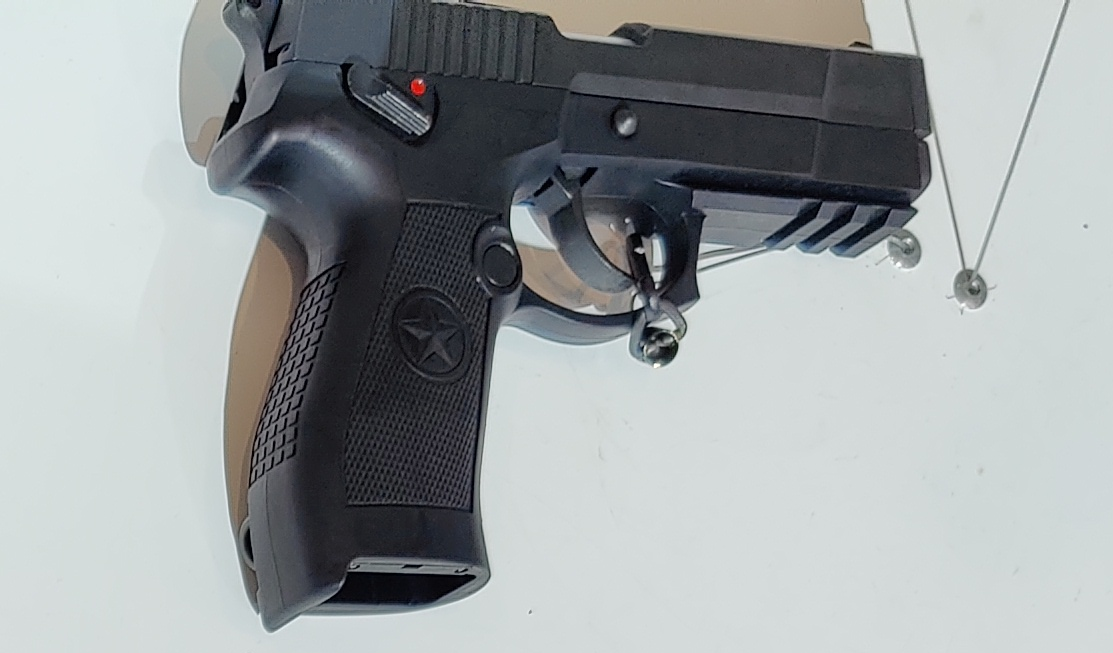
QSZ-92G on display

==== QSZ-92G ====
Redesigned variant with improved reliability, ergonomics and under-rail for attachments. Barrel lifespan is increased to 10,000 rounds. Like the original QSZ-92, the QSZ-92G is offered in both 5.8x21mm and 9mm Parabellum versions.

==== CF98 ====
Export variant chambered in 9×19mm Parabellum, with a lifespan of 8000 rounds.

===== CF98A =====
Redesigned export variant chambered in 9×19mm Parabellum replacing the CF98.

==== NP42 ====
Redesigned export variant chambering 9×19mm Parabellum with a lifespan of 10000 rounds, staggered-feed capacity of 15/10 rounds, and a decreased failure rate of 1 out of 1000.

Its accuracy has been improved, with a R50 value of smaller than 4 cm (1.6 in) and R100 value of less than 9 cm (3.5 in).

==== CS/LP5 ====
Compact pistol chambered in 9×19mm with 7-round magazines and a service life of 8,000 rounds.

==== QSZ-92A ====
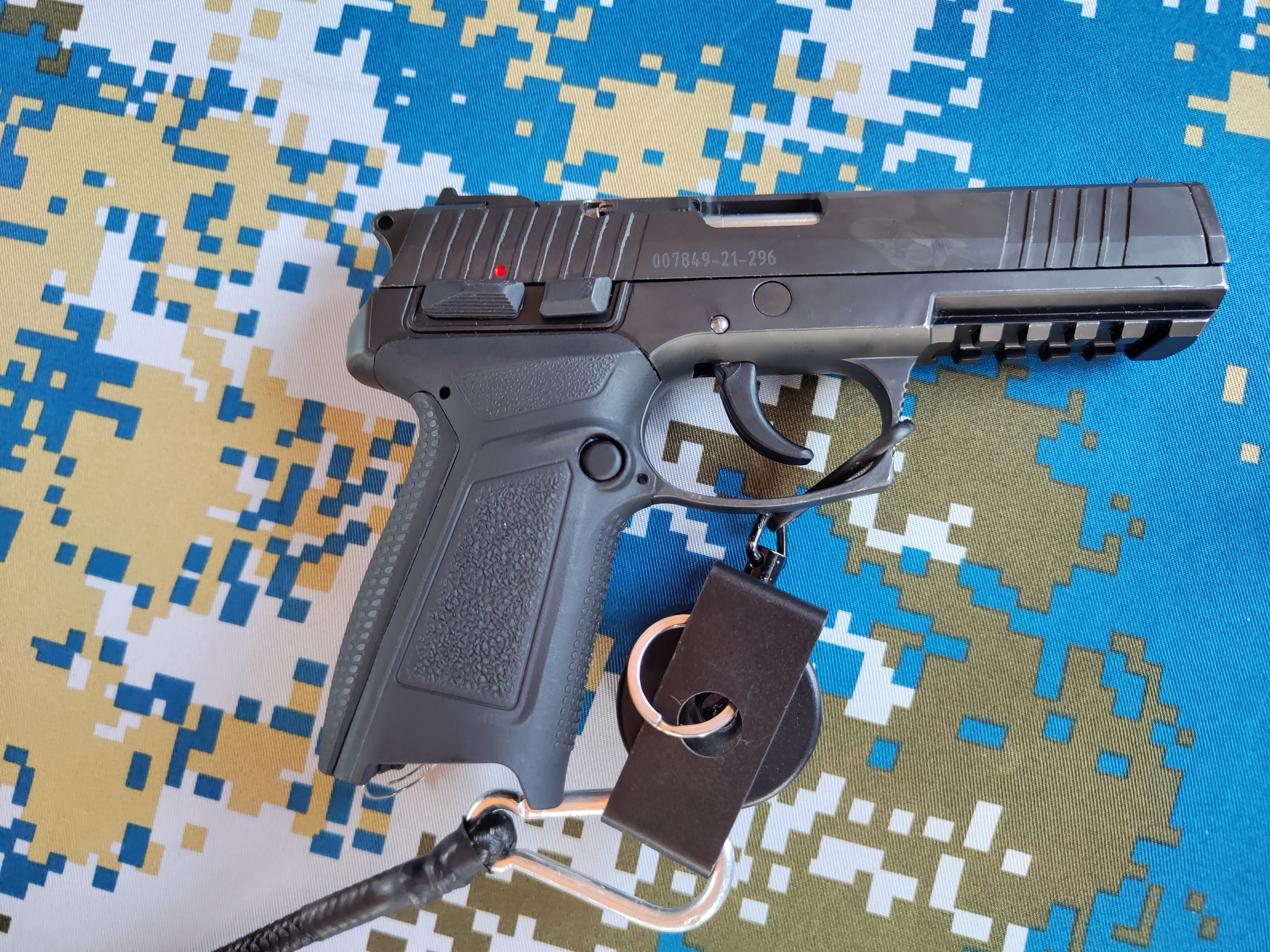
QSZ-92A

Improved model showcased in 2021. Standard variant of the new QSZ-92 platform, 15-round magazine.

==== QSZ-92B ====
Improved model showcased in 2021. Compact variant of the new QSZ-92 platform, 15-round magazine.

==== QSZ-193 ====
Improved model showcased in 2021. Sub-compact variant of the new QSZ-92 platform, 7-round magazine.

=== Foreign production ===
==== BOF Type 92 ====
Bangladeshi pistol made based on the QSZ-92/CF-98.

==== Babylon ====
Iraqi pistol based on the QSZ-92/CF-98. Made by the Defence Industries Commission with Norinco assistance.

Sold to Iraqi lawyers for personal protection. Former prime minister Mustafa Al-Kadhimi was gifted the first Babylon made.

== Gallery ==
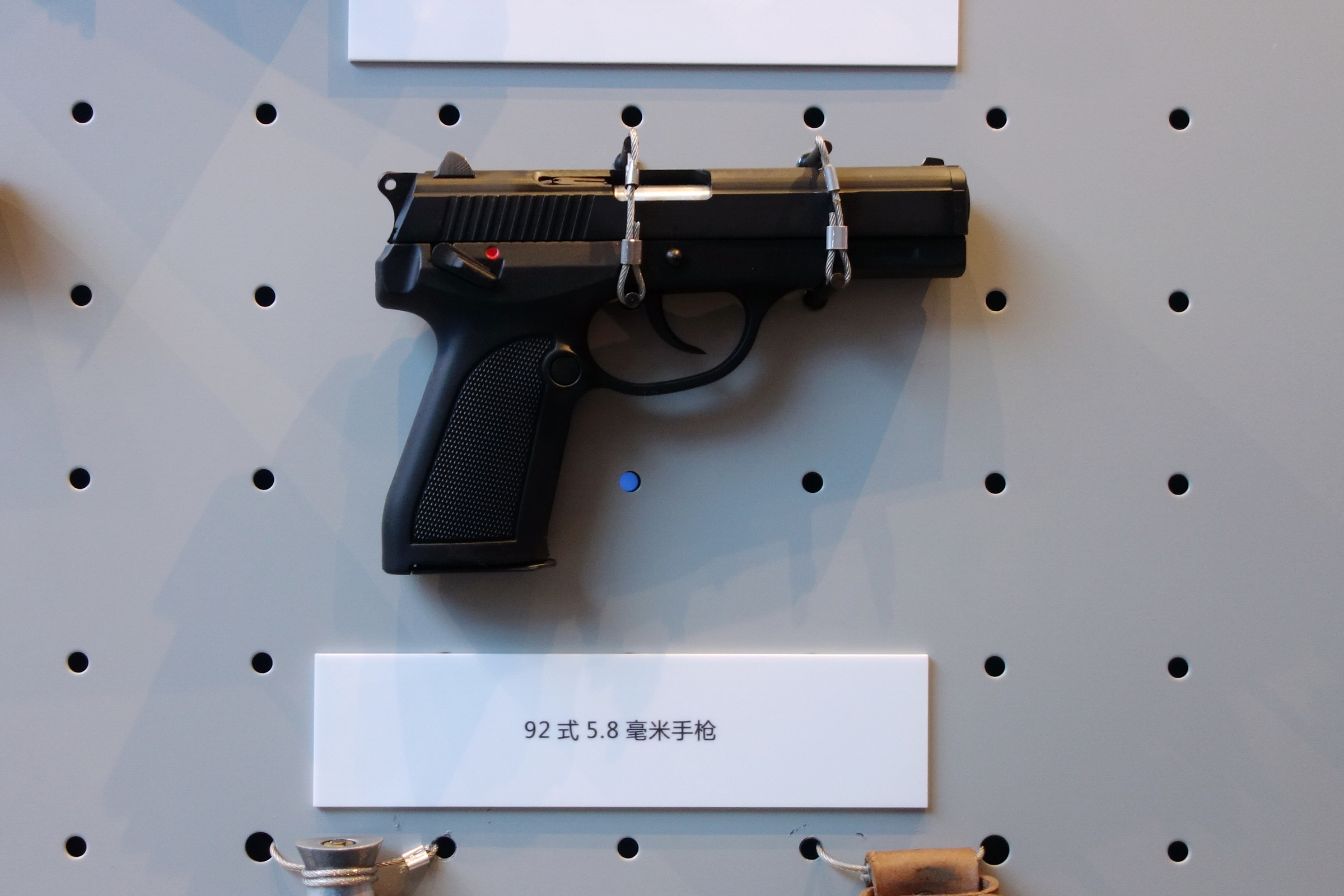
QSZ92-5.8mm Pistols

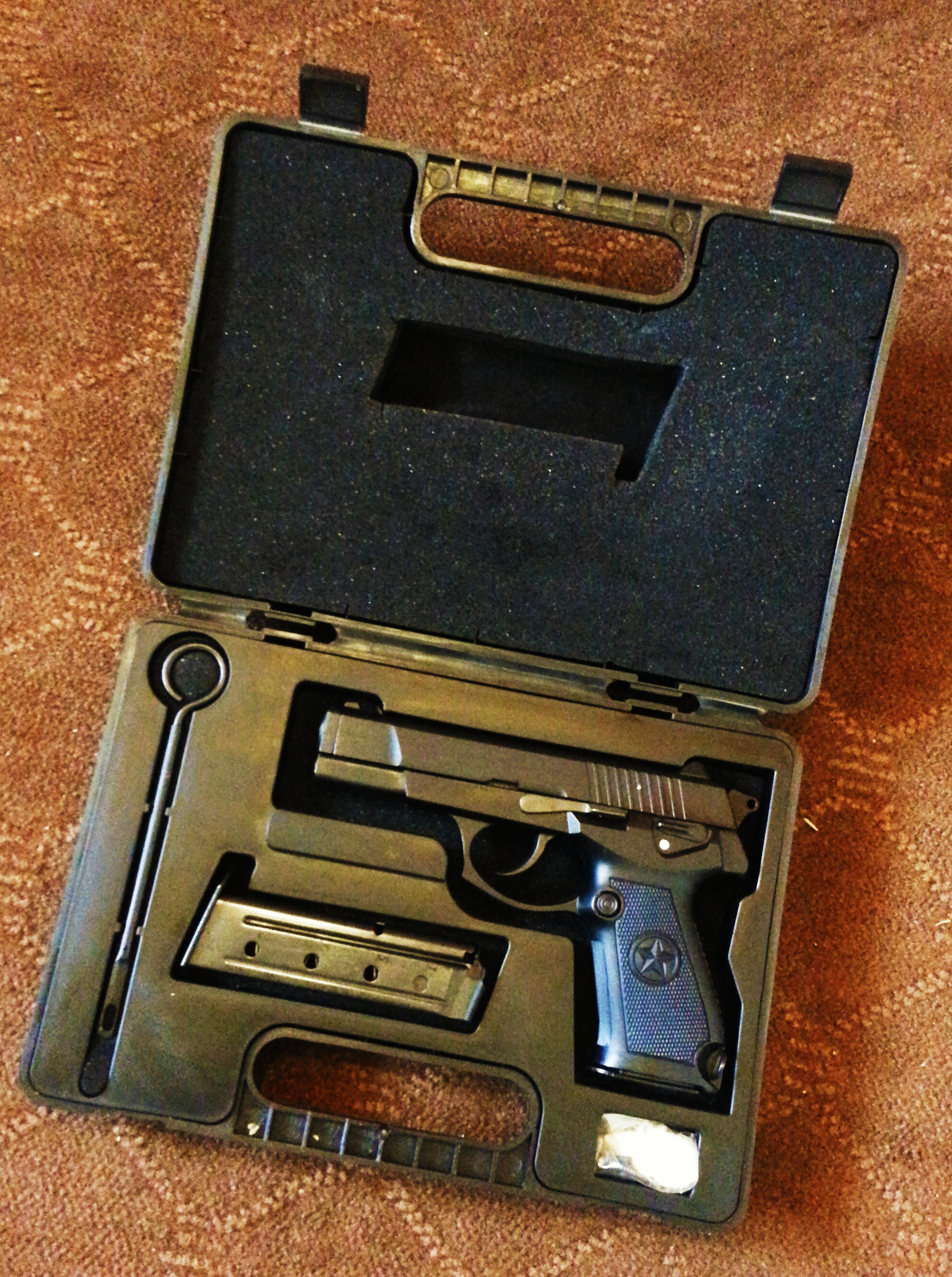
CF98-9mm Pistols

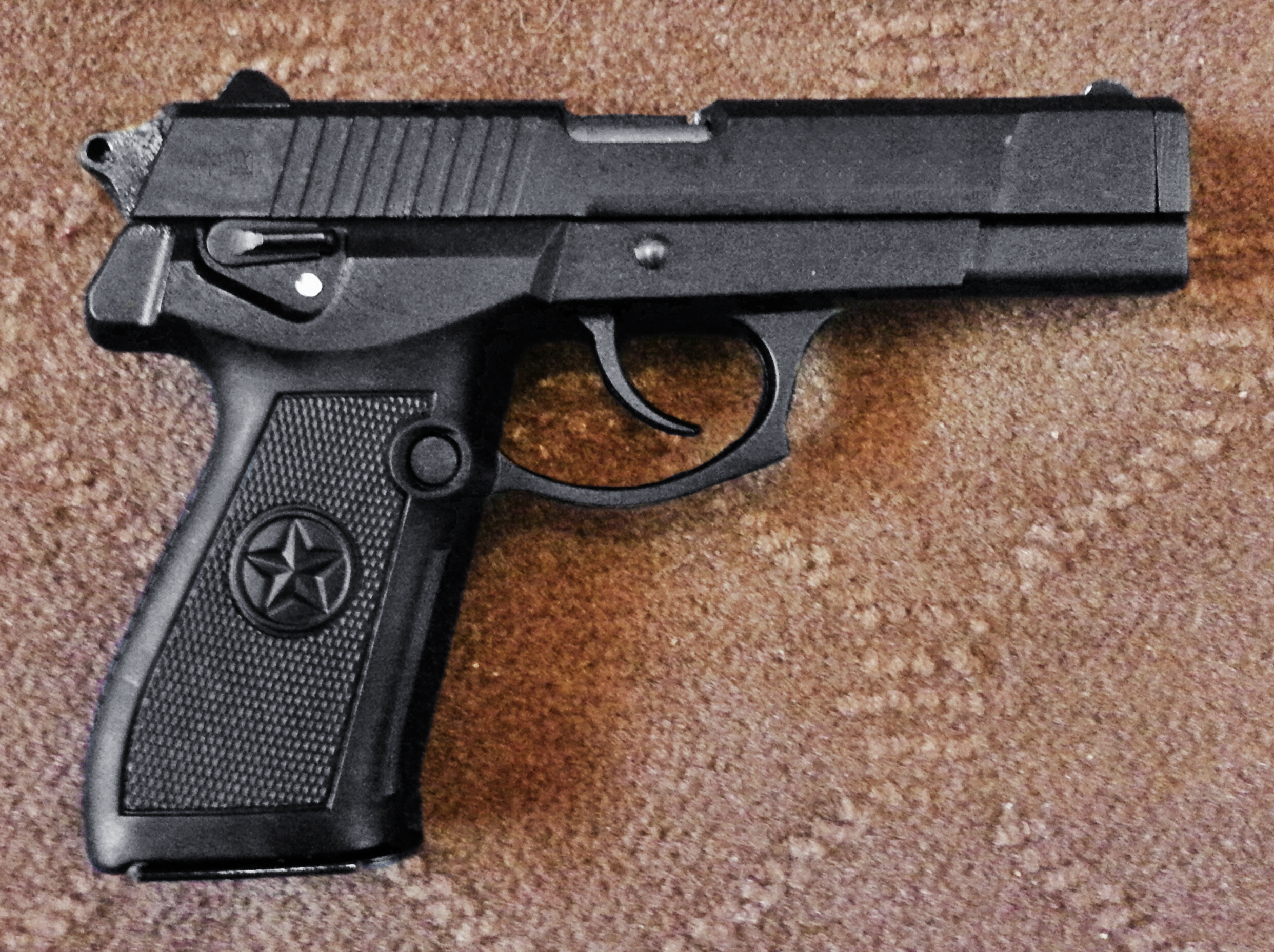
CF-98 pistol

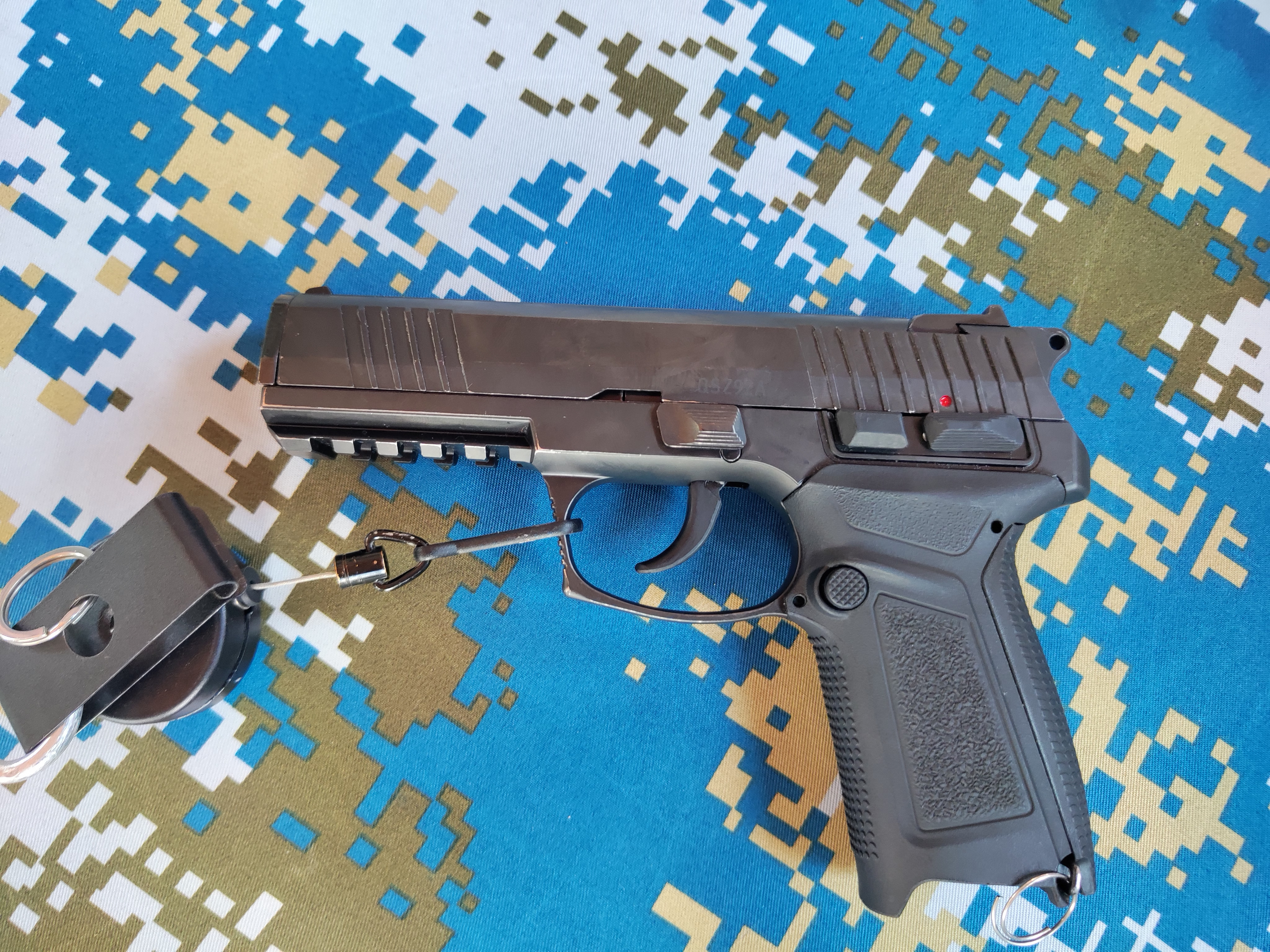
QSZ-92A pistol

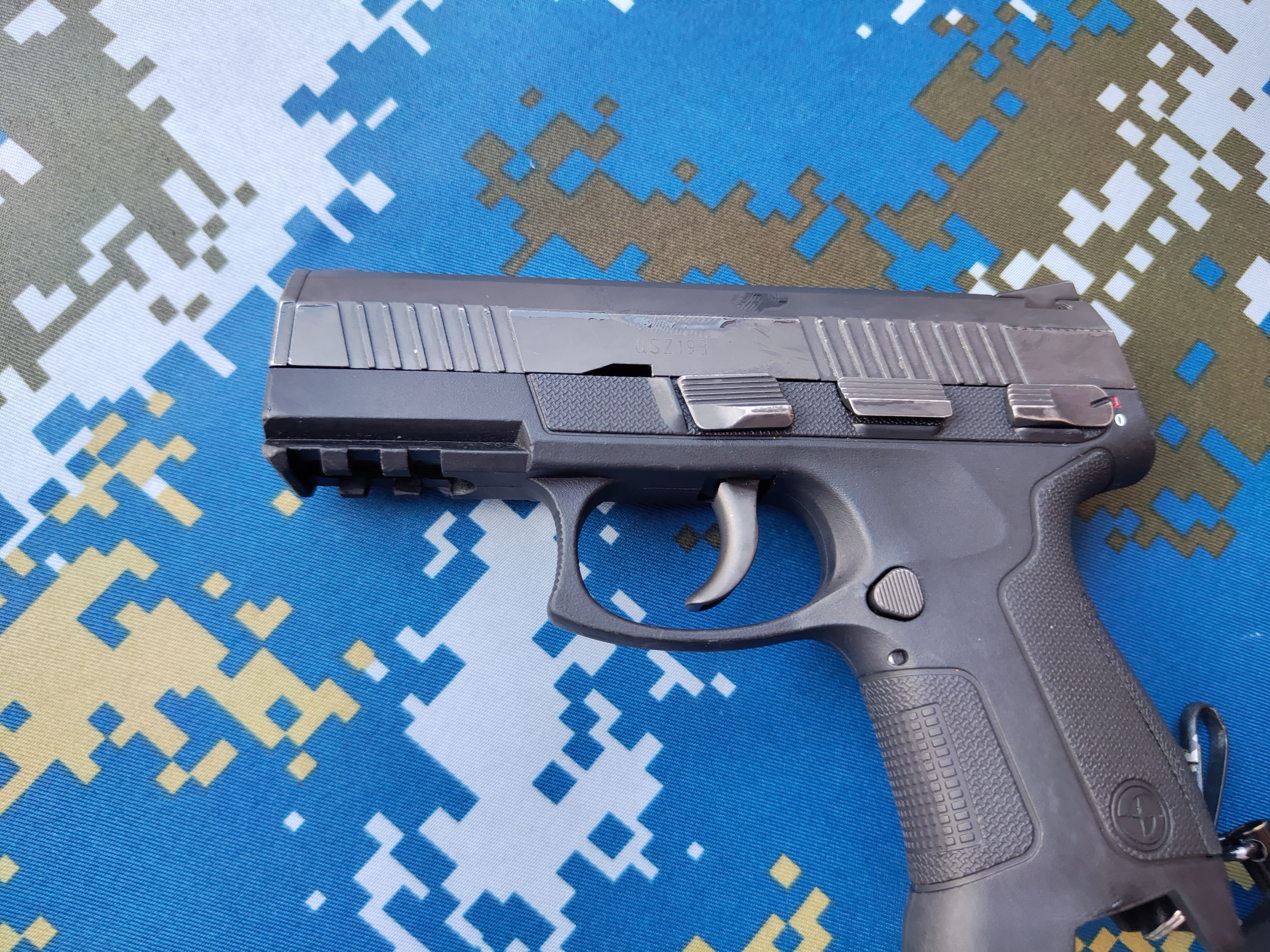
QSZ-193 compact pistol

== Users ==
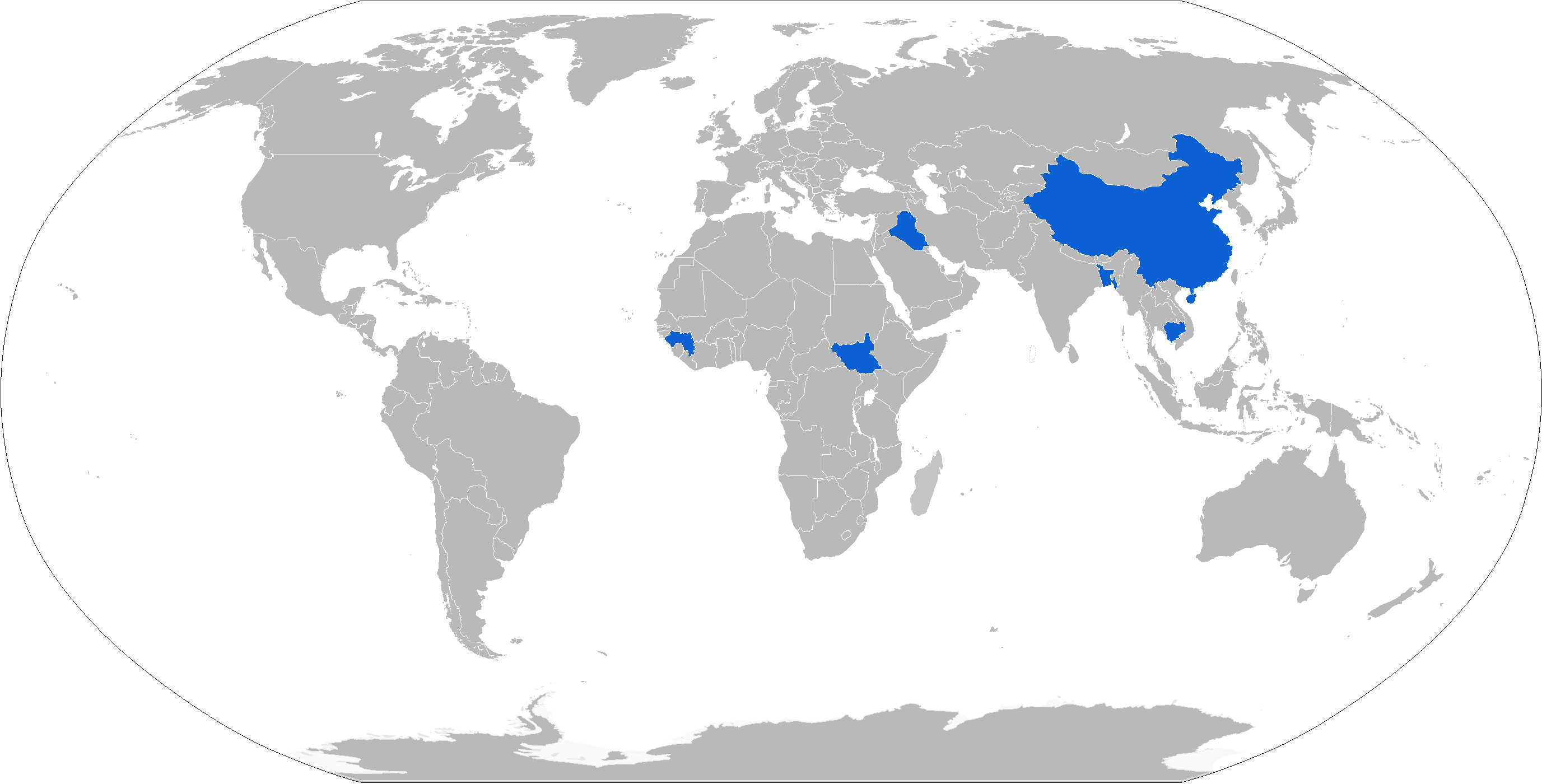
A map with QSZ-92 operators in blue.

- Bangladesh
- Cambodia
- China: People's Liberation Army, People's Armed Police, People's Police
  - Hong Kong: Hong Kong Police Force, replacing their Model 10 revolvers and SIG P250DCc pistols.
- Iraq
- South Sudan: 660 NP-42 received in 2014

== See also ==
- QSW-06
- QSZ-11
- QSB-11
- Type 54 pistol
- Type 64 pistol
- Type 77 pistol
