= Type 70 =

Type 70 may refer to:

- Type 70 pistol
- Type 70 rocket launcher
- Type 70 Armored Recovery Vehicle, Japan, variant of the Type 61 tank
