= LPO-50 =

Lyogkiy Pyekhotnyy Ognyemyot 50
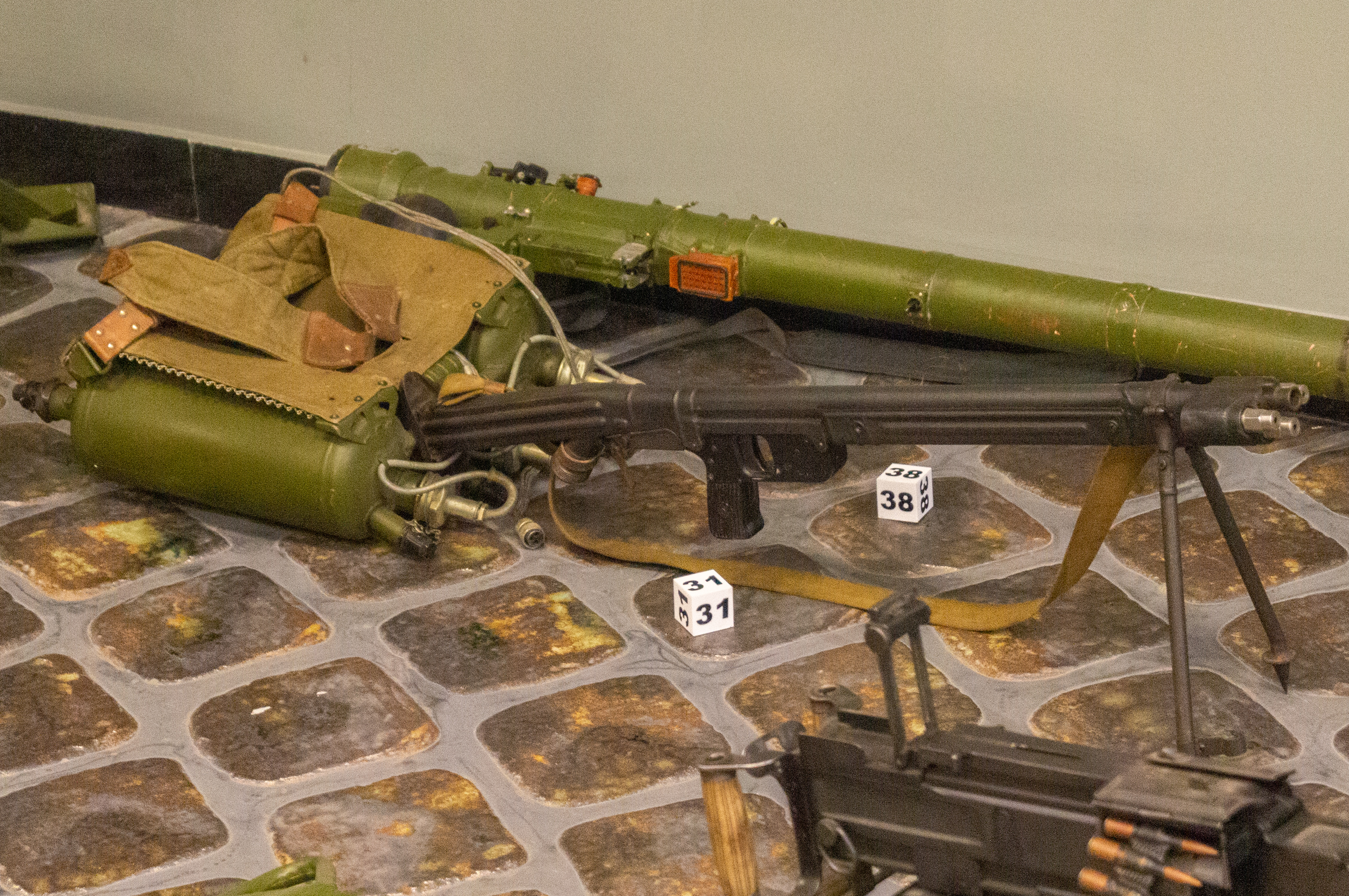
- On display at the Technical Museum of Vadim Zadorozhny, Moscow
- Type: Flamethrower
- Place of origin: Soviet Union

Service history
- Used by: See § Users
- Wars: Vietnam War; The Troubles; Sino-Vietnamese War; Sino-Vietnamese conflicts (1979–1991); Iran–Iraq War

Production history
- Designed: 1953
- Produced: 1955 − c. 1975
- Variants: See § Variants

Specifications
- Mass: 23 kg (51 lb)
- Length: 85 cm (33 in)
- Action: 3× primer cartridges plus electric ignition
- Effective firing range: 50–70 m (55–77 yd)
- Feed system: 3× 3.5 L (0.77 imp gal; 0.92 US gal) fuel tanks

The LPO-50 (Russian: Легкий Пехотный Огнемет, romanized: Legkiy Pyekhotnyy Ognemet, lit. 'Light Infantry Flamethrower') is a Soviet flamethrower developed during the 1950s to replace the aging ROKS flamethrowers, it saw limited service during the Vietnam War, used by the Vietcong and the PAVN before it was replaced by the RPO "Rys" and RPO-A Shmel incendiary rocket launchers, though a modernized version known as the Type 74 remains in service with the Chinese People's Liberation Army.

== History ==
During World War II, the Soviets used the ROKS-2 and later the simplified ROKS-3. While these designs proved to be reliable, the Soviet Army demanded the development of an easier to operate design with a longer range.

In 1953, the LPO-50 was developed as the replacement for the aging ROKS flamethrowers, and after trial testings, serial production began in 1955. The Chinese quickly showed interest in the new flamethrower and acquired a license to produce the LPO-50 locally as the Type 58.

According to Heidler, the earliest service record dates from 1966, while McNab stated that it was tested and adopted around 1967–1968. Warsaw Pact members received Soviet-made LPO-50s alongside obsolete ROKS flamethrowers, with East Germany receiving large numbers and Romania producing its own copies of the LPO-50.

The LPO-50 saw limited service in the Vietnam War by the People's Army of Vietnam (PAVN) against American forces and the Army of the Republic of Vietnam, their use alongside Chinese-made Type 58s was restricted due the lack of fuel on the frontlines.

The PAVN used Soviet-made flamethrowers to assault an American base at the Battle of Lang Vei, prompting a Marine counterattack with M2A1-7 flamethrowers, while the Viet Cong reportedly used 60 flamethrowers on the Đắk Sơn massacre. Iraqi forces also made use of the LPO-50 during the Iran–Iraq War.

The Provisional Irish Republican Army (Provisional IRA) received some LPO-50s from Libya, using them on the attack on Derryard checkpoint in 1989. The United States Congress in 2011 cited an Irish Times article reporting that the IRA had an estimated 6 units of this model of flamethrower (prior to 2001).

In service, the shots duration (2–3 seconds) and range were criticized as too short, its effect on targets was considered insufficient by soldiers, and when the flamethrower teams position was discovered, they quickly became target of enemy small arms fire, leading into the development of the RPO "Rys", which is more portable and can fire 4 litres (0.88 imp gal; 1.1 US gal) napalm rockets at a range of 200 metres (220 yd). With the RPO introduction in 1975, the LPO-50 was declared obsolete and gradually withdrawn from front service and put in storage, while some were distributed to allied countries.

While conventional flamethrowers have been phased out from service by most armies during the 1970s, the Chinese People's Liberation Army still retains the Type 74, a modernized version of the Type 58 in active service with combat engineering companies and frequently featured in staged press photos during military exercises and demonstrations, as late as 2024.

== Design ==
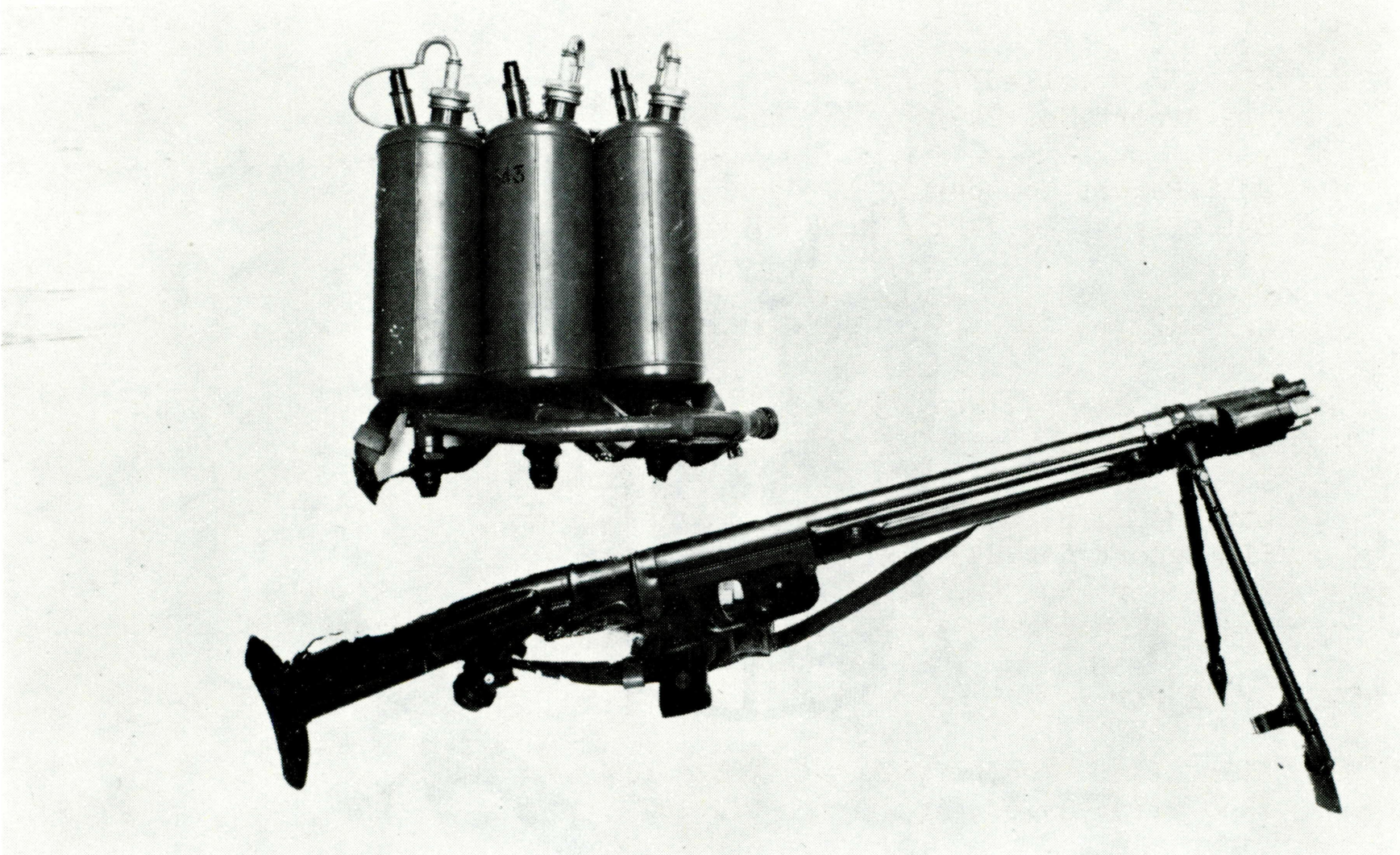
Side view of a LPO-50

This LPO-50 was designed as a lightweight, infantry-carried flamethrower. While it weighed roughly the same as its predecessor, the construction was completely changed: the backpack is composed of three tanks with a capacity of 3.5 L (0.77 imp gal; 0.92 US gal), enough fuel for six blasts. Each tank has a filler neck with a screw-on powder chamber. Safeties include an extra pressure relief valve per tank, non-return valves on each hose connection, and a grip safety located on the front of the flame projector grip.

To ignite the fuel mixture, the operator have to insert a propellant charge on each tank powder chamber and one PP9-RO primer cartridge. Once the PP9-RO round is ignited, the gases generated flow into the tank through six holes bored at the bottom of the powder chamber, pushing the incendiary mixture to the flame projector via a manifold connecting the three tanks to the hose connected to the projector.

The flame projector is 85 cm (33 in) long and features a stock, pistol grip, and a folding bipod. There's also three chambers for an incendiary cartridge located below and on both sides of the muzzle. Each chamber is connected to a specific fuel tank and ignites the fuel mixture. When the trigger is pulled a power pack consisting of four 1.5 V batteries simultaneously ignites the tank-pressurizing and incendiary cartridges. The power pack is located on the butt of the flame projector and lasts about 600 ignitions. The firer can fire three shots before reloading by changing the selector lever position between shots, or fill each tank with different incendiary mixtures and fire them as required.

Effective range was estimated at 50 m (55 yd) by Grau, 50–70 m (55–77 yd) according to Isby and Heidler, while Jones and Ness give a maximum range of 20 m (22 yd) with unthickened fuel and 70 m (77 yd) with thickened fuel. Due the strong recoil, the weapon can only be accurately fired from a prone position.

Each burst lasted for 2–3 seconds each, which was considered as too short by the reports of the East German National People's Army and soldiers. According to Isby, it was estimated that a LPO-50 blast have a probability of 97% to hit a vehicle or building at a range of 25 m (27 yd) and 81% at 50 m (55 yd).

== Variants ==
=== Soviet Union ===
- LPO-50 − Original production model, also manufactured by China and Romania

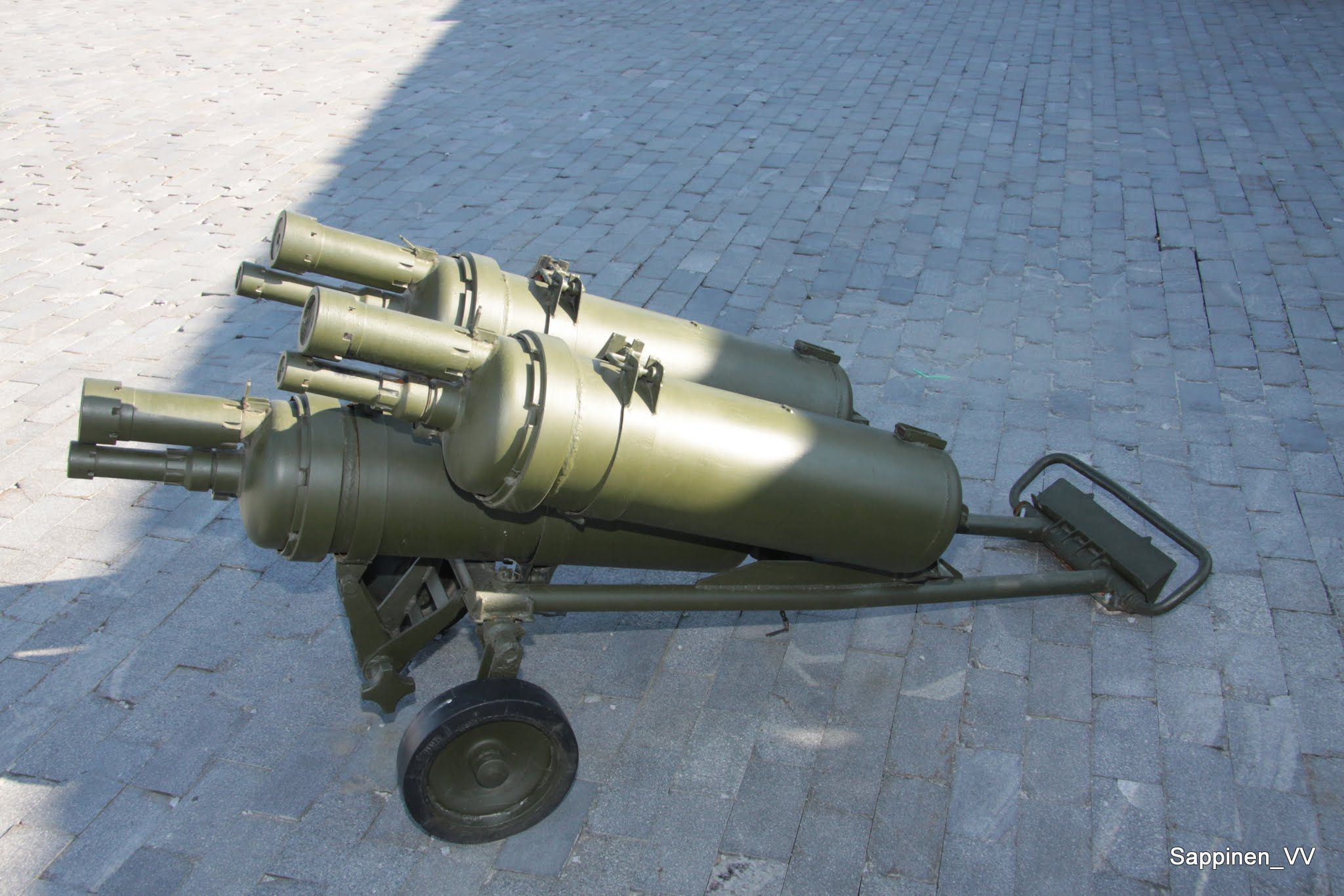
A TPO-50 on display at the UMMC Museum Complex

- TPO-50 − A related design with a electrically ignited cartridge system similar to the LPO-50, it consists of three fuel tanks mounted on top of a two-wheeled cart with a recoil spade at the rear. Each tank holds 21 L (4.6 imp gal; 5.5 US gal) of incendiary mixture, can be fired together or individually and be dismounted if necessary.

Folding front and rear sights are provided with each cylinder, which can be elevated from +2° to +50°, while traverse is adjusted by moving the cart; electrically ignited cartridges are used to simultaneously push the incendiary mixture out of the cylinders and ignite the fuel via a 6 V (4× 1.5 V) power pack, which could be placed remotely from the cart, allowing soldiers to fire the weapon behind cover if necessary.
The TPO-50 is operated by a crew of two, have a total weight of 170 kg (370 lb) loaded and 130 kg (290 lb) empty, and a maximum range of 180 m (200 yd) using thickened fuel and 65 m (71 yd) with unthickened fuel. According to Grau, maximum effective range is about 150 m (160 yd)

=== China ===
- Type 58 − Licensed copy, it's virtually identical to the LPO-50 with a few minor modifications
- Type 74 − A modernized version of the Type 58 developed during the 1970s, its somewhat lighter than the original, featuring two 4 L (0.88 imp gal; 1.1 US gal) fuel tanks and two incendiary chambers instead of three. It can fire 2–3 second bursts with an effective range of 40–50 m (44–55 yd). As late as 2010, it was offered for export by Norinco

== Users ==
- Bulgaria
- Cambodia − Type 74
- China − Produced locally as the Type 58 and Type 74
- East Germany
- Iraq
- Libya
- Provisional Irish Republican Army − Supplied by Libya
- Romania − Produced locally
- Soviet Union − Replaced by the RPO Rys
- Vietnam
