= PF-97 =

Type of rocket launcher

- Type: Rocket launcher
- Place of origin: China

The PF-97 (Chinese: 97式93毫米火箭筒, lit. 'Type 97 93 millimetre rocket launcher') is a Chinese, 93 mm (3.7 in) portable, disposable, unguided, shoulder-launched, rocket launcher.

== History ==
Originally a Chinese licensed copy of the Russian RPO-A Shmel thermobaric rocket launcher, the PF-97 was later developed into the PF-11 (Type 11) rocket launcher system with weight reduction, newer construction, and multiple types of warheads.

The PF-97 was developed as a replacement for flamethrowers and FHJ-84 incendiary rockets in the PLA service. It sits between the smaller caliber DZJ-08 and larger PF-98 recoilless weapons.

== Description ==
The PF-97 is a Chinese copy of the Russian RPO-A Shmel. In 1992, China bought the manufacturing license of the RPO-A from KBP Instrument Design Bureau. A local version was developed in 1996, which was then certified in 1997. It entered serial production in 2000. The PF-97 (RPO-A) has a larger explosive filler compared to the PF-89's thermobaric variant, ensuring adequate lethality. However, the rocket launcher system weighs 12 kg (26 lb) due to the explosives, which is significantly heavier than other disposable rocket systems in the PLA service. An improved version, known as PF-97A, exists. PF-97A combined the previously separated rocket booster with the warhead.

The PF-11 is a redesigned version of the PF-97. The launcher was modified, with the foregrip removed to save weight, and has a new thermal sleeve similar to that of DZJ-08. The PF-11 was later developed into a weapon family with multiple types of munition chocies, including high explosive anti-tank (HEAT), high explosive fragmentation (HE-Frag), incendiary, anti-bunker assault munitions, etc.

== Variants ==
PF-97
Chinese copy of the RPO-A Shmel. Thermobaric warhead.
PF-97A
Improved PF-97 with fixed rocket booster. PF-97A can be carried in twin-barrel mode for easier transportation.
BFK2
Export version of the PF-97A.
PF-11
Redesigned PF-97 with foregrip removed and new thermal sleeves. Added capability to launch high explosive anti-tank (HEAT), high explosive fragmentation (HE-Frag), incendiary, anti-bunker munitions, etc. The system has a reported range of 850 m (2,790 ft).
DZG-141
A further development of the PF-11. Multipurpose bunker buster warhead.
BKM6
Export version of the DZG-141.
DZS-151
A further development of the PF-11. High-explosive fragmentation (HE-Frag) warhead.
DZP-151
A further development of the PF-11. High-explosive anti-tank (HEAT) warhead.
DZF-151
A further development of the PF-11. Smoke round.

== Users ==
- China: People's Liberation Army

== See also ==
- DZJ-08
- PF-89
- PF-98
- RPO-A Shmel – (Soviet Union)
- FHJ-84 – (China)
