= PF-98 =

Chinese anti-tank rocket launcher system

Type 98
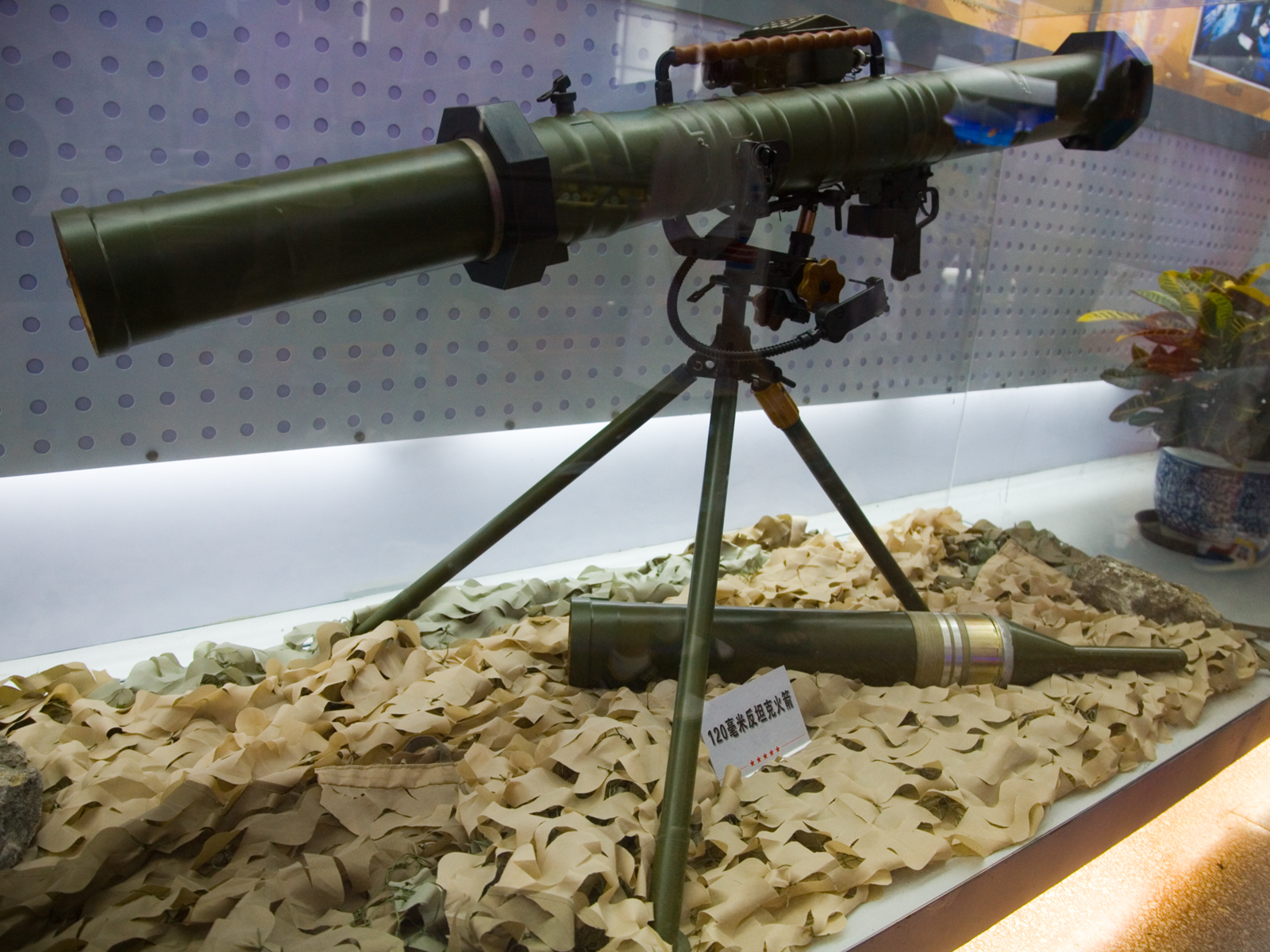
- A PF-98A rocket launcher at the China People's Revolution Military Museum in Beijing during the 2007 Our troops towards the sun exhibition.
- Type: With firing control system: rocket launcher system With only telescopic sight: Unguided anti-tank rocket launcher
- Place of origin: China

Service history
- In service: 1998–present
- Used by: People's Liberation Army; Bangladesh Army

Production history
- Designed: 1990s
- Manufacturer: Norinco

Specifications
- Mass: 10 kg (22 lb) (launcher, PF-98); 7 kg (15 lb) (launcher, PF-98A)
- Length: 1191 mm
- Crew: 1–2
- Caliber: 120 mm
- Elevation: −6° / +30°
- Traverse: 360°
- Rate of fire: 4–6 rounds per minute
- Muzzle velocity: 310 m/s
- Maximum firing range: 800 m (HEAT); 1800 m (HEI)
- Sights: Y/MK/PF-98(Y)-120 (4x optical/fire control); Y/MK/PF-98(L)-120 (4x optical)

The Type 98 (PF-98) is a 120mm unguided anti-tank rocket system developed by Norinco for the People's Liberation Army as a successor to the Type 65 and Type 78 recoilless guns. It is also known by its nickname, "Queen Bee". It can be equipped with a firing control system which can calculate and adjust for projectile drop before the rocket fires.

== Development ==
The PLA began to search for a successor for the Type 78 in the 1990s. The older, 1950s-era equipment began to show its age. The Type 98 was revealed with a garrison unit in Macao in 1999, while some elite units began to receive the weapon after 2000.

The design makes the accurate delivery of a 120 mm multi-purpose high-explosive or high-explosive anti-tank projectile with negligible recoil possible. The weapon can be tripod- or shoulder-fired.

== Design ==
=== Launcher ===
PF-98 reusable tube launcher is a fibreglass-wrapped smoothbore gun and weighs under 10 kg (22 lb). Two variants, battalion-level and company-level, are available. Both variants share the same launch tube and rocket projectiles. Their difference in capabilities and usage lies in their sighting system and tripod mount. Both PF-98 variants are fitted with a proprietary rail mount that can be equipped with a fire control system, daylight optics, or night vision scope. The Battalion version features a fire control system, medium-range night vision scope, and large tripod. The tripod of the battalion version allows an elevation of +30° to −6°, and a horizontal traverse of 360°. The company version has daylight optics, close-range night vision scope, and a small fixed tripod to support the launcher in the prone position. The weapon can be operated by one soldier or a crew of two. The accessories can be mounted interchangeably.

The PF-98A is the improved variant of PF-98, which was incorporated into service in 2006. The PF-98A launcher's firing tube, tripod and carrying handle are modified to reduce weight. The new launcher weighs 7 kg (15 lb). It's also fitted with improved night-vision scope and fire control systems. The PF-98A launcher can be distinguished from its predecessor by its octagon-shaped forward and rear shock absorbers, which prevent the launcher from rolling on uneven surfaces.

The PLA deployed PF-98 to both Company and Battalion firepower units for direct infantry fire support, with iterative improvements such as new fire-control systems, lighter launcher tubes, and programmable munitions. Since the deployment of more sophisticated missiles at battalion/company-level firepower units, PF-98 launchers have been transferred to infantry squads of lower echelons. In late 2018, the lightweight PF-98A was deployed for infantry use on a squad level.

=== Sights ===
Three types of sight systems are available for PF-98 series: fire control systems, daylight (4×) telescopic sights, and night-vision scopes. PF-98 battalion version is fitted with the fire control system and night-vision scope, while the company version is fitted with the daylight telescopic sight and night-vision scope. An integrated fire control/night vision system is available for the PF-98A variants.

==== Fire control systems ====
The fire-control of the battalion version Type 98 consists of a Y/MK/PF-98(Y)-120 (4×) optical sight, which includes a fire-control computer, a laser rangefinder, an outside display, an LED display inside the optical sight, and a keyboard with 25 buttons. After pressing the range-finding button on the extension cord, the system will automatically irradiate the target and make ballistic calculations. The operator can input additional information such as target speed, direction, crosswind, temperature and altitude using the keyboard. After calculating the lead of the moving target, the computer will put a light spot in the gunner’s optical sight. The soldier then uses the light spot as the crosshair to guarantee a hit. This mechanism reduces the reaction time and makes for increased accuracy. This fire control system went through two upgrades, Type 00 and Type 01. Type 00 features revised aiming reticles. Type 01 fire control system featured a smaller fire control unit with a new ballistic computer, a new rangefinder unit, and a revised keyboard layout with 12 buttons.

Type 98A fire control system features a new laser rangefinder, speed calculation unit, and ballistic computer. The Type 98A FCS will automatically track the target and calculate the aiming assist light spot based on the range, target speed, selected ammo type, temperature and altitude. In late 2018, a new integrated fire control system is observed in PLAGF military exercises. The new fire control system is fitted with a night-vision scope on the top, and the keyboard is moved to the left side. New FCS is capable of airburst programming.

PF-98 Fire Control Systems
Name	Introduction	Description
Type 98	1998	Original fire control system.
Type 00	2000	Improved Type 98 FCS with revised reticles.
Type 01	2001	Improved Type 00 FCS with revised keyboard, new rangefinder, new ballistic computer, and smaller size.
Type 98A	2006	Improved Type 01 FCS with new ballistic computer, new battery, new rangefinder, target speed measurement unit, and automatic tracking function.
Integrated FCS	2018	Improved Type 98A FCS with integrated night-vision device, airburst programming function.

==== Optical sights ====
The company version Type 98 is fitted with an Y/MK/PF-98(L)-120 (4x) telescopic optical sight. Inside the scope, a light spot at the top will flash every second/half a second to assist the shooter's leading calculation. The company level's optical sight has the same ranging marks and reticles as the one on the PF-89.

Both company and battalion version PF-98 have dedicated night vision scope, with the battalion version having a longer range. For PF-98A, company and battalion version no longer has different night-vision scope. The battery duration for night-vision is improved from 7 hours on PF-98, to 40 hours on PF-98A. The weight of the scope is also reduced from 2.85 kg to 1.2 kg.

=== Projectiles ===
Type 98 High Explosive Anti Tank (HEAT) projectile, military designation DZP-98, is armed with a tandem-warhead and an electronically timed fuse. The round can pierce the reactive armor of a main battle tank, and has an armor-piercing depth of about 800 mm RHA (under 90 degrees, after ERA) at a maximum effective range of 800 m. The maximum flying range is 2000 m. The HEAT rounds weights 8.03 kg (17.7 lb). Type 98A HEAT projectile features lightweight material, reducing the cartridge weight to 7.91 kg (17.4 lb). The case for booster charge is fitted with a small drogue parachute to reduce its fly out distance for improved safety inside backblast area.

Type 98 Multipurpose High Explosive Incendiary (HEI) projectile, military designation DZY-98, has a warhead with 2000 steel balls and zirconium incendiary material. This projectile is capable of piercing 400 mm armor and spread fragments inside the vehicle, or producing fragments to kill other personnel within 25 m of the point of impact. The maximum range is between 1,800 and 2,000 m with fire control system or 800 m with daylight optics. The multipurpose round wrights around 7.6 kg (16.8 lb). Type 98A HEI projectile features lightweight material, reducing the cartridge weight to 7.42 kg (16.4 lb). Other technical parameters are kept the same.

Type 98 Thermobaric (FAE) projectile, military designation DZT-98, is armed with a thermobaric warhead capable of eliminating targets within a 90 m^{3} room. The maximum range is between 1,800 and 2,000 m with fire control system or 800 m with daylight optics. Type 98 FAE projectiles are kept the same in Type 98A upgrade.

Type 98A Bunker Buster, military designation DZD-98A, is developed and deployed with Type 98A rocket launcher. The round can penetrate about 100 mm RHA at 60 degrees or 0.8 m (2.6 ft) of C35 concrete. The maximum range is between 1,800 and 2,000 m with fire control system or 800 m with daylight optics.

PF-98 Projectiles
Designation	DZP98	DZP98A	DZY98	DZY98A	DZT98	DZD98A	DZR98A
Ammo type	High-explosive anti-tank	High-explosive anti-tank	Multipurpose incendiary	Multipurpose incendiary	Thermobaric	Assault/Bunker buster	Airburst incendiary
Cartridge diameter	120 mm	120 mm	120 mm	120 mm	120 mm	120 mm	120 mm
Cartridge weight	8.03 kg (17.7 lb)	7.91 kg (17.4 lb)	9.15 kg (20.2 lb)	7.42 kg (16.4 lb)	7.42 kg (16.4 lb)	8.6 kg (19 lb)	N/A
Cartridge length	970 mm	970 mm	827 mm	827 mm	825 mm	942 mm	N/A
Effective range (FCS)	800 m (2,600 ft)	800 m (2,600 ft)	2,000 m (6,600 ft)	2,000 m (6,600 ft)	2,000 m (6,600 ft)	2,000 m (6,600 ft)	N/A
Effective range (optics)	400 m (1,300 ft)	400 m (1,300 ft)	800 m (2,600 ft)	800 m (2,600 ft)	800 m (2,600 ft)	800 m (2,600 ft)	N/A
Minimal range	40 m (130 ft)	40 m (130 ft)	40 m (130 ft)	40 m (130 ft)	40 m (130 ft)	60 m (200 ft)	N/A
Penetration (RHA)	800 mm/90° 230 mm/68°	800 mm/90° 230 mm/68°	400 mm/90° 44 mm/55°	400 mm/90° 44 mm/55°	N/A	100 mm/60° 800 mm (2.6 ft) of C35 concrete	N/A
Velocity	246 m/s (810 ft/s)	246 m/s (810 ft/s)	205 m/s (670 ft/s)	205 m/s (670 ft/s)	N/A	N/A	N/A

== Variants ==
PF98
Battalion and company level version.
PF98A
Lightweight version with improved fire control system, night-vision scope, and tripod.

== Users ==
- Bangladesh
  - Bangladesh Army
- Cameroon
  - Cameroon Armed Forces
- China
  - People's Liberation Army Ground Force
- Indonesia
- Zimbabwe

== See also ==
- PF-89
- PF-97
- Carl Gustav recoilless rifle (MAAWS) - Swedish–American recoilless rifle
- Shoulder-launched Multipurpose Assault Weapon (SMAW) - American rocket launcher
- Panzerfaust 3 (Pzf-3) - German rocket launcher
- RPG-29 - Soviet reusable rocket-propelled grenade (RPG) launcher
