= RPO Rys =

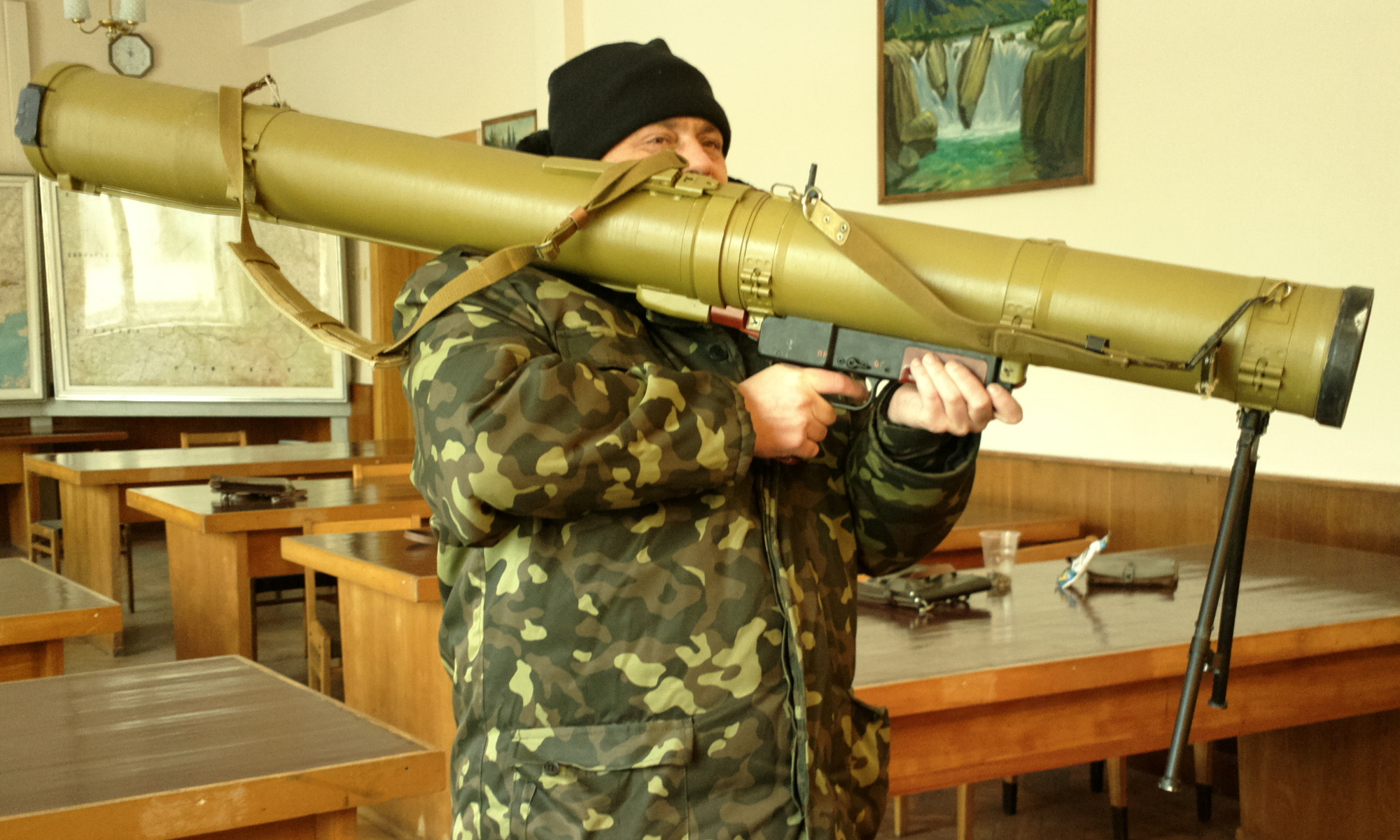
- A RPO Rys in Ukraine, 2014
- Type: Rocket-propelled flamethrower
- Place of origin: Soviet Union

Service history
- In service: Since 1975
- Wars: Soviet–Afghan War; First Chechen War; Russo-Ukrainian War

Specifications
- Mass: 3.2 kg - Launcher (empty); 9.4 kg - Cartridge; 12.6 kg - Loaded
- Length: 500 mm - Unloaded; 1440 mm - Loaded
- Caliber: 110 mm
- Rate of fire: 1 rpm
- Muzzle velocity: 125 m/s
- Effective firing range: 190 m
- Maximum firing range: 400 m
- Sights: Iron sights

RPO "Rys" (Russian: реактивный пехотный огнемёт «Рысь» (РПО «Рысь»), Rocket-propelled Infantry Flamethrower "Lynx") is a napalm rocket-propelled grenade launcher classified as a flamethrower by the Russian military. The RPO first entered service in 1975, and was intended to replace the obsolete LPO-50 flamethrower. Later it was replaced by the RPO-A Shmel.

== Description ==
The RPO Rys shares some parts with RPG-16, like the firing mechanism, however, The weapon is breech loaded. It also resembles the RPG-29, and can be mistaken for it. While classified as a flamethrower, it does not function like one in the "traditional" sense, as it does not spew out a stream of burning napalm from the barrel; instead, it fires capsuled, solid propellant, napalm filled rockets. The rockets are filled with 4 liters of napalm and have a muzzle velocity of around 125 m/s with an effective range of 190 meters. The RPO also has a bipod for stability, and a maximum sighting range of 400 meters.

== Operational history ==
In 2017, the OSCE mission to Ukraine reported that used RPO Rys containers were seen at a Donetsk People's Republic training area, near Oleksandrivsk.

== See also ==
- RPO-A Shmel: Thermobaric rocket launcher / flamethrower
- MGK Bur: Miniaturized thermobaric rocket launcher / flamethrower

== Users ==
- Russian Federation
- USSR
