= Type 78 =

Chinese recoilless gun

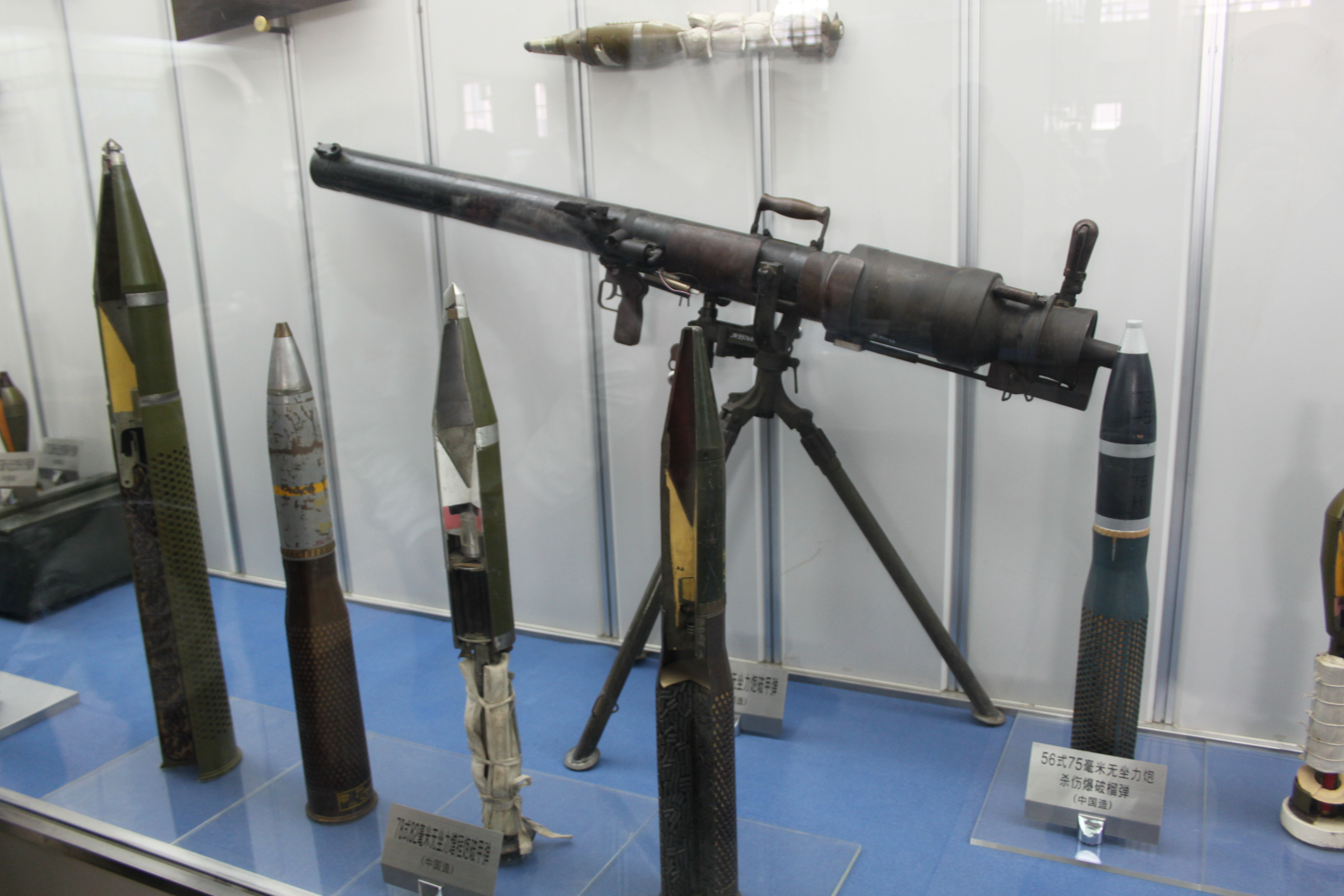
Type 78 and its ammunitions

The Type 78 is a Chinese-made 82 mm smoothbore recoilless gun designed to provide a rapid, direct fire support to infantry against hard targets such as light tanks, armoured vehicles, and bunkers. The Type 78 is an improved version of the Type 65 with some modifications. Type 78 has been equipped by the PLA Ground Forces in significant numbers and is still serving with some class-B units and reserve forces today. The Type 78 is being replaced by the more capable Type 98.

== Design ==
The Type 78 consists of the barrel, optical aiming sight, tripod, and accessories. The gun can be fired either with the help of a tripod or on the gunner’s shoulder. There are two types of rounds available: high-explosive (HE) with a maximum range of 300m (Type 65) or 500m (Type 78).

== Users ==
- China
- Sudan
