= FHJ-84 =

Type 84 Individual Anti-Chemical Rocket Launcher
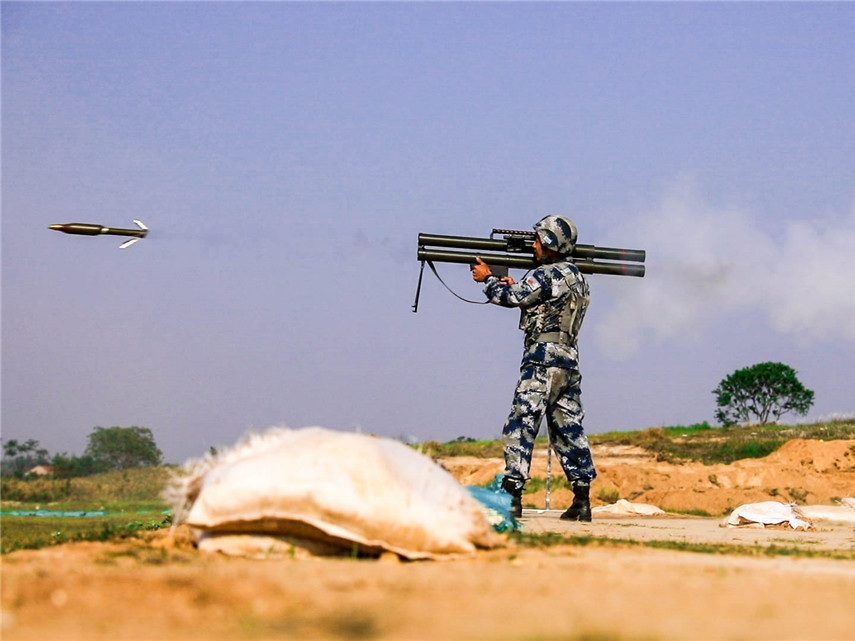
- Type: Multi-shot incendiary rocket launcher
- Place of origin: China

Service history
- In service: 1984 - present
- Used by: See Operators

Production history
- Designer: Norinco
- Designed: 1980s
- Manufacturer: Norinco
- Produced: 1984 - present

Specifications
- Mass: Unloaded - 8 kg (18 lb); Loaded - 18 kg (40 lb)
- Length: 1,200 mm (3 ft 11 in)
- Crew: 1-2
- Cartridge weight: 5 kg (11 lb) - each rocket (2 shots)
- Caliber: 62 mm (2.4 in)
- Rate of fire: 6 rpm
- Muzzle velocity: ~126 m/s
- Effective firing range: 25 m (82 ft) to 200 m (660 ft)
- Maximum firing range: 500 m (1,600 ft) (area)
- Feed system: Detachable twin-rocket casing
- Sights: Optical 1x day sight

The FHJ-84 (Chinese: 84式62毫米单兵防化火箭; pinyin: 08 Shì 62 háomǐ dānbīng fánghuà huǒjiàn; lit. 'Type 84 Individual 62 millimeter anti-chemical rocket') is an over/under twin-barreled 62 mm incendiary rocket launcher developed by Norinco for the People's Liberation Army. Type 84 features two tubes that can be loaded with 62mm incendiary and smoke rockets. The FHJ-84 is China's attempt to develop an alternative to World War II era flamethrowers.

== History and development ==
The FHJ-84 is a double-barrel rocket launch designed to fire incendiary and smoke rounds. The launcher is developed from the short-lived Type 70 rocket launcher, with the same firing tube and reloading mechanism.

== Variants ==
FHJ-84
Original variant.
FHJ-01
Improved variant with new type of incendiary ammunition and a better day sight.
FHJ-02
7-tube 62mm remote-controlled multiple launch rocket system.

== Operators ==
- China: People's Liberation Army

== See also ==
- DP-64 Nepryadva - outwardly similar looking Russian weapon
- M202A1 FLASH
- RPO-A Shmel (Bumblebee)
