= Type 70 rocket launcher =

- Type: Rocket Launcher
- Place of origin: China

Service history
- In service: 1970

The Type 70 rocket launcher (Chinese: 70式62毫米火箭筒) is a Chinese 62 mm (2.4 in) rocket launcher developed by Norinco. The rocket launcher was developed in 1970 and put into limited service with the People's Liberation Army.

According to Janes, it was formerly offered for export outside China.

== History ==
China was one of the primary users and manufacturers of the RPG-2. After the Sino-Soviet Split, China was unable to acquire weapons designs from the Soviet Union, one of which was the latest rocket launcher at the time, RPG-7. During the Vietnam War, China was able to acquire the M72 LAW through their ally North Vietnam. The PLA believed the M72 LAW was suitable for the Chinese military doctrine, and tasked Chinese engineers to develop a similar rocket launcher.

The Type 70 was only put into limited service, as the project suffered a long development time and production issues. The widely manufactured Type 69 RPG meant Type 70 was no longer needed. The design was not abandoned, but served as the basis for the double-barrel FHJ-84 rocket launcher, featuring two 62-millimeter tubes derived from the Type 70.

The Type 70 later influenced the design of the PF-89.

== Design ==
Type 70 is not a copy of the M72, though the two share some similarities. Type 70 utilizes a two-piece launch tube design, instead of the telescopic configuration of the M72 LAW. The front part is the launcher tube, while the rear part is a self-contained ammunition tube. Both tubes are made with plastic-impregnated fiberglass and connected by a rotary latch mechanism. The coupling section was reinforced with aluminum, and covers made with bakelite are used for sealing on both tubes. Type 70 uses electronic ignition (not percussion ignition of the M72), so a copper terminal jumper is installed inside the rear sealing as a short circuit safety.

The Type 70's rocket design is similar to the LAW, which is fin-stabilized without self-rotation. The difference is that the Type 70 uses a piezoelectric fuse. The rocket has an effective range of 200 m (220 yd) and a maximum range of 800 m (870 yd). The armor penetration is rated at 345 mm (13.6 in). Aside from the regular high-explosive anti-tank (HEAT) round, an airburst fragmentation round with bouncing detonation fuse was developed as well.

As the Type 70 is a single shot rocket launcher, it can be used by one person.

== Variants ==
- Type 70
- Type 70-1: Improved version

== Bibliography ==
- Jones, Richard D.; Ness, Leland S., eds. (2010). Jane's Infantry Weapons 2010-2011. Jane's Publishing. ISBN 978-0710629081.
