= RPO-A Shmel =

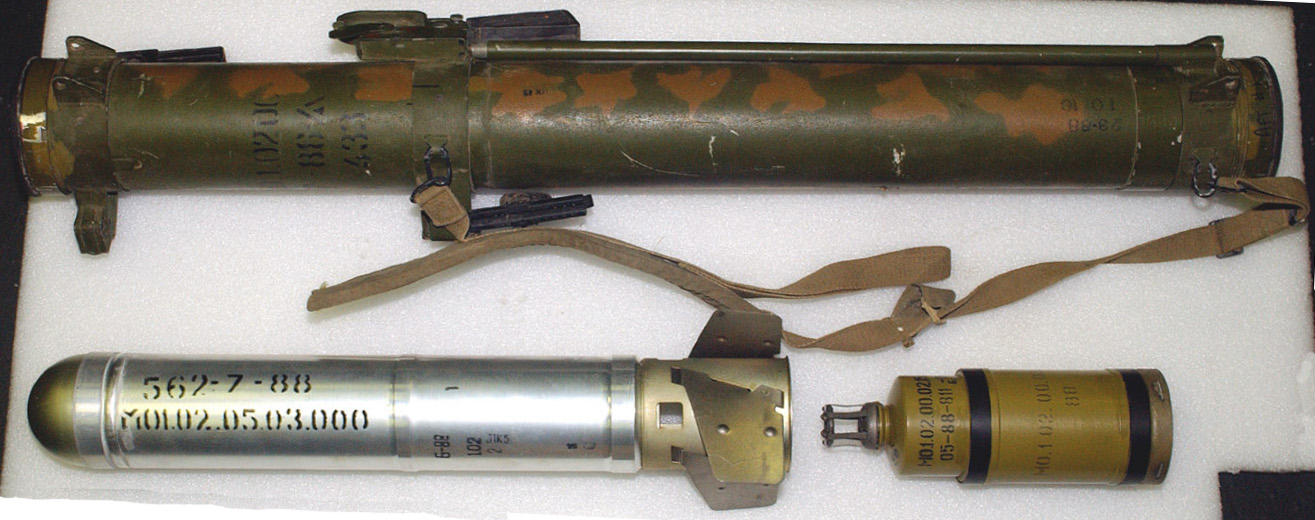
- RPO-Shmel and Launcher
- Type: Rocket launcher
- Place of origin: Soviet Union

Service history
- In service: 1986–present
- Used by: See Operators
- Wars: Soviet–Afghan War; War in Afghanistan; First Chechen War; Second Chechen War; Kivu conflict Insurgency in Jammu and Kashmir; Syrian Civil War; War in Iraq (2013-2017); Russo-Ukrainian War; Gaza war

Production history
- Designer: KBP
- Designed: 1984
- Manufacturer: KBP
- Produced: Late 1980s
- Variants: See Variants

Specifications
- Mass: 11 kg (24 lb)
- Length: Launcher: 920 mm Rocket: 700mm
- Caliber: 93 mm
- Muzzle velocity: 125 ±5 m/s
- Effective firing range: 20 m – 1000 m (sighting range is 600 m); RPO-M is 1700 m (sighting range is 800 m)
- Sights: iron

The RPO-A Shmel (Russian: реактивный пехотный огнемёт РПО-А «Шмель», lit. 'rocket-propelled infantry flamethrower "Bumblebee"') is a man-portable, single-use, rocket-assisted thermobaric weapon. While its name directly translates to flamethrower (and it is classified as such in Russian military documents), the RPO-A Shmel is more accurately described as a thermobaric weapon. The Shmel is designed, produced and exported by the Russian Federation and previously by the Soviet Union. It entered service with the Soviet Armed Forces at the end of the 1980s as the successor for the RPO Rys.

== Description ==
The RPO-A is a single-shot, self-contained tube shaped launcher that operates much like the RPG-18 anti-tank launcher, a sealed tube, carried in a man-pack in pairs. The same person can remove the tube, place it in firing position, and launch the weapon without assistance. After launch, the tube is discarded. All models are externally similar.

Designed to defeat concealed enemy firing positions, disable lightly armored vehicles and destroy enemy manpower. The aiming range with a diopter sight is 600 meters, with an OPO optical sight – 450 m, OPO-1 – up to 850 m.

=== Ammunition ===
Each weapon contains a single rocket, of which there are three varieties. The basic rocket is the RPO-A, which has a thermobaric warhead and is designed for attacking soft targets under moderate cover. The RPO-Z is a incendiary warhead (from зажигательный, zazhigatel'nyy, 'incendiary') designed to spread fire and ignite targets. The RPO-D is a smoke warhead (from дымовой, dymovoy, 'related to smoke').

== Variants ==
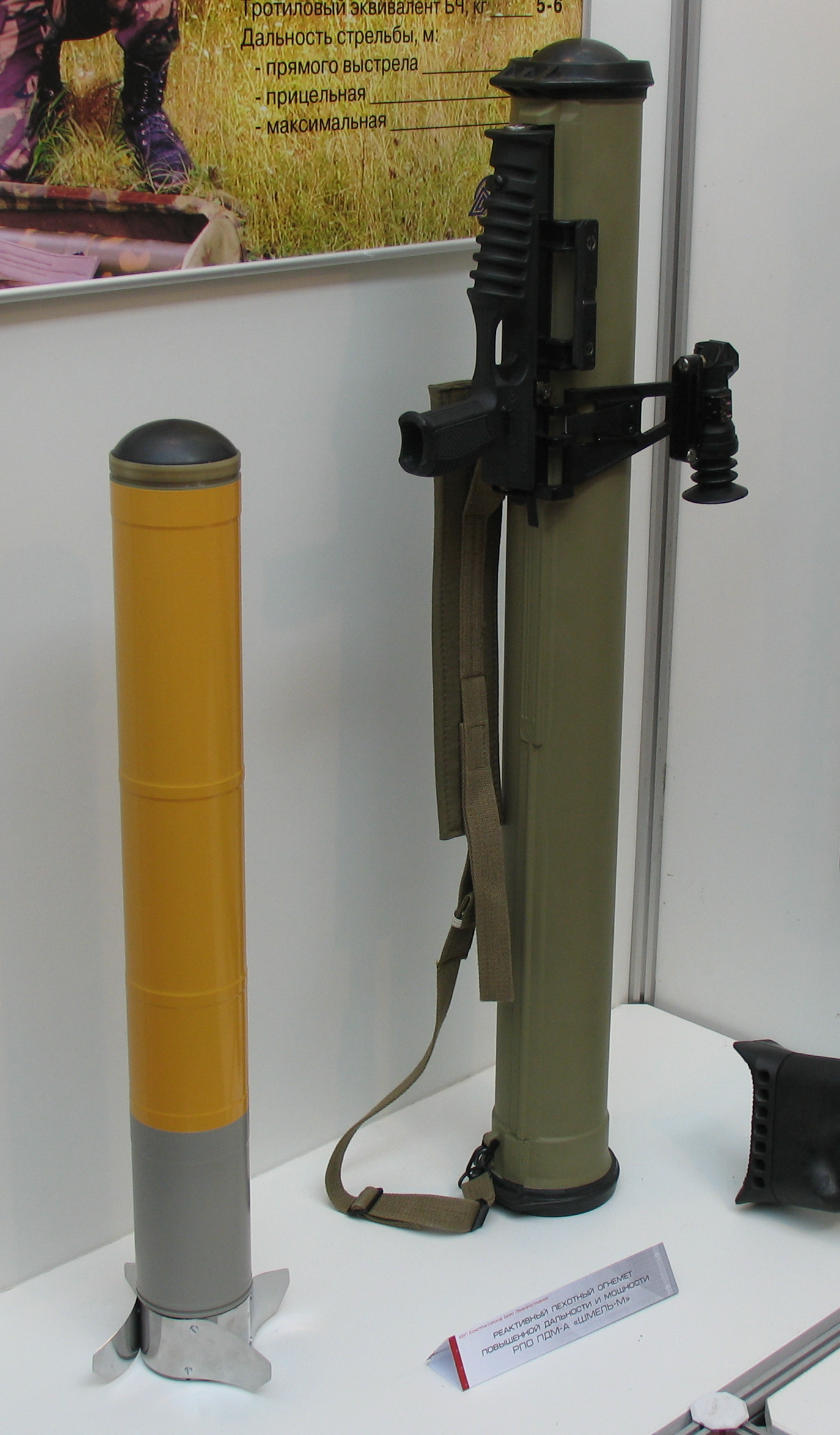
RPO PDM-A Shmel-M

An updated development is the improved RPO-M "Shmel-M" that was shown for the first time at Eurosatory 2006. This version is similar to the original weapon, but has a calibre of 90 mm, a weight of 8.8 kg (19 lb), and an overall length of 940 mm. The system has better ergonomics, an improved rocket, and better ballistics and terminal effects. It consists of a disposable launching tube attached to a reusable fire control unit that includes the pistol grip, electronic trigger and safety, and a folding base with an optical sight and additional rail for an infrared/night vision sight. Effective range is 300 m, maximum sighting range is 800 m, and maximum range is 1,700 m. The thermobaric warhead's blast effect is equivalent to 5.5 kg (12 lb) of TNT, comparable to a 155 mm artillery shell. The "Shmel-M" is also known as RPO PDM-A (from Повышенной Дальности и Мощности, Povyshennoy Dal'nosti i Moshchnosti, 'enhanced range and power') and is produced for the local and export markets. A version with a mechanical sight was adopted on 24 December 2003.

The MRO-A is a smaller development of the RPO-series with caliber reduced to 72.5 mm, similar to the RShG-2. It is self-contained, disposable, single-shot recoilless launcher with an overall length of 900 mm, weight of 4.7 kg (10 lb), and has a folding forward grip. The sights are RPO-based, with a fixed front and folding ladder-type diopter rear, giving an effective range of 90 m and maximum range of 450 m. The MRO-series includes different versions, again based on RPO versions: MRO-A thermobaric; MRO-D white phosphorus smoke; and MRO-Z incendiary. It was adopted by the Russian army around 2002 and issued to chemical troops to supplement the larger RPO-A.

MGK Bur (Russian: малогабаритный гранатомётный Комплекс «Бур», romanized: Malogabaritnyy Granatomotnyy Kompleks "Bur" — Compact Grenade-launching System "Auger") is a 62 mm version of the RPO-M consisting of two major components: the disposable launch tube and reusable fire control unit. Described as "the most compact grenade launcher in the world," the weapon has an overall length of 742 mm and weighs 5 kg (11 lb). Loaded tubes weigh 3.5 kg (7.7 lb) and can fire thermobaric (blast yield similar to 6 kg (13 lb) of TNT, or a 122 mm artillery rocket) or fragmentation warheads. The fire control unit is the same one used on the RPO-M, weighing 1.5 kg (3.3 lb) and enabling ranges of 25–650 m with the baseline day sight; night and thermal systems are also available. Maximum range is 950 meters, with a firing mechanism service life of at least 500 rounds. It can be fired in confined spaces with a volume of at least 30 cubic meters. As of October 2014, it has been accepted into service and serial production has been started.

== Service history ==
RPO weapons have seen use by the Soviet Army in Afghanistan and by both the Russian state forces and Chechen resistance forces in the First and Second Chechen Wars. In September 1997, a large number of RPO were included in an arms airdrop to pro-Nguesso forces during the Second Republic of Congo Civil War. On September 3, 2004, Russian forces used RPO-A Shmel as part of the effort to end the Beslan school siege. On 9 August 2014, during the war in Donbas, the Ukrainian border checkpoint of Milove was attacked using RPO thermobaric weapons. The main building was hit by five incendiary rockets. It was used by Indian Army in September 2016 for surgical strike against insurgents in Pakistan-administered Kashmir successfully. It was also used on 8 February 2017 in Ukraine, killing Donetsk People's Republic commander Mikhail "Givi" Tolstykh. The munition has seen wide use by the Russian Federation in its 2022 invasion of Ukraine.

On October 2, 2023, an attack by presumed PKK members was foiled in the Turkish capital city of Ankara. One attacker was armed with an M4 Carbine and an RPO launcher.

On December 2, 2023, Izz ad-Din al-Qassam Brigades, the military wing of Hamas, announced their first deployment of the weapon during the Gaza war to target a specialized Israeli force taking cover in a house in Jabalia, Northern Gaza.

== Operators ==
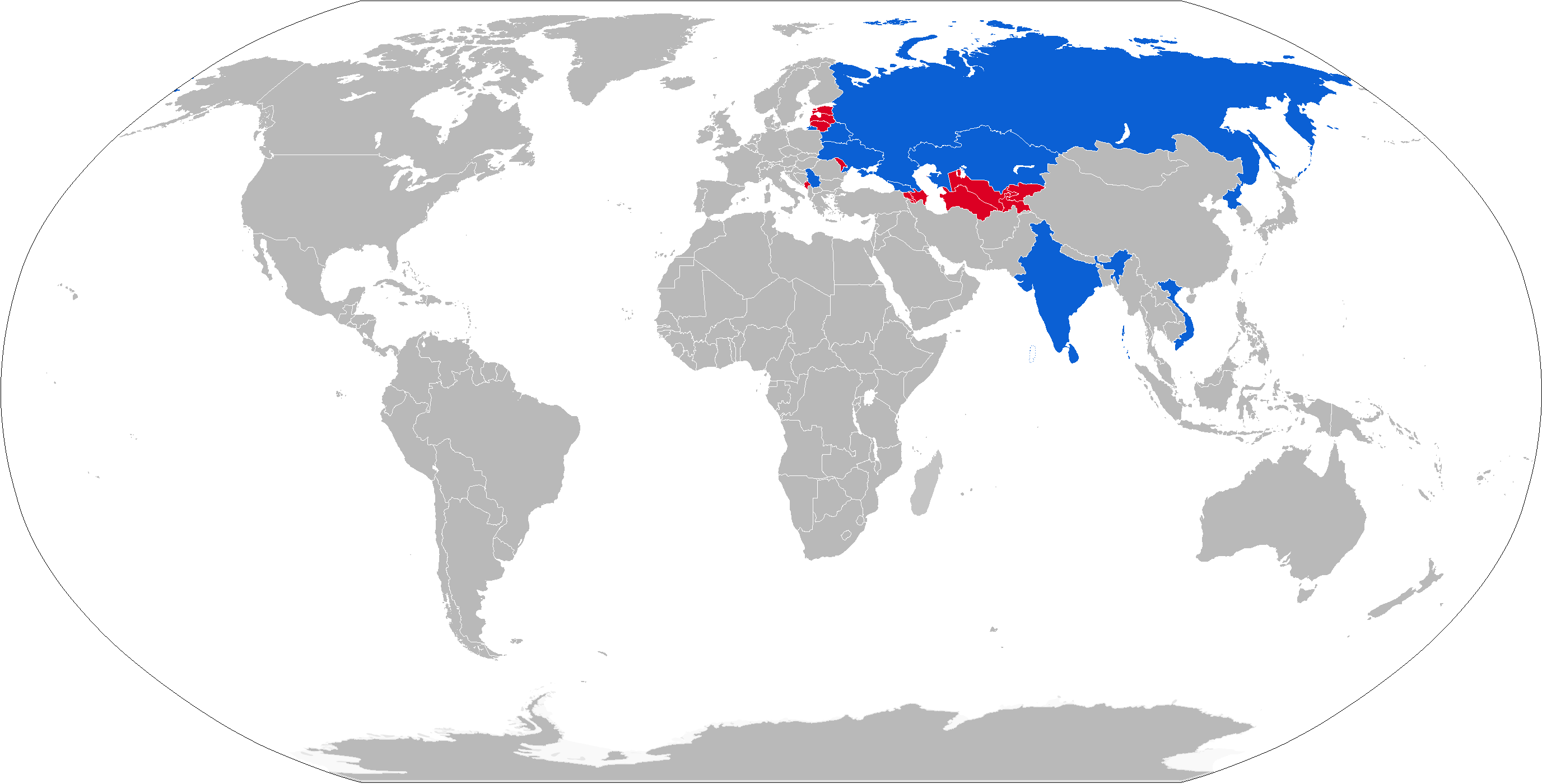
Operators Current Former

=== Current operators ===
- Afghanistan
- Armenia
- Belarus The PDM-A Priz is replacing the RPO-A Shmel
- China Produced under license in the name PF-97
- Republic of Congo

- Cobra militia received several RPO-A in September 1997

- Democratic Forces for the Liberation of Rwanda
- Fiji
- Georgia
- India
- Russia
- Sri Lanka
- Syria
- Ukraine
- Vietnam is producing RPO-Z domestically at Z115 factory.

=== Former operators ===
- USSR
- Federal Republic of Yugoslavia
- Chechen Republic of Ichkeria

== See also ==
- BMO-T, a specialized heavy armored personnel carrier based on the T-72 tank and intended to carry a squad of soldiers armed with RPO launchers
- FHJ-84 — an over/under two-shot variant from China
- M202 FLASH — a similar weapon developed by the US Army
- List of Russian weaponry
- Russian NBC Protection Troops — main user.
