= Hanyang HY4260 =

Chinese transporter erector launcher

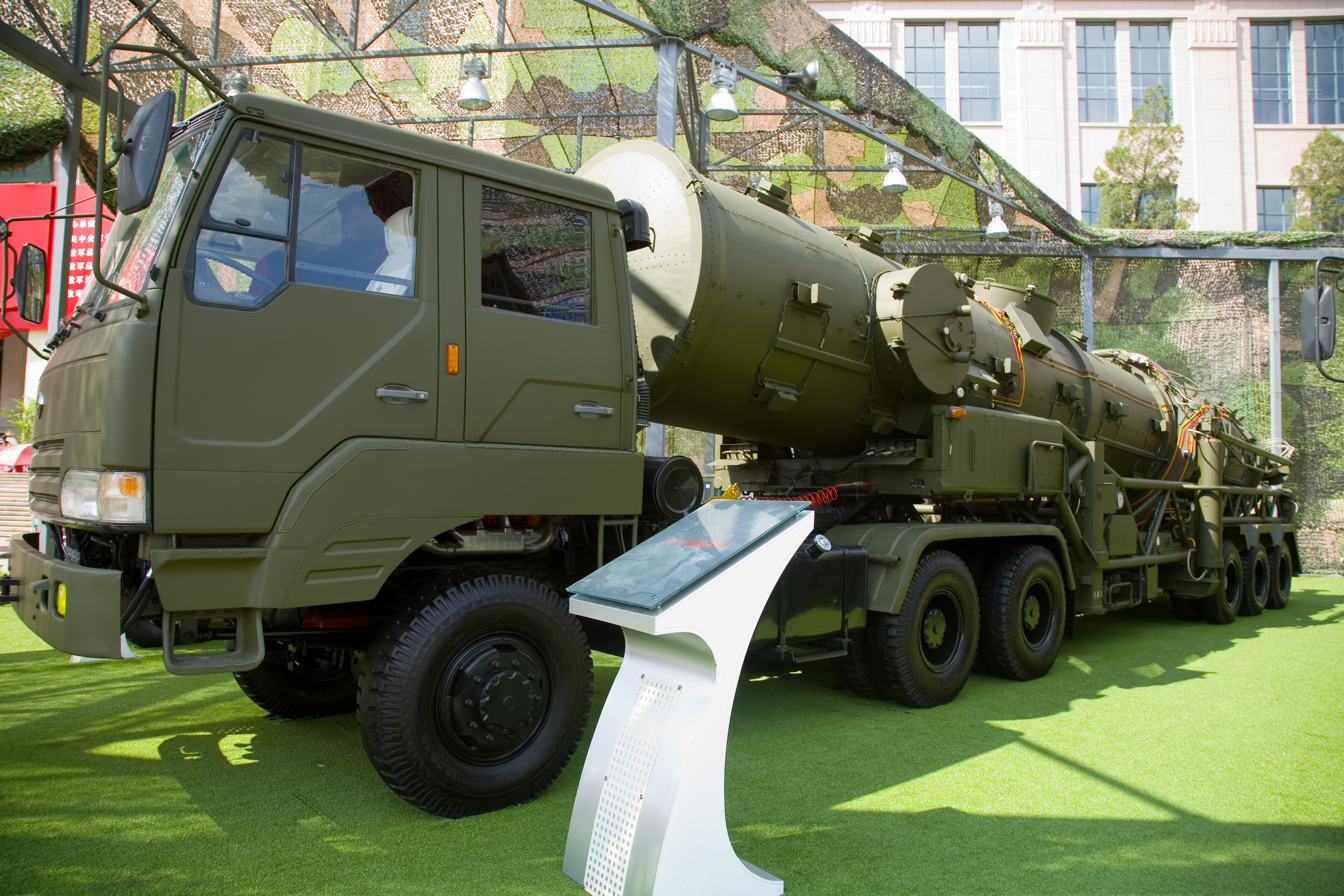
- The HY4260 carrying a DF-21 IRBM.
- Type: 6x6 tractor truck
- Place of origin: China

Service history
- Used by: People's Liberation Army Rocket Force

Production history
- Designer: Hanyang Special Purpose Vehicle Institute
- Manufacturer: Hanyang Special Purpose Vehicle Institute

Specifications
- Mass: 11.5 t (empty)
- Length: 7.46m
- Width: 2.58m
- Height: 3.05m
- Crew: 1+4
- Engine: Deutz BF12L413F diesel 435 hp (324 kW)
- Payload capacity: 50-75 tons
- Operational range: 1,000 km (621 mi) loaded
- Maximum speed: 64 km/h (40 mph)

The Hanyang HY4260 is a model of military tractor trucks developed, produced and used by the People's Republic of China. These vehicles are primarily used to mount Beijing's ballistic missile family and are used in conjunction with other transporter erector launchers, to further bolster China's ballistic missile capabilities.

Likewise, its much larger sibling truck, the Hanyang HY4330, is able to carry DF-31 (both DF-31A and DF-31B variants) intercontinental ballistic missiles, and functions in a similar nature to conventional TELs.

== Description ==
The Hanyang HY4260 is a model 6x6 tractor truck produced and developed by the Hanyang Special Purpose Vehicle Institute. Like other Chinese TELs such as the WS2600, the HY4260 primarily carries the DF-21 intermediate range ballistic missile, which is towed on the back on a semi-trailer. Due to its Deutz BF12L413F turbocharged diesel engine, the HY4260 could tow semi-trailers with a weight ranging from 50-75 tons in weight.

It transports these ballistic missiles from their shelters and storage bases to the launch sites. Due to its high mobility, the HY4260 could leave its base of storage and operate in remote areas on high alert, greatly increasing the difficulty in being detected by hostile forces.

Although the HY4260 has off-road capabilities, it is primarily designed to operate on hard conventional surface roads.

== See also ==
- WS2300
- WS2400
- WS2500
- WS2600
- HTF5680A1
- Hanyang HY4330
