= Hanyang HY4330 =

Chinese transporter erector launcher

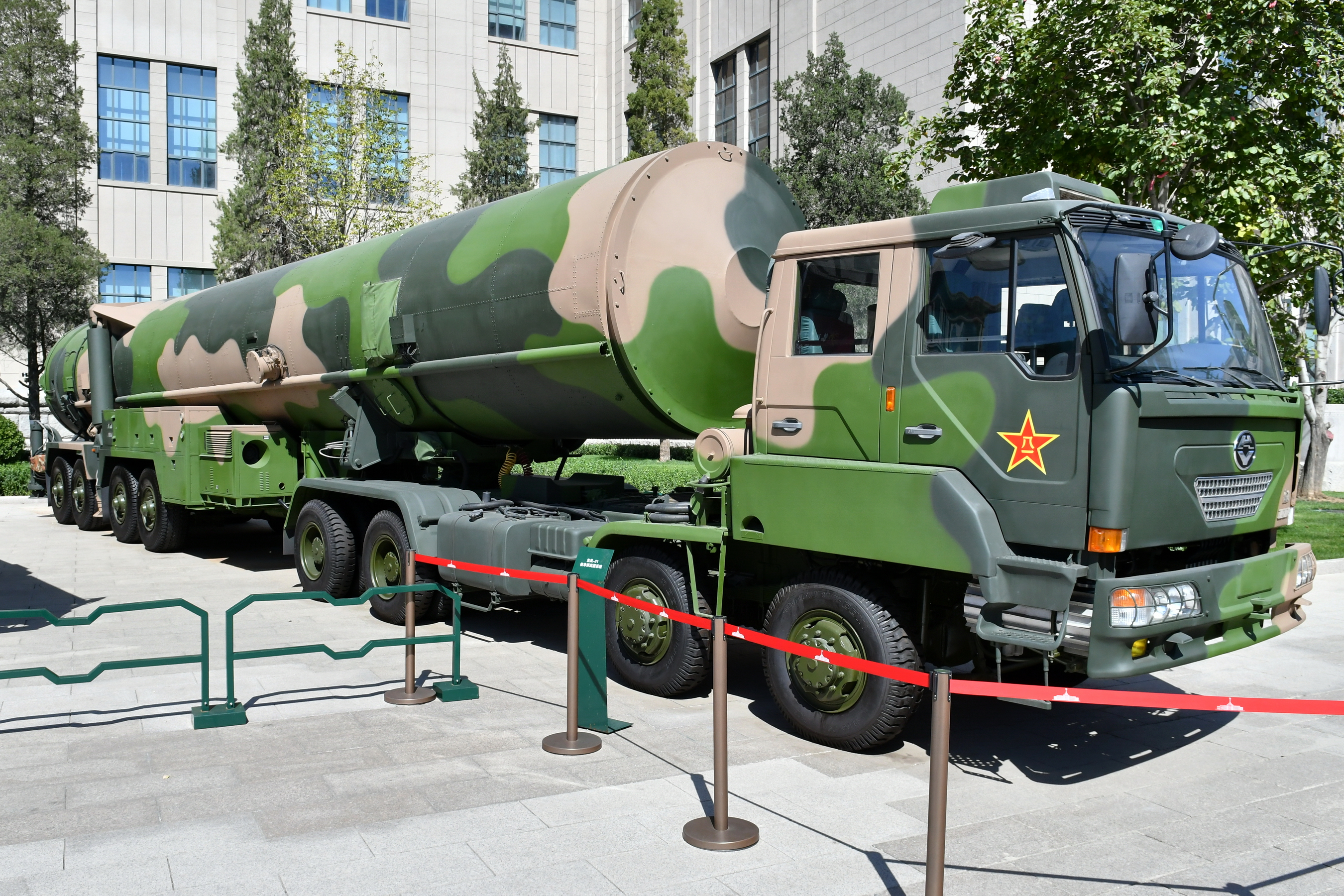
- The HY4330 carrying a DF-31 ICBM.
- Type: 8x8 tractor truck
- Place of origin: China

Service history
- Used by: People's Liberation Army Rocket Force

Production history
- Designer: Hanyang Special Purpose Vehicle Institute
- Manufacturer: Hanyang Special Purpose Vehicle Institute

Specifications
- Mass: 16 t (empty)
- Length: 9.4m
- Width: 2.8m
- Height: 3.75m
- Crew: 1+4
- Engine: Deutz BF12L513C diesel 540 hp (400 kW)
- Payload capacity: 60 tons
- Operational range: 1,000 km (621 mi) loaded
- Maximum speed: 69 km/h (43 mph)

The Hanyang HY4330 is a large model of military tractor trucks developed and produced by the Hanyang Special Purpose Vehicle Institute, which in turn is used by the People's Republic of China. These trucks behave essentially like conventional transporter erector launchers and as such, are used primarily to offer Beijing second strike nuclear capabilities; bolstering China's ballistic missile capabilities.

Likewise, its smaller sibling truck, the Hanyang HY4260, carries the versatile DF-21 intermediate range ballistic missiles, which has an anti-ship ballistic missile capabilities.

== Description ==
Unlike the HY4260, the Hanyang HY4330 is a much larger 8x8 tractor vehicle. This increased size allows the HY4330 to tow the much larger DF-31A road-mobile intercontinental ballistic missile. Due to this, the Hanyang Special Purpose Vehicle Institute developed this truck specifically for this role. It became a successor to an older Hanyang HY4301 which towed the more conventional DF-31 base-ICBM model.

The HY4330 became operational in 2007 and is implemented specifically to the Second Artillery Corps of the People's Liberation Army Rocket Force. Despite its payload capabilities and operational history, the HY4330 has not been produced in any significant quantities.

As the HY4330 and the smaller HY4260 is powered by the Deutz BF12L513C turbocharged diesel engine, the HY4330 could carry a maximum payload of 60 tons whilst maintaining a higher speed with a maximum travel range of 1000km, vastly improving its mobility and complicating detection.

== See also ==
- WS2300
- WS2400
- WS2500
- WS2600
- HTF5680A1
- Hanyang HY4260
