= HTF5980 =

Chinese missile launcher

- HTF5980 sketch carrying a DF-41 ICBM.
- Type: 16x16 superheavy strategic truck/transporter erector launcher
- Place of origin: China

Service history
- Used by: PLA Rocket Force

Production history
- Designer: Taian Special Vehicle Company
- Manufacturer: Taian Special Vehicle Company

Specifications
- Mass: 130-150 t (with DF-41)
- Length: ~21 metres (69 ft)
- Width: 5m
- Height: 4m
- Crew: 1+5
- Engine: Deutz turbocharged diesel 517 hp (386 kW)
- Payload capacity: rated at 80 tons
- Suspension: 16x16 wheeled
- Operational range: 800 km (497 mi) loaded
- Maximum speed: 65 km/h (40 mph)

The Taian HTF5980 is a large transporter erector launcher used exclusively to carry the DF-41 Intercontinental Ballistic Missile. It is the largest known TEL used by the People's Liberation Army Rocket Force and the most powerful in terms of carrying capacity.

== Description ==
The Taian HTF5980 is a 16x16 TEL that specialises in carrying superheavy ICBMs like the aforementioned DF-41s or sometimes the DF-31AG. It is the first eight-axis self-propelled chassis made in China, equipped with a multi-axis steering system to meet the requirements of high manoeuvrability for a ground vehicle of such size.

Like most TELs made from Taian, it uses an integral welded structure frame, an oil-gas spring independent suspension and a multi-axle group steering and drives in order to achieve a high enough mobility to suit the PLARF.

One key difference of the HTF5980 in comparison to its smaller cousin, the HTF5680A1, is the introduction of a split-cab design. This was in order to accommodate the much larger missile canister of the DF-41 when at rest.

== Variants ==
The HTF5980 itself comes in two varieties, the HTF5980A and HTF5980B, which are the launch vehicles and transport vehicles respectively.

== See also ==
- TAS5380
- WS2400
- MAZ-7310
- HEMTT
- WS2600
- WS21200
- WS51200
