= People's Liberation Army Navy Coastal Defense Force =

One of the five branches of the PLA Navy

- 中国人民解放军海军岸防兵; Zhōngguó Rénmín Jiěfàngjūn Hǎijūn Ànfángbīng
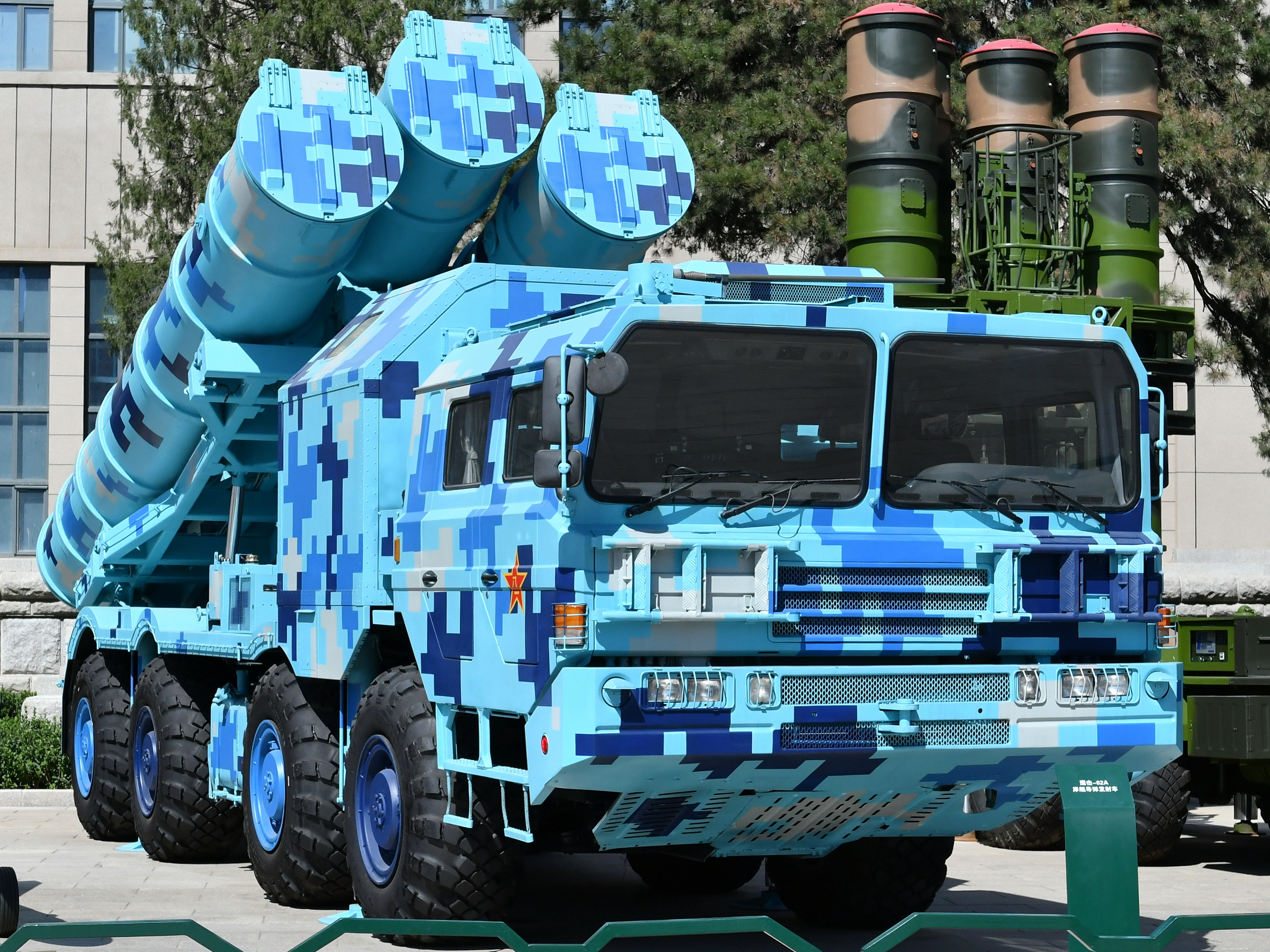
- YJ-62A on a TA580/TAS5380
- Founded: 1950; 76 years ago
- Country: China
- Allegiance: Chinese Communist Party
- Branch: People's Liberation Army Navy
- Type: Coastal artillery
- Role: Anti-surface warfare
- Part of: People's Liberation Army
- Engagements: Chinese Civil War; First Taiwan Strait Crisis; Battle of Yijiangshan Islands; Second Taiwan Strait Crisis
- Website: http://www.81.cn/hj/node_61998.htm?yikikata=df6f8c1a-f1fec863b04c01d4d89bc2da9d69891a

The People's Liberation Army Navy Coastal Defense Force (PLANCDF) is one of five branches of China's People's Liberation Army Navy. The Coastal Defence Force has artillery and anti-ship missile components. The artillery component has become obsolete and been mainly replaced by the missile component - the PLAN Coastal Defense Missile Force (CDMF) - which continues to be developed. The CDMF deploys mobile land-based short- and medium-range missiles supporting territorial defense and regional power projection.

== History ==
The limited Chinese economy and strength of the PLAN fleet through much of the 20th century made coastal defense reliant on land-based systems.

When the Korean War broke out on 26 June 1950, United States's President Harry Truman announced the "neutralization of the Straits of Formosa", which meant stationing the Seventh Fleet in the Taiwan Strait and an effective blockade of the Chinese coast.

In response, the Central Military Commission issued an order in July 1950 to establish a Coastal Artillery School. The Sixth Artillery Division of the Northeast Military Region was sent south from Shenyang to the former German barracks in Woniushan, Qingdao, together with a group of artillery detachments from all over the PLA, including 16 surrendered members of the Kuomintang Navy. This hastily assembled contingent was established as the Naval Coastal Artillery School on 24 August 1950. The commander of the Sixth Artillery Division Wang Xiaoming served as the principal. On 21 October 1950, 258 graduates formed the first coastal artillery battalion in Tuandao, Qingdao. They were equipped with 130mm shore guns.

From 1954 to 1955, the new unit participated in the battle for sea control in Eastern Zhejiang and the battle of Yijiangshan Islands. In 1955, the CDF took over the Soviet artillery left behind at Lüda (Dalian) after the Soviets returned Port Arthur and Dalian (which they had occupied since 1945) to the Chinese. By the end of 1955, the CDF had 19 artillery battalions with 343 Soviet, American, and Japanese artillery pieces, and units were deployed in 13 coastal bases and ports, 4 river estuaries, 3 straits and waterways, and 18 islands. On 24 December 1958, the first shore-to-ship missiles were introduced from the Soviet Union, the SSC-2B "Samlet"

Coastal artillery were engaged during the Second Taiwan Strait Crisis.

The first Chinese missile introduced to the PLANCDF was the short-ranged HY-2 "Silkworm", typically launched from fixed positions. In the 1980s, China's operational concept shifted from "near-coast defense" to "near-seas active defense" and the PLANCDF received YJ-8 anti-ship cruise missiles (ASCM). PLANCDF units were integrated into the PLAN multi-domain operations by receiving targeting data from non-PLANCDF radars. The PLANCDF's coastal defense mission remained significant through the 1990s, after which the increasing capability of the other PLA branches to conduct extended operations at long-range made it less important. The PLANCDF continued to upgrade its weapons and equipment to enable longer-range fires in joint PLA operations.

In the 2000s, the PLANCDF began forming mobile ASCM units with new missiles and upgrading older static operational areas with facilities to support mobile units. The first mobile unit, the 1st Coastal Defense Missile Regiment, nicknamed the 1st Coastal Thunderbolt Regiment, was created before 2009.

Mobile units are designed to employ hit and run tactics, firing a salvo of missiles and then retreating to cover.

== Structure ==
CDMF regiments are deputy division or regiment leader grade units subordinated to Naval Bases or Maritime Garrison District Headquarters.

The primary level of command required to launch the missiles is located at the battalion level to allow for retaliatory strikes if the regiment level command is destroyed, and also to allow for a greater level of independence for units.

Fixed regiments have a command, control, and fires company, a weapons and technology preparation company, and a logistics company. Launching positions are rail-based transporter erector launchers (TEL) emerging from bunkers. Most fixed companies have been phased out. Road-mobile regiments have multiple launch battalions and a technical battalion. The launch battalions have a company of missile batteries, a command and control company, and a support company.

Regiments operate from areas called "barracks". Regiments may operate from multiple barracks. Protected underground facilities are common at modern barracks to reduce vulnerability to preemptive strikes and counterattack.

In 2023, the International Institute for Strategic Studies identified three regiments with a total of 72 YJ-12 or YJ-62 missiles. Independent battalions may exist.

- Eastern Theater Command Navy
  - 1st CDMF Regiment (Unit 92383) - Headquarters in Minhou county, Fuzhou; Also known as the "1st Coastal Thunderbolt Regiment" (海岸霹雳第一团)
  - 2nd CDMF Regiment (Unit 92768) - Headquarters in Chenghai district, Shantou
  - 3rd CDMF Regiment (Unit 92706) - Headquarters in Beilun district, Ningbo
  - Up to 3 independent CDMF battalions in Pingtan County, Dongtou district and Putuo District
- Northern Theater Command Navy
  - 11th CDMF Regiment (Unit 91980) - Headquarters in Zhifu district, Yantai, 2 batteries in Rongcheng city, Weihai
  - Tiger Tail Coastal Defense Artillery
  - 1 fixed CDMF regiment (unverified) in Lushunkou district, Dalian
- Southern Theater Command Navy
  - 12th CDMF Regiment (Unit 91172) - Stationed in Tianya district, Sanya
  - 1 CDMF battalion on Woody Island, Sansha

Facilities for one CDMF battalion each are located in the north Subi Reef, south Subi Reef, Fiery Cross Reef, and Mischief Reef.

== Equipment ==
=== Missiles ===
As of 2024, the PLANCDF is primarily armed with YJ-12B and YJ-62 anti-ship missiles.

=== TELs ===
The Wanshan 2400 TEL carries three YJ-62s in cylindrical tubes. The Wanshan 2600 TEL carries three YJ-12Bs in square tubes.

=== Firearms ===
The QBZ-95 is used for base security.

== Sources ==
- Rice, Daniel C. (2024-04-08). "The PLA Navy Coastal Defense Missile Force" (PDF). Air University (AU).
