= WS21200 =

Chinese transporter erector launcher

- The WS21200 shares the same baseline design with its sister counterpart, the WS51200. (Missile excluded)
- Type: 16x16 heavy strategic truck/transporter erector launcher
- Place of origin: China

Service history
- Used by: Pakistan Army: Pakistan Army Strategic Forces

Production history
- Designer: Wanshan Special Vehicle
- Manufacturer: Wanshan Special Vehicle

Specifications
- Mass: 42 t (empty)
- Length: 20m
- Width: 3.3m
- Height: 3.3m
- Crew: 1+4
- Engine: Cummins KTTA19-C700 turbocharged diesel engine 700 hp (520 kW)
- Payload capacity: 80 tons
- Suspension: 16x16 wheeled
- Operational range: 1,000 km (621 mi) loaded
- Maximum speed: 60 km/h (37 mph)

The WS21200 is a large transporter erector launcher built and developed in the People's Republic of China. Like the WS51200, the WS21200 is not actually used by the People's Liberation Army Rocket Force, instead, the primary customer is Pakistan. The WS21200 along with the WS51200, is one of the larger TELs developed by the Wanshan Special Vehicle.

The size of the WS21200 allows it to carry ICBMs, however because of Pakistan's focus on regional deterrence and an absence of any ICBM, the WS21200 has been forced to mount medium-range ballistic missiles such as the Shaheen-III.

== Description ==
The Wanshan WS21200 is a Chinese/Pakistani 16x16 road-mobile TEL with a payload capacity of 80 tons thanks to the Cummins KTTA19-C700 turbocharged diesel engine. The 700 horsepower engine allows the WS21200 to drive at respectable speeds with a maximum range of 1000 km. Moreover, it grants the WS21200 some cross-country capabilities, further bolstering its mobility and evasiveness.

Similar to its North Korean sister counterpart, the WS51200, the WS21200 is used primarily by the Pakistani Air Force Strategic Command, which aims at improving Islamabad's nuclear first and second strike capabilities. Although it could theoretically mount an ICBM, Pakistan's limited resources in nuclear and ballistic missile technology and capability, means that the full potential for the WS21200 is regulated in carrying the Shaheen-III, Shaheen-II and MIRV capable Ababeel MRBMs.

== Operators ==
=== Current operators ===
Pakistan
Pakistan is the sole and current operator of the WS21200.

=== Former operators ===
China
While not an operator, China is the chief manufacturer of the WS21200 TEL.

== See also ==
- WS2300
- WS2400
- WS2500
- WS2600
- HTF5680A1
- WS51200
