= HTF5680A1 =

Chinese missile launcher

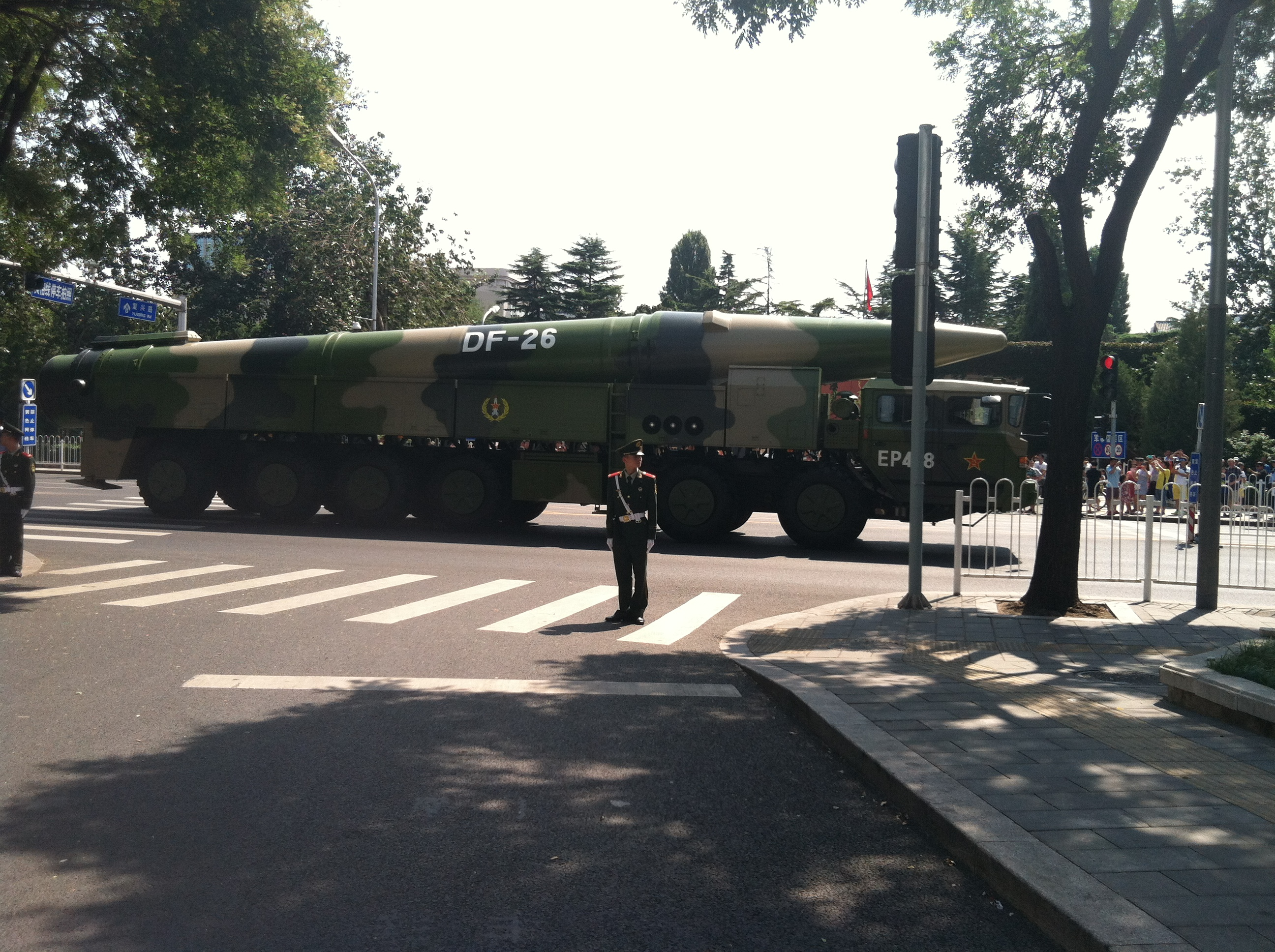
- HTF5680A1 transporting a DF-26 during China's parade in 2015.
- Type: 12×12 heavy strategic truck/transporter erector launcher
- Place of origin: China

Service history
- Used by: PLA Rocket Force

Production history
- Designer: Taian Special Vehicle Company
- Manufacturer: Taian Special Vehicle Company

Specifications
- Mass: 35 t (empty)
- Length: 17.6m
- Width: 3m
- Height: 3m
- Crew: 1+5
- Engine: Deutz turbocharged diesel 517 hp (386 kW)
- Payload capacity: Rated at 35 tons
- Suspension: 12x12 wheeled
- Operational range: 800 km (497 mi) loaded
- Maximum speed: 65 km/h (40 mph)

The Taian HTF5680A1 is a large transporter erector launcher with a 12x12 configuration. The vehicle comes in two primary variants. The conventional HTF5680 is a 12x12 flatbed vehicle for transport purposes. However, the most common and famous variant is the HTF5680A1 which carries ballistic missiles, most famously, the DF-26 intermediate-range ballistic missile.

== Description ==
The HTF5680A1 is a 35-ton TEL that is produced and developed by the Taian Special Vehicle company and is currently one of the main workhorse of the People's Liberation Army Rocket Force. The HTF5680A1 has a dimple on the roof in order to better accommodate the DF-26 ballistic missile it carries. Like the WS2600, the large size of the HTF5680A1, allows it to carry ballistic missiles with far heavier payloads. The most common type of ballistic missile the HTF5680A1 carries, are IRBMs such as the aforementioned DF-26.

The DF-26 missile itself is an IRBM with a 3,000–5,471 km (1,864–3,400 mi) range, and is capable of striking Guam. The warhead of the DF-26 have made it suitable for anti-ship usage.

Although it is meant for conventional hard surfaced roads, the HTF5680A1 has some degree of cross-country mobility and can travel over rugged terrain, which makes it less vulnerable to counterattacks and far more lethal.

== Variants ==
- HTF5680 - 12x12 flatbed transport variety

== See also ==
- HTF5980
- TAS5380
- WS2400
- MAZ-7310
- HEMTT
- WS2600
- WS21200
- WS51200
