= DF-41 =

Chinese intercontinental ballistic missile

- DF-41 missile on a HTF5980.
- Type: ICBM
- Place of origin: China

Service history
- In service: 2017
- Used by: People's Liberation Army Rocket Force

Production history
- Manufacturer: China Academy of Launch Vehicle Technology (CALT)

Specifications
- Mass: ~80,000 kilograms (180,000 lb)
- Length: 20–22 metres (66–72 ft)
- Diameter: 2.25 m (7 ft 5 in)
- Warhead: MIRV (up to 10 warheads)
- Engine: Three-stage Solid-fuel rocket
- Operational range: 12,000–15,000 kilometres (7,500–9,300 mi)
- Maximum speed: Mach 25 (31,425 km/h; 19,625 mph; 8,660 m/s)
- Guidance system: Inertial, likely with stellar and satellite updates
- Accuracy: ~100 m CEP
- Launch platform: Silo, road-mobile Transporter erector launcher, rail-mobile

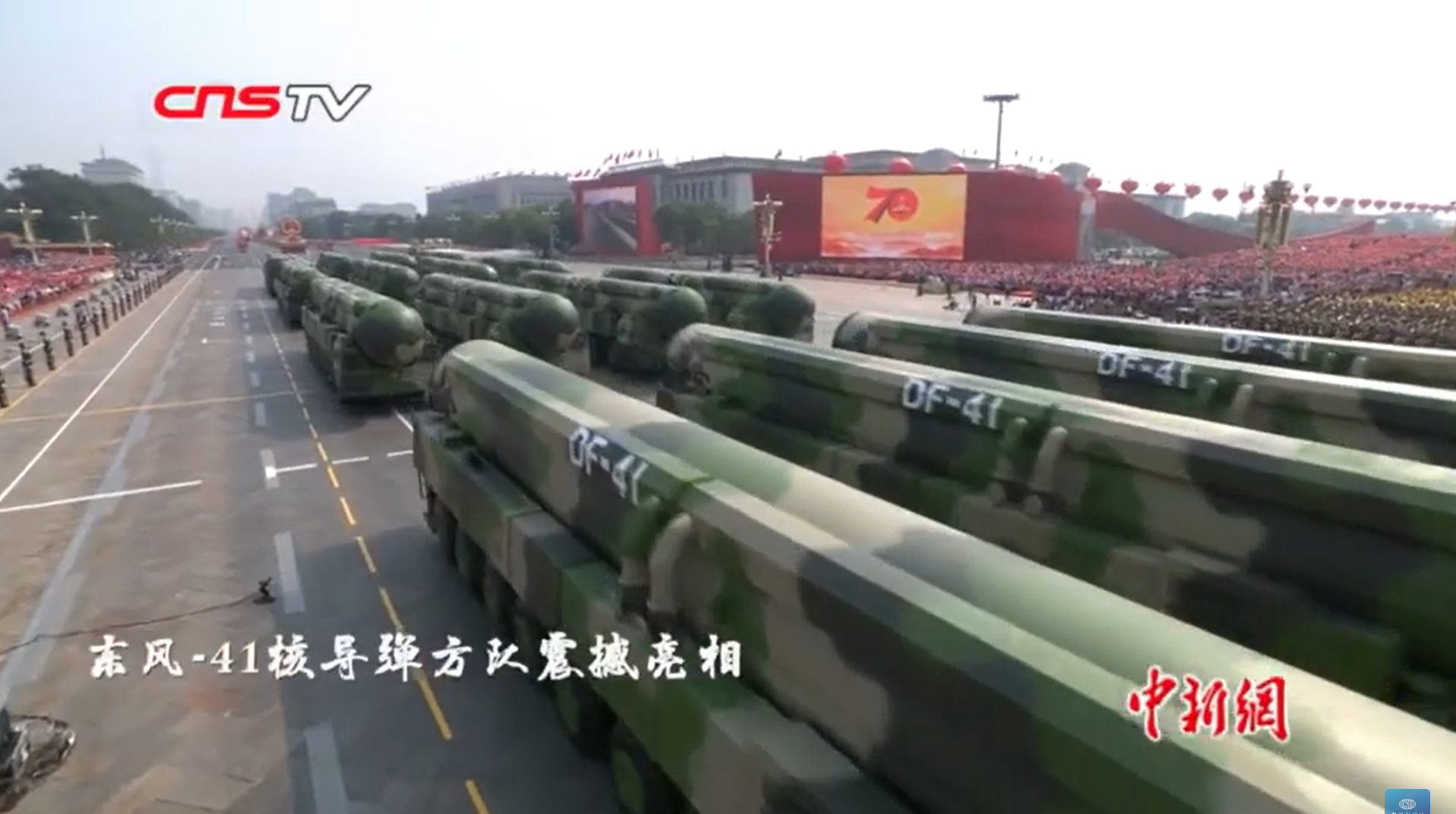
DF-41 at 70th anniversary of the People's Republic of China

The Dongfeng-41 or DF-41 (simplified Chinese: 东风-41; traditional Chinese: 東風-41; lit. 'East Wind-41'; NATO reporting name: CH-SS-20; previously reported as CSS-10) is a fourth-generation Chinese solid-fuelled road-mobile intercontinental ballistic missile operated by the People's Liberation Army Rocket Force (formerly the Second Artillery Corps). DF-41 is the fourth generation of the Dongfeng series strategic missiles developed by China. The missile was officially unveiled at the China National Day military parade on 1 October 2019.

== Design ==
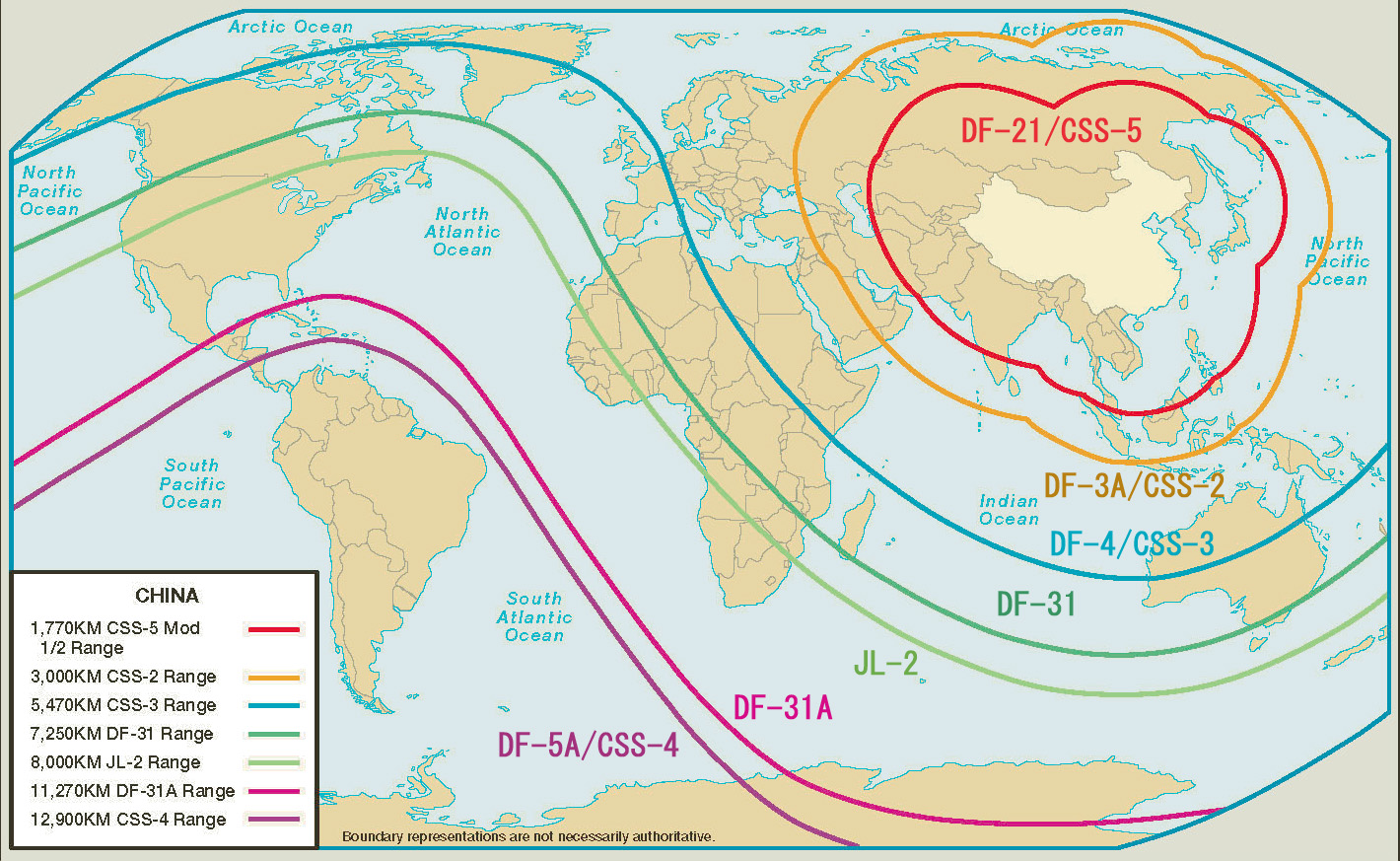
Range of various Chinese missiles (2007). The DF-41 has a similar range to the DF-5A (purple).

The missile reportedly has an operational range between 12,000 to 15,000 kilometres (7,500 to 9,300 mi). It is believed to have a top speed of Mach 25, and to be capable of MIRV delivery (up to 10). The development of the MIRV technology is reported to be in response to the deployment of the United States national missile defense system which degrades China's nuclear deterrence capability. The project started in 1986, and may now be coupled with the JL-3 program.

In 2018, Bulletin of the Atomic Scientists reported that the DF-41 could carry 3 to 8 warheads, but likely only three warheads with penetration aids. The Center for Strategic and International Studies reported a payload of ten warheads in 2024.

== Development ==
In April 2013, Taiwan's National Security Bureau head reported to the Legislative Yuan that the DF-41 was still in development, and not yet deployed.

The U.S. Department of Defense in its 2013 report to Congress on China's military developments made no explicit mention of the DF-41, but did state that "China may also be developing a new road-mobile ICBM, possibly capable of carrying a multiple independently targetable re-entry vehicle (MIRV)", which may refer to the DF-41.

In August 2014, China's Shaanxi Provincial Environmental Monitoring Center website accidentally published a news report about an environmental monitoring site for a DF-41 ICBM; the news report (and entire website) was taken down shortly after getting public attention.

In August 2015, the missile was flight-tested for the fourth time. In December 2015, the missile was flight-tested for the fifth time. In April 2016, China successfully conducted the 7th test of DF-41.

On January 23, 2017, China was reported to have deployed a strategic ballistic missile brigade to Heilongjiang province, bordering Russia, along with another strategic ballistic missile brigade deploying to Xinjiang.

In November 2017, just two days before U.S. President Trump's visit to China, the DF-41 was tested in the Gobi Desert.

On October 1, 2019, China publicly displayed the missiles for the first time on its 70th Anniversary National Day military parade.

== Rail-mobile versions ==
On 5 December 2015, China conducted a launcher test of a new rail-mobile version of the DF-41, similar to the Russian RT-23 Molodets.

== Silo-based versions ==
In 2021, the Federation of American Scientists (FAS) said China was building 120 missile silos for DF-41 near Yumen in Gansu and another 110 missile silos near Hami in Xinjiang.

A third site was discovered to be under construction near Ordos in Inner Mongolia in August, 2021. The new site will hold more than 100 ICBM.

Together, the three new missile bases will house 350 to 400 new long-range nuclear missiles, U.S. officials said.
