= WS51200 =

Chinese transporter erector launcher

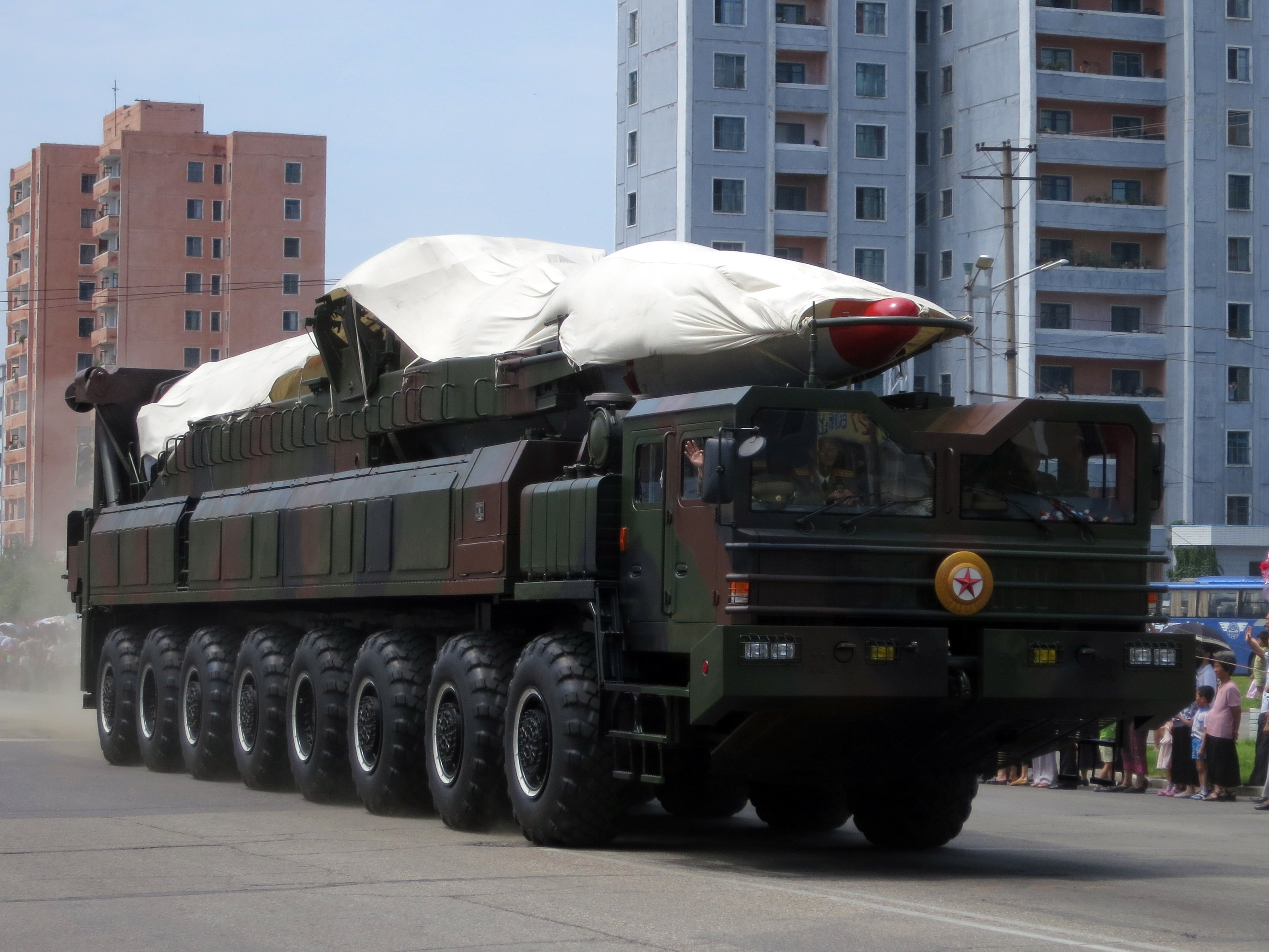
- WS51200 during the North Korean 2013 Victory Day.
- Type: 16x12 heavy strategic truck/transporter erector launcher
- Place of origin: China

Service history
- Used by: KPA Strategic Force

Production history
- Designer: Wanshan Special Vehicle
- Manufacturer: Wanshan Special Vehicle

Specifications
- Mass: 42 t (empty)
- Length: 20.11 m
- Width: 3.35 m
- Height: 3.35 m
- Crew: 1+4
- Engine: Cummins KTTA19-C700 turbocharged diesel engine 700 hp (520 kW)
- Payload capacity: 80 tons
- Suspension: 16x12 wheeled
- Operational range: 1,000 km (621 mi) loaded
- Maximum speed: 60 km/h (37 mph)

The WS51200 is an extremely large heavy goods vehicle built by Wanshan Special Vehicle in China, converted by the Democratic People's Republic of Korea into a single-use transporter erector launcher (TEL). The WS51200 is one of the largest in the WS family of transport trucks and TELs. The size of the WS51200 allows it to carry intercontinental ballistic missiles (ICBMs).

Despite being made in China, North Korea remains the only military user of these vehicles.

== Description ==
The WS51200 is a large 16x12 special wheeled transporter erector launcher which used some technology from the Belarusian Minsk Wheeled Tractor Plant's MZKT-79221 vehicle. Its large size allows the WS51200 to carry extremely heavy loads of up to 80 tons. As such, the WS51200 could easily mount a nuclear-tipped ICBM. Initial design with 8 axes (used for Hwansong-14) was extended to 9 axes(Hwasong-15) and 11 axes(Hwasong-17), this last displayed in Pyongyang Parade, 10-October-2020 with code number 323).

Unlike smaller Chinese TELs from Wanshan Special Vehicle, the WS51200 uses and is powered by the American Cummins KTTA19-C700 turbocharged diesel engine rather than the German-made Deutz turbocharged diesel engine. This more powerful engine gives the WS51200 700 hp and a maximum range of a 1,000 km. The TEL is steerable on its first 3 and last 3 axles, which significantly reduces turning radius and makes it surprisingly maneuverable despite its size.

== North Korean controversy ==
North Korea currently uses the WS51200 to mount the Hwasong-13 and the Hwasong-14 intercontinental ballistic missiles. In 2014, it was reported that North Korea imported eight civilian WS51200 vehicles from China. UN and Asean investigators have concluded that Chinese WS51200 trucks were legitimately exported to North Korea for timber transport, with the sales contract specifically prohibiting use of the vehicles for military purposes. However, North Korea illegally converted them into TELs by installing hydraulic gear and controls to erect a missile. Despite being converted to fire a missile, the truck would not be likely to survive damage from the rocket exhaust like a purpose-built TEL, making it a single-use launcher.

Despite this evidence, in 2017 the United States Treasury sanctioned Wanshan Special Vehicle, accusing the company of deliberately proliferating of weapons of mass destruction by aiding North Korea's mobile ballistic missile capability, but did not mention the vehicle's American Cummins engines.

== See also ==
- MZKT-79221
- WS2300
- WS2400
- WS2500
- WS2600
- HTF5680A1
- Hwasong-13
- Hwasong-14
- WS21200

== Operators ==
=== Current operators ===
North Korea
North Korea is the sole and current operator of the WS51200.

=== Former operators ===
China
While not an operator, The PRC is the chief manufacturer of the WS51200 TEL.
