= Missile turret =

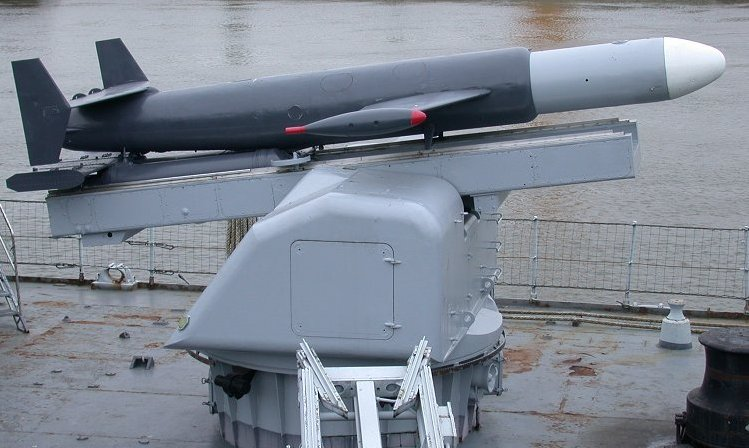
French Malafon Anti Submarine Missile on its turret

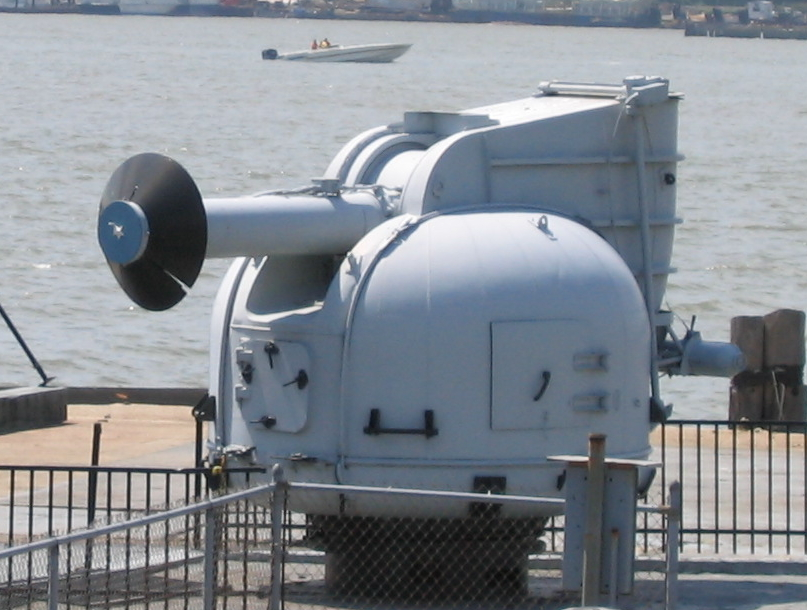
American RUR-4 Weapon Alpha naval Anti Submarine rocket launcher (1950s)

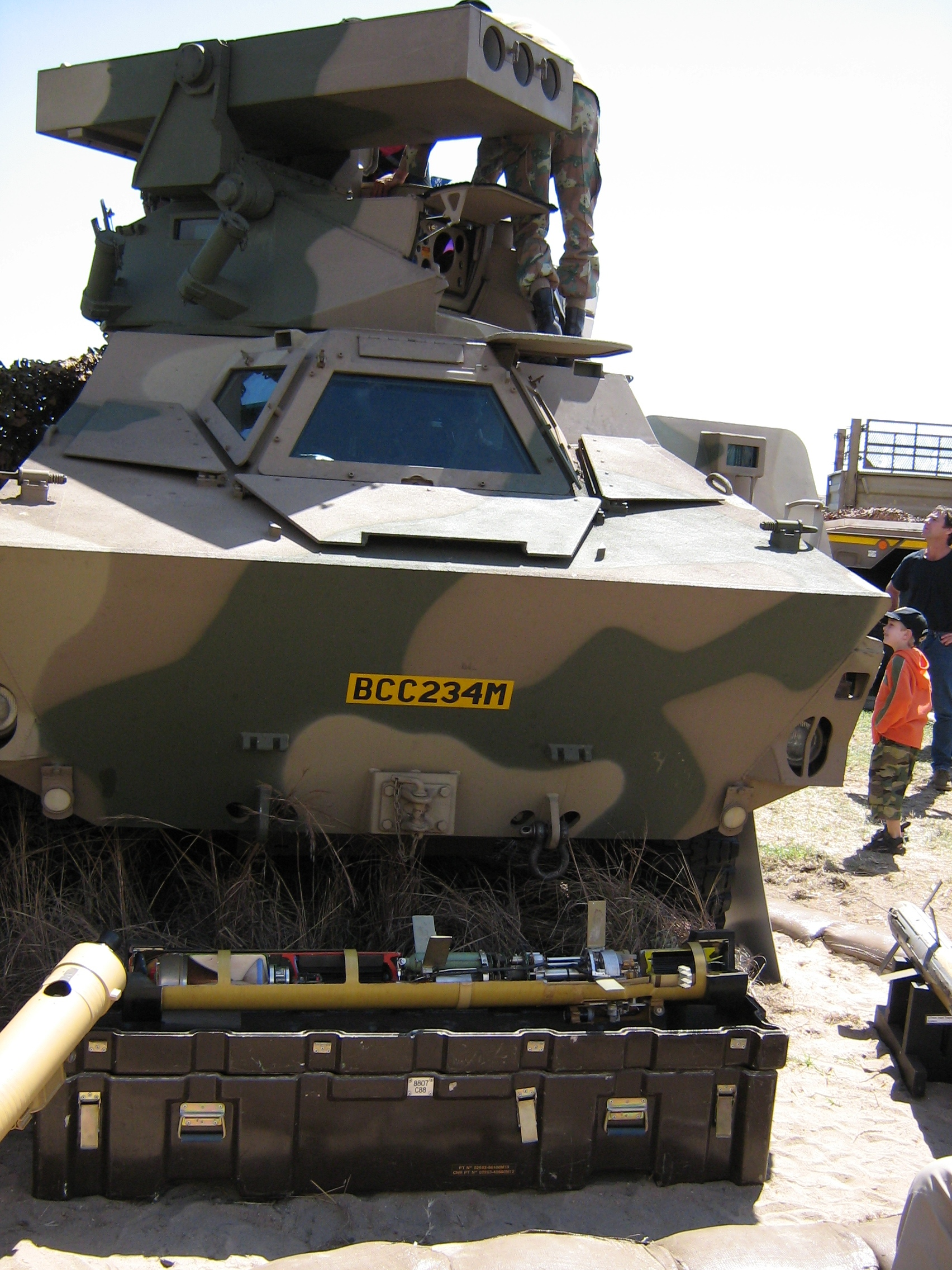
South African Ratel IFV with a missile turret for ZT3 Ingwe anti-tank guided missiles

A missile turret is a device used to aim missiles towards their targets before launch. Similarly to gun turrets they have been used on warships and vehicles on the ground. In most roles articulated missile launching systems on warships have been replaced by vertical launching systems. Ship-based missile systems often have centralised guidance systems which eliminate the need for targeting sensors on the turrets themselves.

The systems found on warships, especially those from the Cold War, may be termed as arm-launchers, either single- or twin-arm launchers, based on the amount of ready-to-fire missiles that they can hold.

== Examples ==
Aboard ships: Close-in weapon system

- Rolling Airframe Missile
- Crotale missile systems.
- Mk 10 GMLS for the RIM-67 Standard or RIM-2 Terrier missile
- Mk 12 GMLS for the RIM-8 Talos missile
- Mk 13 missile launcher
- Mk 26 launcher for the RIM-66 Standard or RIM-24 Tartar missile

On land:

- Air Defense Anti-Tank System
- MIM-72/M48 Chaparral
- Roland (air defence)
- Kub missile system
- Buk missile system

== Combined type ==
These are some weapon system that use a single turret for mounting a combination of guns and missiles:

- CADS-N-1 Kashtan, a Russian naval air defense system
- Tunguska-M1 Russia anti-air vehicle

== See also ==
- List of United States Navy Guided Missile Launching Systems
- Transporter erector launcher
