= MAZ-7907 =

Soviet transporter erector launcher

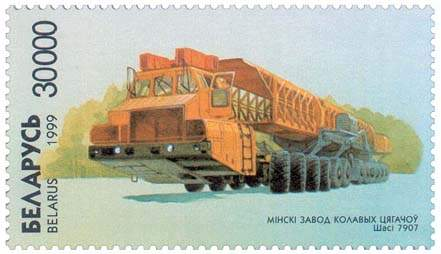
MAZ-7907 on Belarusian post stamp

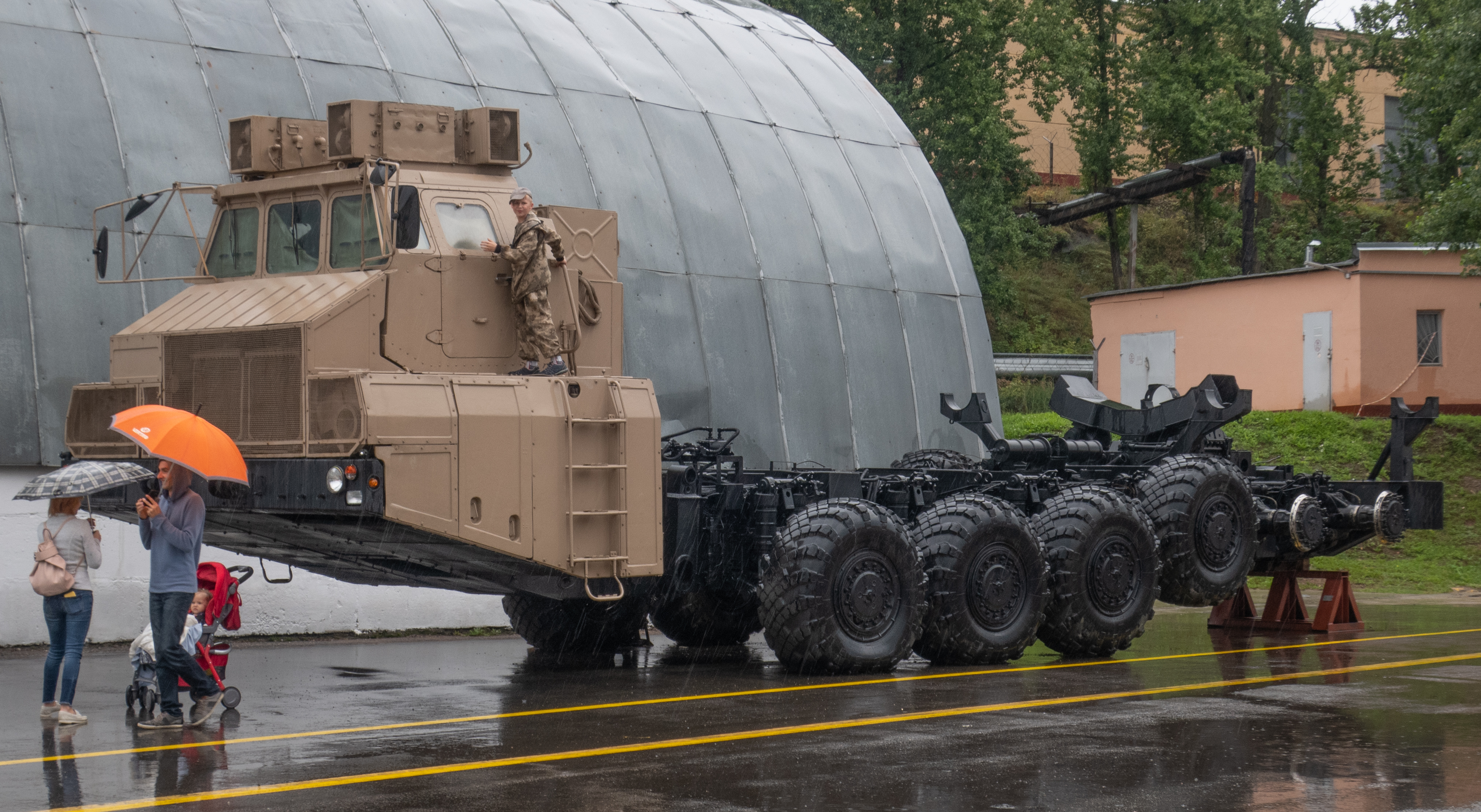
MAZ-7907 on MZKT open day 2019

MAZ-7907 (Russian: МАЗ-7907) is a Soviet army 24X24 transporter erector launcher prototype for the RT-23 Molodets ICBM designed and developed by the Minsk Automobile Plant (MAZ) in Belarus.

On August 9, 1983, the Soviet government issued a decree on the establishment of the RT-23 Molodets ICBM. The projected road-mobile RT-23 system was named "Celina-2" and received the industrial index '15P162'.

The first of two prototypes was assembled at MAZ in March 1985. The chassis had to be capable of transporting an RT-23 missile with a launch weight of 104.5 tons, a length of 22.6 m and a diameter of 2.4 m in a launch tube, and the launch support equipment.

The RT-23 was deployed as both a silo-based and a rail-mobile missile, but the road-mobile version was cancelled.

At least one of the prototypes seems to have been used after the collapse of the USSR for transportation of bridge parts and ships. Their fate is unclear. The split chassis can be seen on Google Maps images in 2020, which appears to show the location of the picture on the right dated 2019. A complete chassis appears on Google Maps near the location of the previously referenced image in 2024. An image posted on Google Maps at the Minsk Automobile Plant in 2016 shows a fully assembled chassis sitting in the parking lot. It is unclear if this is the same chassis as the one shown in the picture on the right.

The length of the vehicle is 28.1 m; the width 4.1 m and height 4.4 m. Two 1250 hp Klimov GTD-1250TFM gas turbine engines (from the T-80 tank) power an electric generator that sends power via turbine-electric transmission to 30 kW electric traction motors located at each one of the 24 wheels. Independent hydropneumatic suspension is used for each wheel.
