= DF-11 =

Chinese short-range ballistic missile

Dong Feng 11
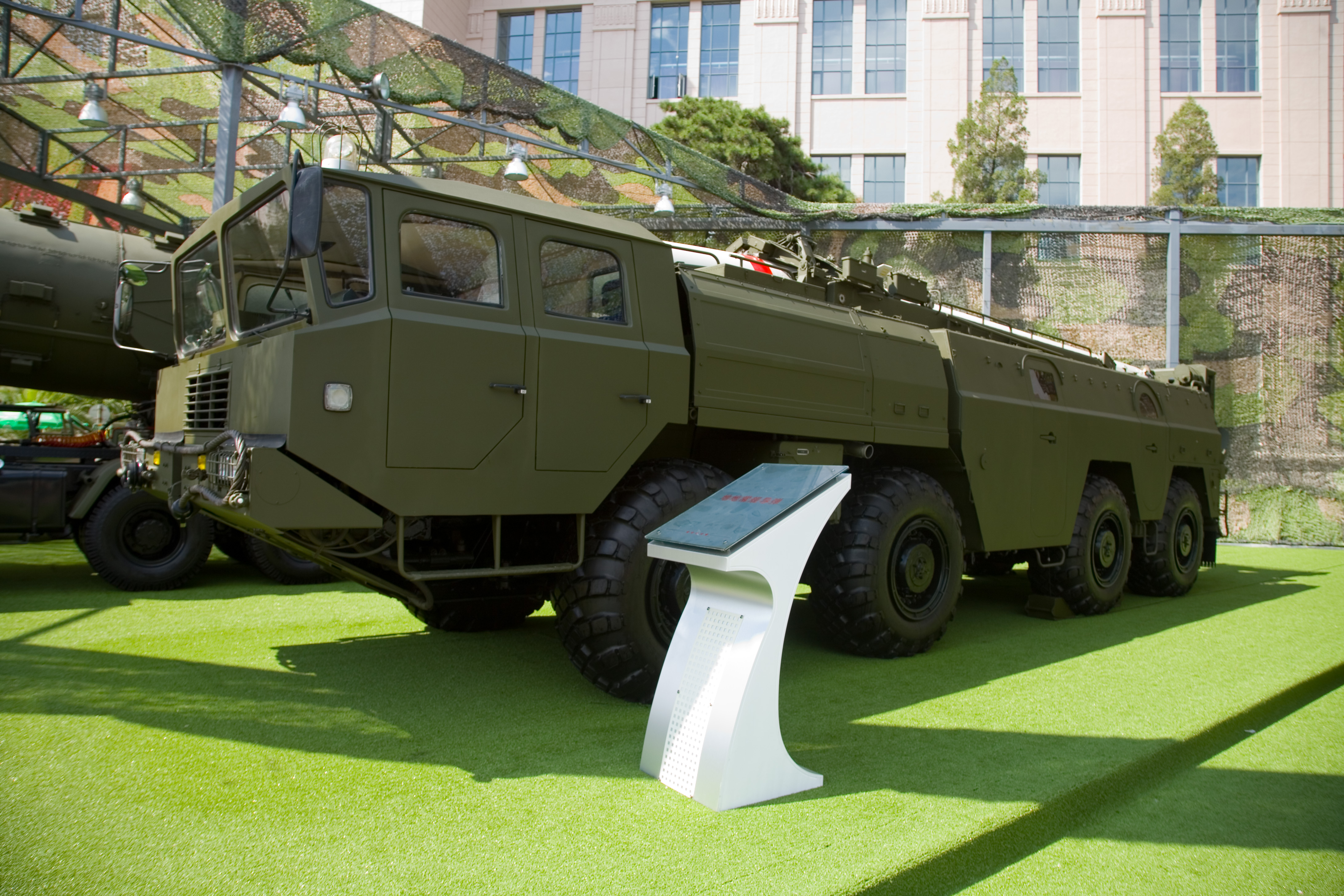
- Type: SRBM

Service history
- In service: 1992-present
- Used by: PRC; Pakistan; Myanmar (M-11)

Production history
- Manufacturer: Academy of Rocket Motors Technology

Specifications
- Mass: 3,800 kg
- Length: 7.5-8.5 m
- Diameter: 0.86 m
- Warhead: 500 kg: 2/10/20 kiloton nuclear warhead, fuel-air explosive (FAE), chemical, or submunition
- Engine: single-stage solid-propellant rocket
- Operational range: DF-11: 300+ km; DF-11A: 700+ km; DF-11AZT: 600 km
- Guidance system: Astro-inertial guidance (including ring-laser gyroscope) + Beidou satellite guidance
- Launch platform: Road-mobile TEL

The Dong-Feng 11 (a.k.a. M-11, CSS-7) is a short-range ballistic missile developed by the People's Republic of China.

== History ==
The DF-11 is a road-mobile short-range ballistic missile (SRBM) which began development in 1984 as the M-11, of which was led by the China Sanjiang Space Group (previously known as Base 066). It entered service with the PLA Second Artillery Corps in 1992. It is also been reported by US intelligence services that the missile was exported to Pakistan.

== Description ==
The DF-11 has range of 300 km with an 800 kg payload. An improved DF-11A version has increased range of >825 km. Unlike previous Chinese ballistic missiles, the DF-11 use solid fuel, which greatly reduces launch preparation time (15-30 min). Liquid-fueled missiles such as the DF-5 require up to 2 hours of pre-launch preparation. The upgraded DF-11B has been revealed as well. Estimates on the number of DF-11s in service vary between 500 and 600. The launch vehicle is made by Wanshan Special Vehicle. A bunker-buster variant with improved accuracy called the "DF-11AZT" has also been revealed.

	DF-11	DF-11A	DF-11AZT
Diameter	0.8 m (2.6 ft)		
Length	7.5 m (25 ft)	8.5 m (28 ft)	
Weight	3,800 kg (8,400 lb)	4,200 kg (9,300 lb)	
Payload	800 kg (1,800 lb)	500 kg (1,100 lb)	800 kg (1,800 lb)
Range	280–350 km (170–220 mi)	530–600 km (330–370 mi) or 700–825 km (435–513 mi) (Unconfirmed)	600 km (370 mi)
CEP	500–600 m	200 m (INS); 20–30 m (GPS)	50~100 m

== See also ==
- Sky Spear – (Taiwan)

Preceded by ?	DF-11 ?	Succeeded by ?
