= WS2300 =

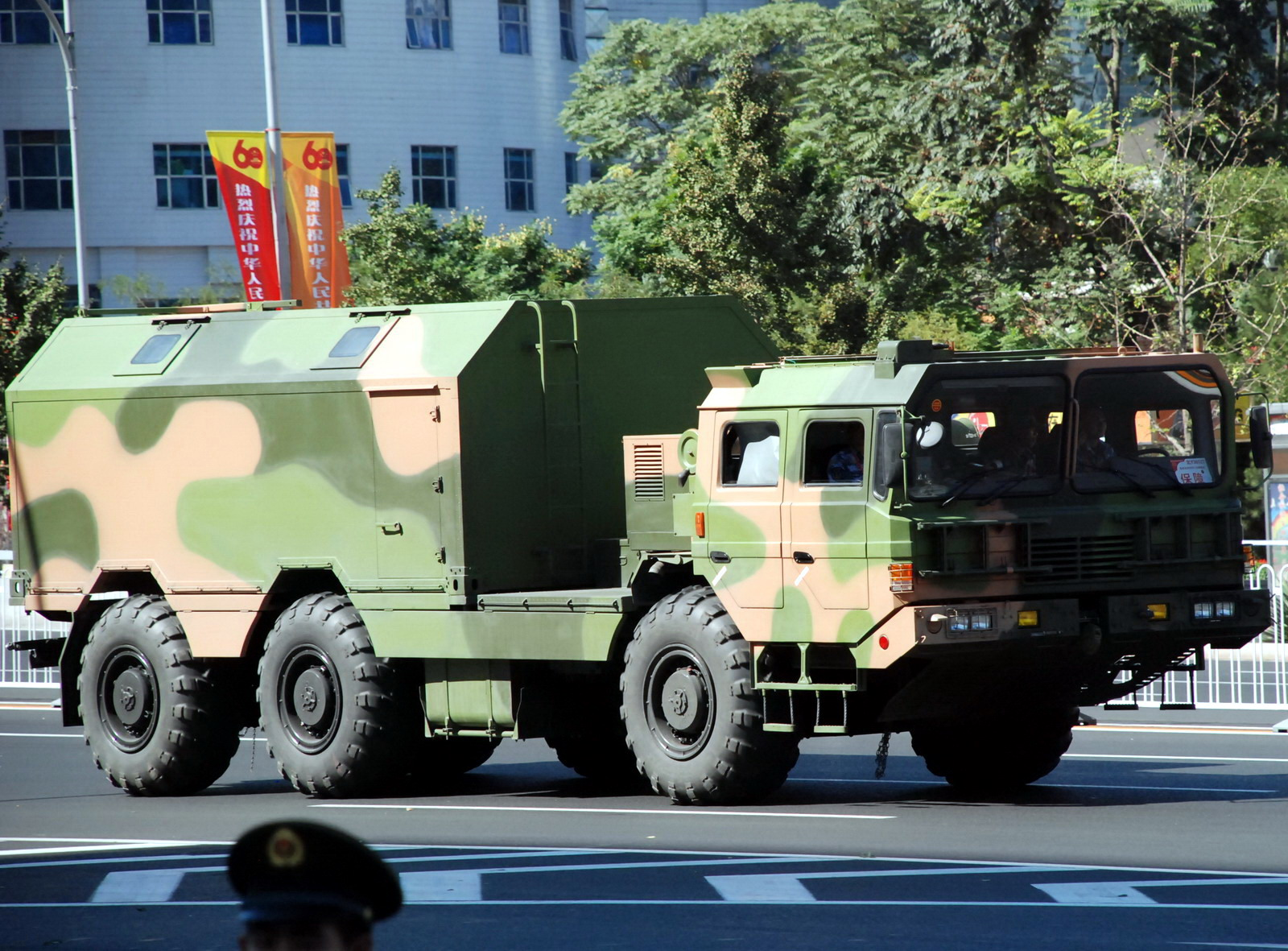
- WS2300 during China's 60th anniversary parade.
- Type: 6×6 tactical truck
- Place of origin: China

Service history
- Used by: PLA Rocket Force

Production history
- Designer: Wanshan Special Vehicle
- Manufacturer: Wanshan Special Vehicle

Specifications
- Mass: 14 t (empty)
- Length: 9.5 m
- Width: 3 m
- Height: 3 m
- Crew: 1+5
- Engine: Deutz diesel 325 hp (242 kW)
- Payload capacity: 16 tons
- Operational range: 800 km (497 mi) loaded
- Maximum speed: 80 km/h (50 mph)

The WS2300 is a general purpose 16 tonne 6x6 special heavy duty truck made by Wanshan Special Vehicle Factory and used by the People's Liberation Army of the People's Republic of China.

== Description ==
A much smaller 6x6 version of the WS2400, the WS2300 is a comparatively light weight transporter erector launcher (TEL) whose operation commence in 1999. The WS2300 is therefore, one of the most ubiquitous Chinese TELs in operation within the People's Liberation Army Rocket Force.

The WS2300, due to its much smaller profile, could only carry a payload totaling 16 tons. Its heavy-duty nature as a high mobility vehicle and a TEL allows the WS2300 to mount two P-12 short-range ballistic missiles. The WS2300 also comes in a command post and workshop variant depending on the logistical needs.

Like most Chinese TELs, the WS2300 is powered by German technology such as the Deutz turbocharged diesel engine which allows the WS2300 to develop a 325 hp. It is able to carry up to five passengers plus the driver due to its 4-door cab.

== Variants ==
- WS2400
- WS2500
- WS2600
- WS21200
- WS51200
