= Wanshan Special Vehicle =

Chinese truck and bus manufacturer

Wanshan Special Vehicle, officially Hubei Sanjiang Space Wanshan Special Vehicle Co., Ltd (Chinese: 湖北三江航天万山特种车辆有限公司), is a truck and bus manufacturer in China. Its WS-series military trucks are used by the People's Liberation Army; it is a major manufacturer of transporter erector launchers (TEL).

== Organisation ==
Wanshan, (Chinese: 万山; lit. 'ten thousand mountains'), is based in Wuhan in Hubei province. The "Wanshan Special Vehicle Factory" was state-owned; it was restructured into Hubei Sanjiang Space Wanshan Special Vehicle Co., Ltd., which is, in turn, part of China Aerospace Sanjiang Space Co. Ltd (中国航天三江集团), which started in 1969 as a military unit producing missiles. Sanjiang Space Group is a subsidiary of China Aerospace Science and Industry Corporation (CASIC). As of December 2012, Wanshan's assets were around RMB1.1 billion.

Wanshan has benefited from technology transfers from Deutz, Caterpillar, Isuzu and ZF Friedrichshafen. Several of its trucks (but not more modern designs such as the WS2180 or the WS2250) have been based on MZKT designs, some of which have been updated with more modern engines and transmission systems.

As of September 2009, the director was Cao Jingwu.

== Products ==
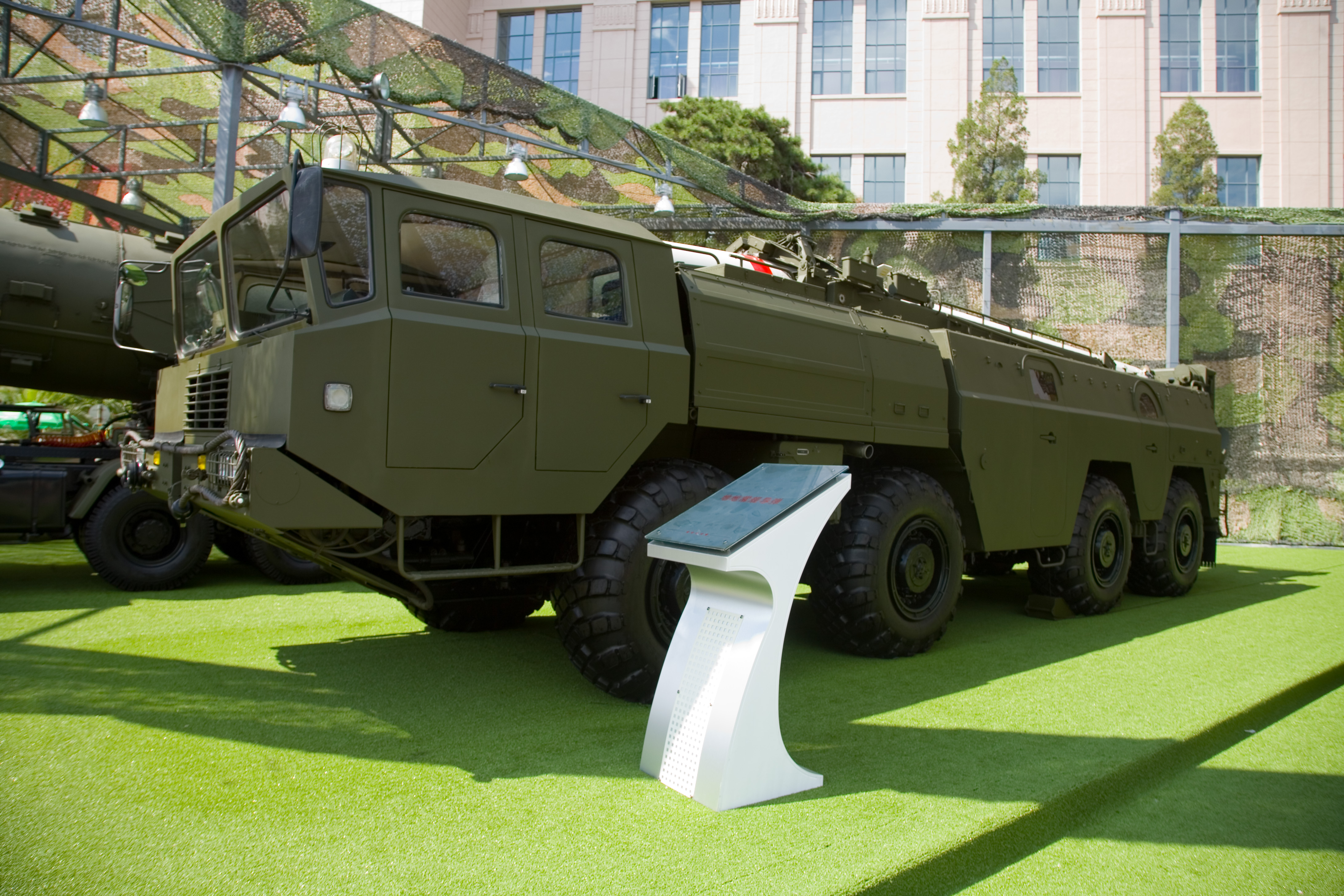
A DF-11 TEL vehicle, based on the WS2400

Wanshan makes various vehicles, including trucks, heavy trailers, and buses. These include:

- WS2180, 6x6 truck with coil suspension, which resembles the MTVR
- WS2180A, with a cab-over-engine layout;
- WS2250, 8x8 truck with engine mounted on the frame behind the cab, which resembles the HEMTT
- WS2300, 6x6 offroad truck, developed from the WS2400
- WS2400, 8x8 offroad truck, developed from the WS580, which was based on the MAZ-543 made by MZKT.
- WS2500, 10x10 offroad truck, developed from the WS2400
- WS2600, 10x8 offroad truck;
- WS5252, used as the basis for the Norinco SH1 self-propelled artillery system.
- WS21050; 14x12 offroad truck;
- WS51200, a very large 8-axle offroad truck with American-designed Chongqing Cummins KTTA19 engine and ZF transmission, similar to the MZKT-79221. Eight were controversially sold to North Korea. The Shaheen-III uses WS51200 transporter erector launcher TEL. The Chinese vehicle design appears based on a Belarusian MAZ missile launcher that was transferred to China in the 1990s and may have been reverse-engineered by the Chinese.
- Bus chassis: WS6600, WS6600AZ, WS6482, WS6483 and WS6320.

== Controversy ==
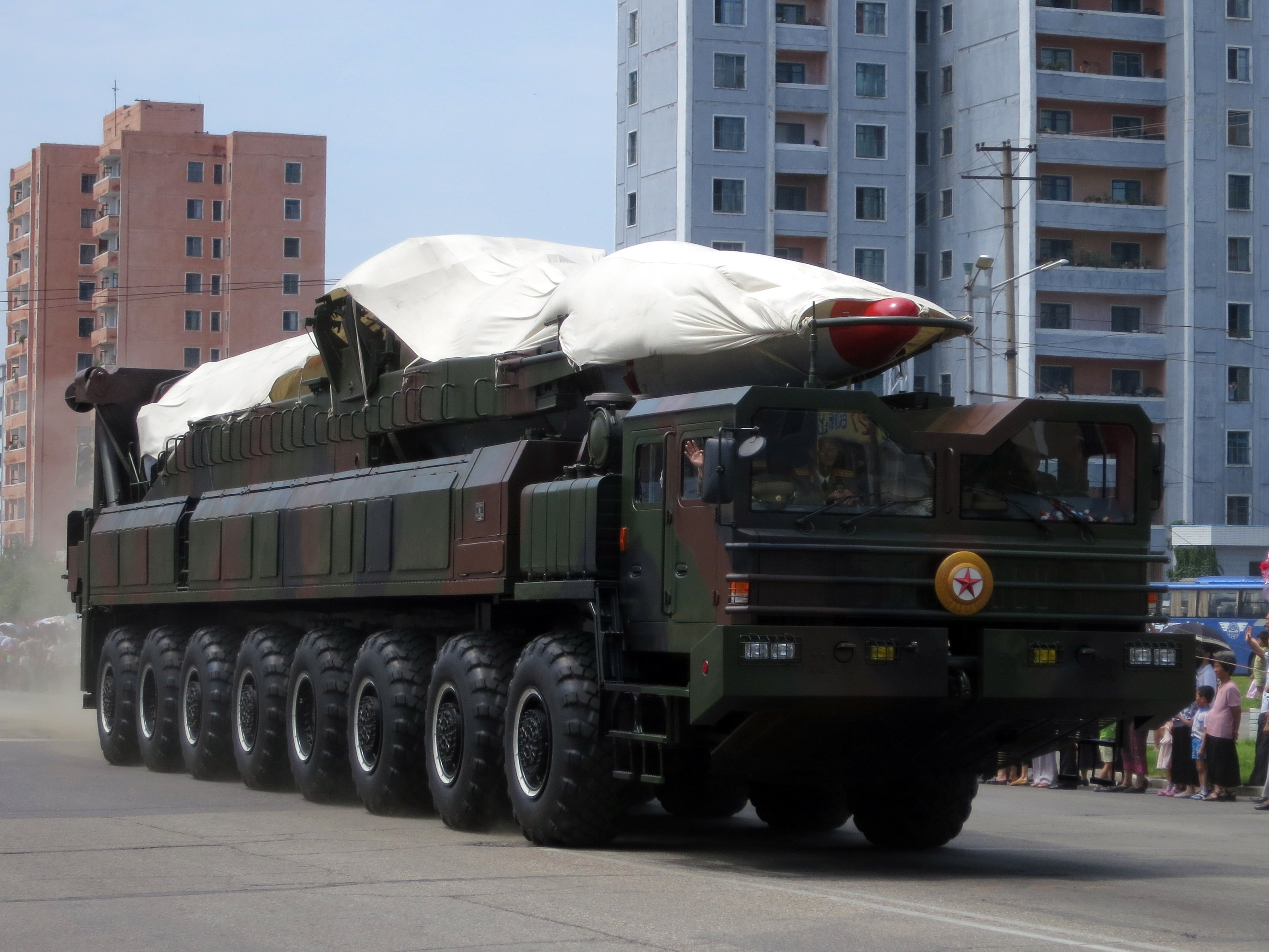
North Korea's ballistic missile; North Korea Victory Day, 2013

Wanshan supplied WS51200 trucks to a North Korean company; the trucks appeared, as transporter-erector-launchers, carrying missiles, at a North Korean military parade. It has been claimed that this sale violated non-proliferation agreements; although China is not a member of MTCR, its own arms-control rules are similar.

The North Korean government is investing in transporter-erector-launchers which are a more difficult target for adversaries, compared to fixed missile launch sites. UN and Asean investigators have concluded that the TELs were Chinese WS51200 trucks legitimately exported to North Korea for lumber transport, with the sales contract specifically prohibiting use of the vehicles for military purposes. The North Koreans illegally converted them into TELs by installing hydraulic gear and controls to erect a missile. Despite being converted to fire a missile, the truck would not be likely to survive damage from the rocket exhaust like a purpose-built TEL, making it a single-use launcher, but North Korea solved this problem by using a temporary launchpad on a base of missile that makes it possible to separate TEL from the missile during launching & there is no more need for TEL during missile separation. Also the satellite image shows the development center of this self-made modification needs.

== See also ==
- Taian Special Vehicle
