= TA580/TAS5380 =

TA580 / TAS5380
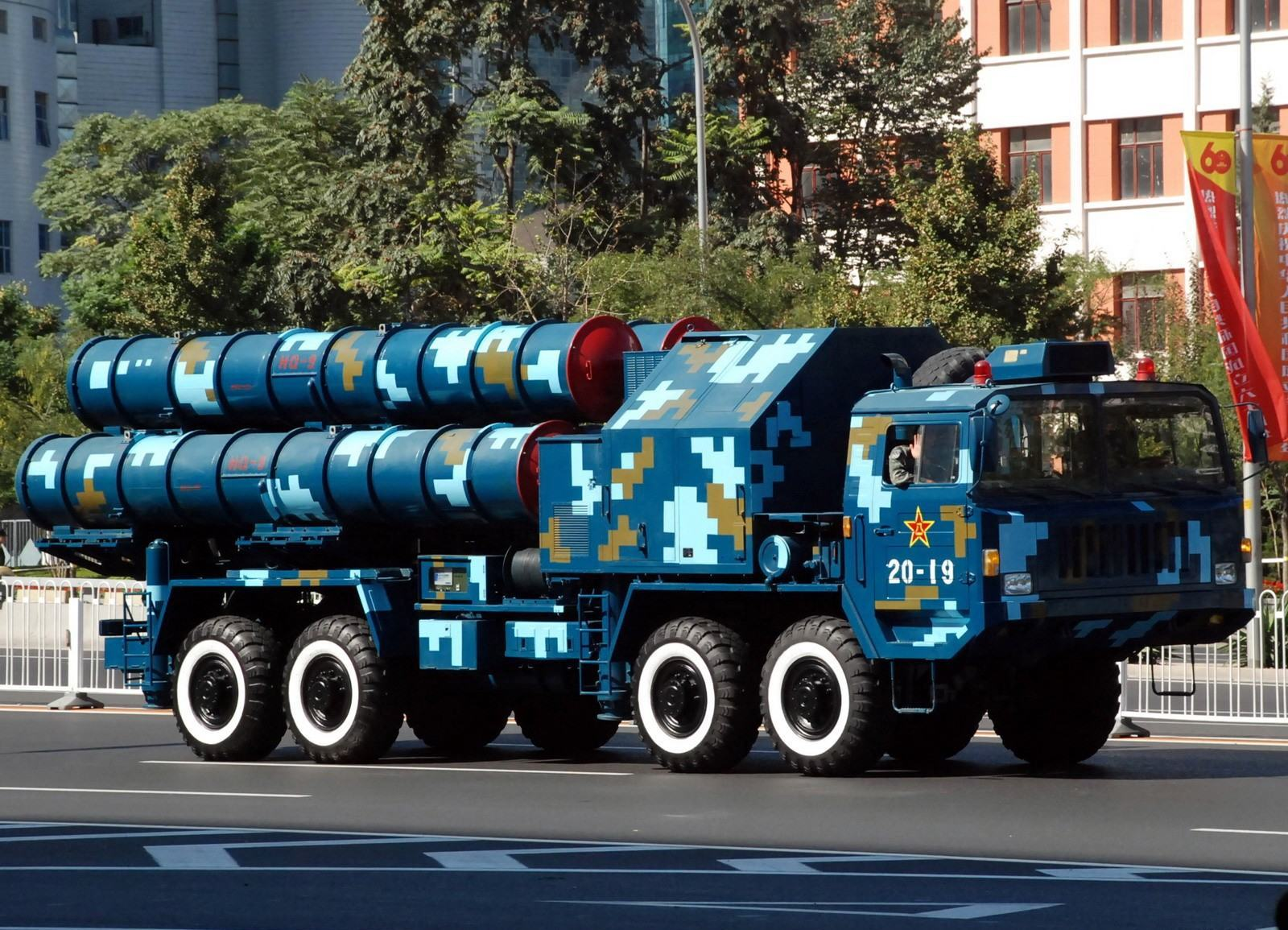
- HQ-9 portable launcher during China's 60th anniversary parade in 2009.
- Type: 8×8 heavy tactical truck
- Place of origin: China

Service history
- Used by: People's Liberation Army Ground Force

Production history
- Designer: Taian Special Vehicle Company
- Manufacturer: Taian Special Vehicle Company

Specifications
- Mass: 18 t (empty)
- Length: 11m
- Width: 3m
- Height: 3m
- Crew: 1+5
- Engine: Deutz turbocharged diesel 517 hp (386 kW)
- Payload capacity: rated at 20 tons
- Operational range: 800 km (497 mi) loaded
- Maximum speed: 80 km/h (50 mph)

The TAIAN TA580/TAS5380 is a 20-ton 8x8 special heavy duty truck developed and built by Taian Special Vehicle Manufactory and used by the People's Liberation Army of the People's Republic of China as a transport/Transporter erector launcher.

== Description ==
The TA580/TAS5380 specializes in carrying ballistic missiles, large-caliber artillery rockets, radar equipment as well as other forms of military assets. Unlike the much larger Wanshan WS51200 and the WS21200, the TA580/TAS5380 cannot carry much larger intermediate-range ballistic missiles and intercontinental ballistic missiles.

Nevertheless, the TA580/TAS5380 has a maximum payload capacity of 20 tons, of which it primarily carries the HQ-9 air defence missile system.

The TA580/TAS5380 comes in two additional variants. The TA5382 accommodates an additional four passengers due to the presence of a double cab, as well as being able to mount the WM-80 and WM-120 artillery rocket system. The TA5501 is essentially a much larger variant with a 10x10 configuration, which offers better stability and mobility.

== Platforms ==
- TAS5380A - 8x8 20 tonnes for the FT-2000 SAM system
- TAS5380SQ - 8x8 30 tonne TEL (WM-80 MRL)

== See also ==
- WS2400
- MAZ-7310
- HEMTT
