= WS2500 =

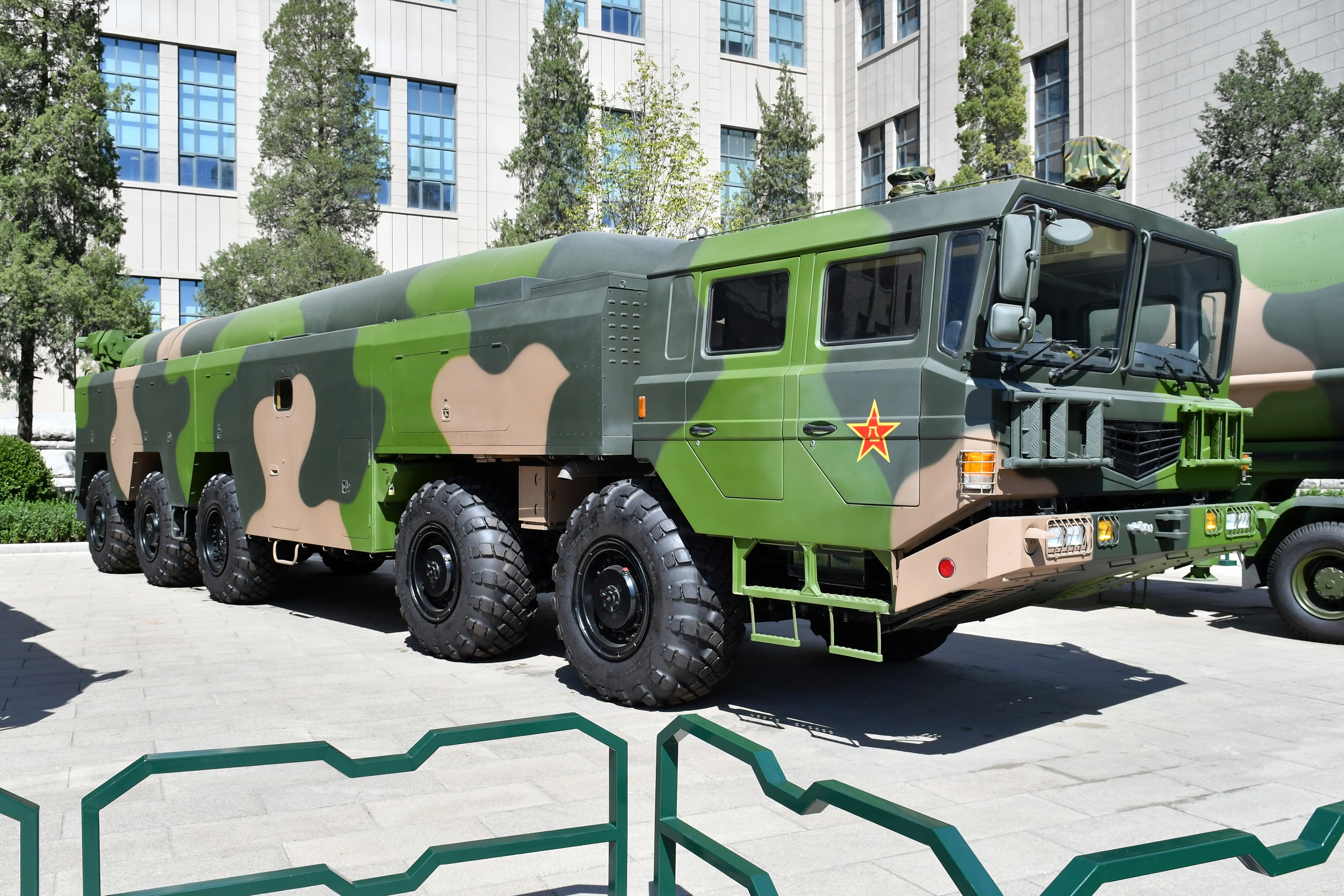
- WS2500 with DF-16
- Type: 10×10 heavy strategic truck/transporter erector launcher
- Place of origin: China

Service history
- Used by: PLA Rocket Force

Production history
- Designer: Wanshan Special Vehicle
- Manufacturer: Wanshan Special Vehicle

Specifications
- Mass: 20 t (empty)
- Length: 15.5 m
- Width: 3.05 m
- Height: 2.97 m
- Crew: 1+7
- Engine: Deutz diesel 517 hp (386 kW)
- Payload capacity: 23-25 tons
- Operational range: 650 km (404 mi) loaded
- Maximum speed: 75 km/h (47 mph)

The WS2500 is a 20-ton 10x10 special heavy-duty truck used by the People's Liberation Army of the People's Republic of China. It is one of the principal mobility platforms in mounting China's medium-range ballistic missiles and other conventional missile assets.

It is a general-purpose heavy-duty truck/transported developed from the original WS2400 and is built by Wanshan Special Vehicle.

== Description ==
As a more developed variant of the WS2400, the WS2500 was introduced in 2000 and is capable of mounting more advance and sophisticated MRBMs such as the DF-16s, rather than the much older DF-11 SRBM system. Due to the much larger missile payload––1,000 to 1,500 kilograms (2,200 to 3,300 lb) more than previous models––the WS2500 is generally much larger and heavier than the older WS2400, in order to better accommodate a stable platform for the DF-16.

On the 70th anniversary of the People's Republic of China, a heavily modified variant of the WS2500 was seen carrying the DF-17 ballistic missile, armed with the DF-ZF Hypersonic Glide Vehicle.

The much larger WS2600 carries the larger DF-21C MRBMs.

== Variants ==
- WS2400
- WS2600
- WS2300

== See also ==
- DF-16
- DF-17
- DF-ZF
