= WS2600 =

Chinese missile launcher

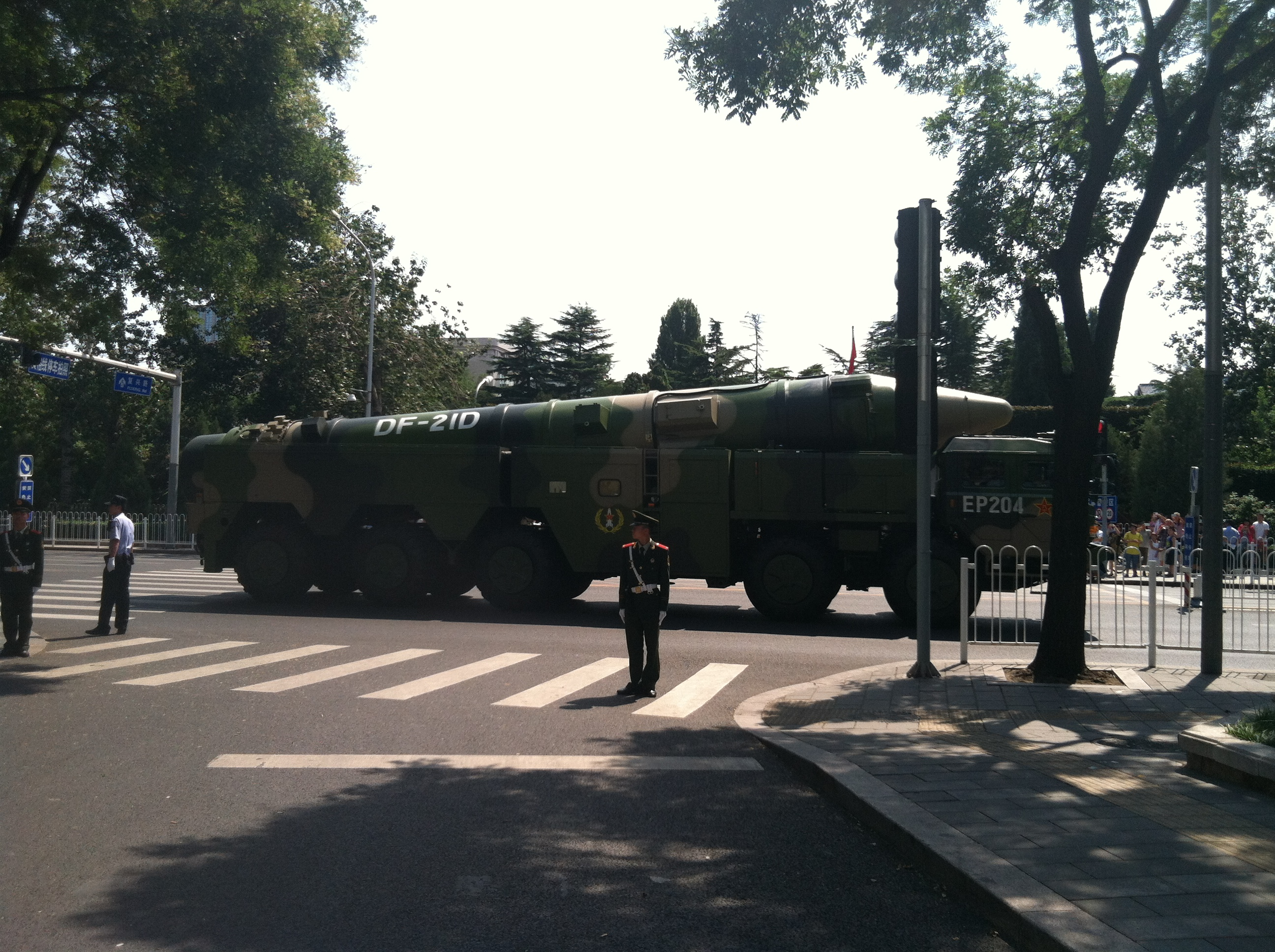
- WS2600 with DF-21D
- Type: 10×10 heavy strategic truck/transporter erector launcher
- Place of origin: China

Service history
- Used by: PLA Rocket Force

Production history
- Designer: Wanshan Special Vehicle
- Manufacturer: Wanshan Special Vehicle

Specifications
- Mass: 22.5 t (empty)
- Length: 16.35 m
- Width: 3.05 m
- Height: 2.82 m
- Crew: 1+7
- Engine: Deutz diesel 544 hp (406 kW)
- Payload capacity: 42.5 tons
- Operational range: 650 km (404 mi) loaded
- Maximum speed: 70 km/h (43 mph)

The WS2600 is a 22.5 ton 10x10 transporter erector launcher (TEL) used by the People's Liberation Army Rocket Force of the People's Republic of China. It is, along with the smaller WS2500, one of the principal mobility platforms in mounting China's medium-range ballistic missiles.

It is a general purpose heavy duty missile transporter developed from the original WS2500 and is built by Wanshan Special Vehicle. Its other contemporary is the larger HTF5680A1.

== Description ==
The WS2600 is a heavy duty TEL co-developed by a joint Chinese and Belarusian venture. The WS2600 is slightly bigger than the WS2500 and a larger version of the original WS2400 with an additional axle to support the increased payload.

Due to its larger size, the WS2600 is able to carry much heftier missiles, of which its most common payload is the DF-21C medium-range ballistic missile and the DF-21D anti-ship ballistic missile. Both the WS2500 and WS2600 form one of the main TEL carriers of China's MRBM and ASBM stockpiles.

Like the WS2500, the TEL has a 4-door cab, which allows the WS2600 to easily accommodates the driver and seven additional passengers.

== See also ==
- WS2300
- WS2400
- WS2500
- HTF5680A1
