= WS2400 =

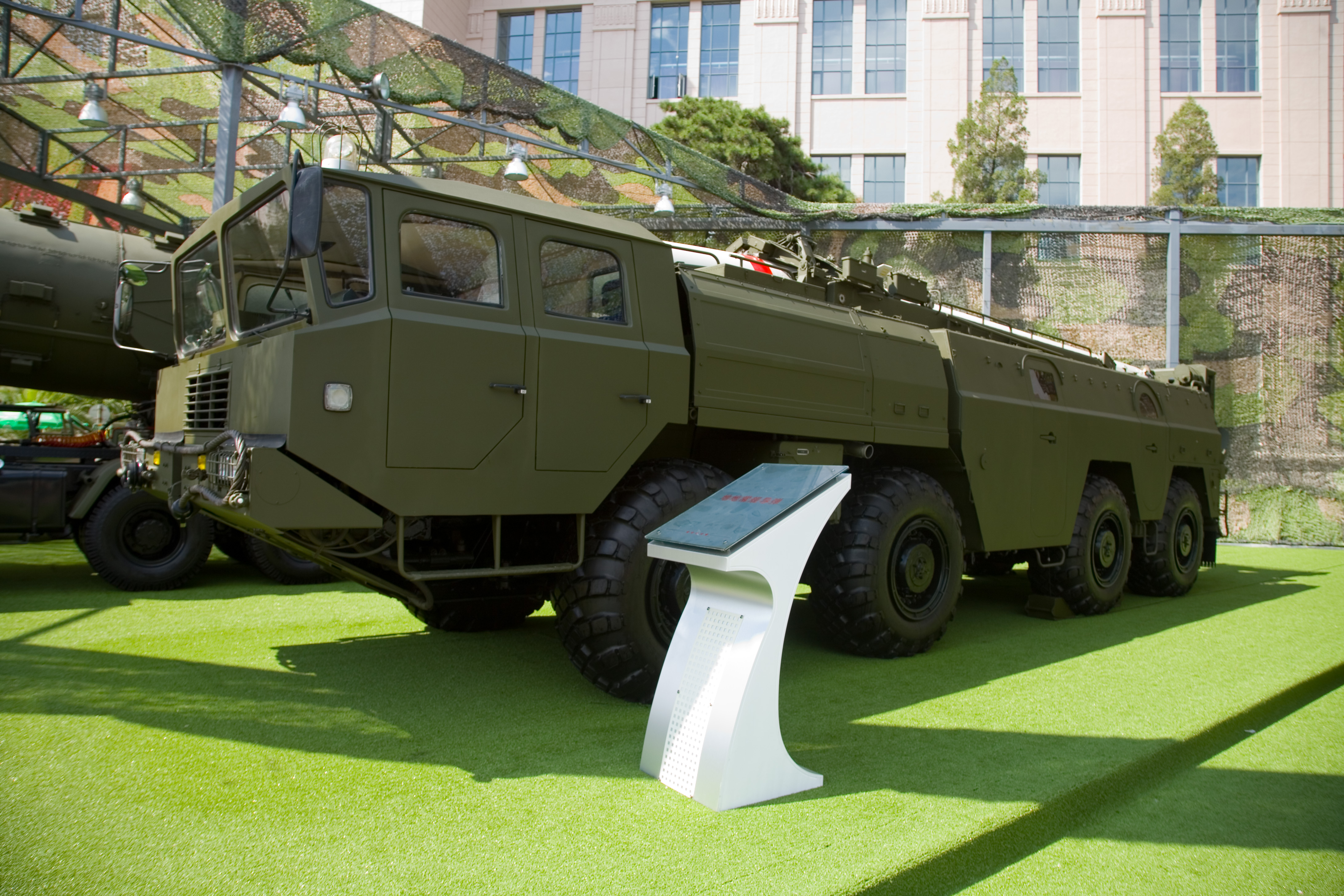
- A DF-11 TEL vehicle, based on the WS2400.
- Type: 8×8 heavy strategic truck/transporter erector launcher
- Place of origin: China

Service history
- Used by: PLA Rocket Force

Production history
- Designer: Wanshan Special Vehicle
- Manufacturer: Wanshan Special Vehicle

Specifications
- Mass: 19 t (empty)
- Length: 11.44 m
- Width: 3.05 m
- Height: 2.97 m
- Crew: 1+7
- Engine: Deutz diesel 517 hp (386 kW)
- Payload capacity: 22 tons
- Operational range: 650 km (404 mi) loaded
- Maximum speed: 75 km/h (47 mph)

The WS2400 is a 8x8 special heavy-duty truck developed and built by Wanshan Special Vehicle and used by the People's Liberation Army of the People's Republic of China as a transporter erector launcher (TEL) platform and is a reverse engineered version of the MAZ-543 missile Transporter erector launcher.

== Description ==
A TEL that is widely used by the PLA due to the sheer numbers of Chinese SRBM assets. The WS2400 is one of the principal mobile workhorse/platforms in mounting and firing China's short-range ballistic missiles.

Wanshan Special Vehicle (湖北三江航天万山特种车辆有限公司) is a wholly owned subsidiary of China Aerospace Sanjiang Space Co. Ltd (中国航天三江集团)], which is in turn a subsidiary of China Aerospace Science and Industry Corporation (CASIC)]. The advantage of the WS2400 compared to the MAZ is that it utilizes a German diesel engine, transmission and hydraulics manufactured by Wanshan in China, built using technologies transferred from ZF Friedrichshafen and Allison Transmission.

The WS2400 has a maximum payload capacity of 22 tons, as such, it is used as the base for a number of conventional and ballistic missile systems the DF-11 SRBM and A-100 MRL platforms.

The much larger WS2500 and WS2600 is a more developed evolution of the WS2400 meant to carry MRBMs and IRBMs.

== Variants ==
- WS2300
- WS2500
- WS2600

== See also ==
- MAZ-7310
- HEMTT
- TA580/TAS5380
- MAN gl
