= Transporter erector launcher =

Self-propelled heavy missile systems

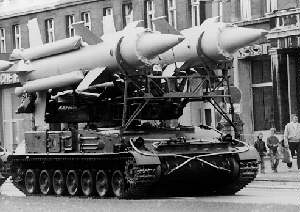
A Soviet 2K11 Krug TEL

A transporter erector launcher (TEL) is a missile vehicle with an integrated tractor unit that can transport, elevate to a firing position and launch one or more missiles.

== History ==
Such vehicles exist for both surface-to-air missiles and surface-to-surface missiles. Early on, such missiles were launched from fixed sites and had to be loaded onto trucks for transport, making them more vulnerable to attack, since once they were spotted by the enemy they could not easily be relocated, and if they were it often took hours or even days to prepare them for launch once they reached their new site.

Usually a number of TELs and TELARs are linked to one command post vehicle (CP or CPV). They may use target information from target acquisition, designation and guidance radar (TADAGR or TAR).

=== Transporter erector launcher and radar (TELAR) ===
A transporter erector launcher and radar (TELAR) is a type of TEL that also incorporates part or all of the radar system necessary for firing the surface-to-air missiles. Such vehicles have the capability of being autonomous, greatly enhancing their effectiveness. With this type of system each vehicle can fight regardless of the state or presence of support vehicles. The vehicle may have to aim the missile, usually through a rotating turret, or they may fire straight up.

=== Transporter launcher and radar (TLAR) ===
A transporter launcher and radar (TLAR) is the same as a TELAR without the erector capability, because the missile in question is transported in the launch-ready position as default. An example is the 9K330 Tor, which mounts a vertical launching system (VLS)-style block of SAMs that correct their trajectory using rockets on the missile body itself.

=== Mobile erector launcher (MEL) ===
The Patriot missile system has a towed launch vehicle or mobile erector launcher (MEL).

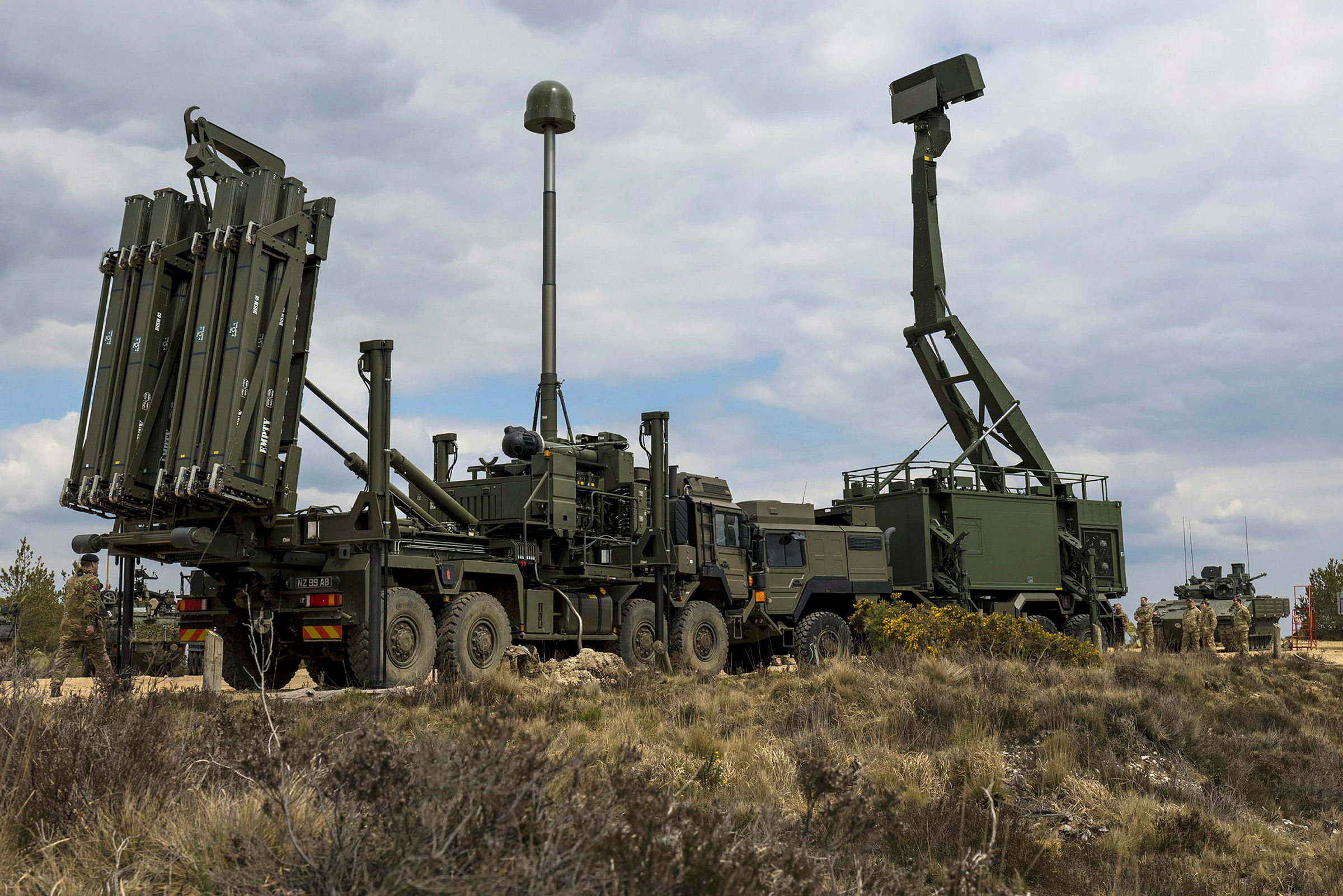
An iLauncher within the Sky Sabre air defence system of the British Army

=== Palletised erector launchers ===
Another sub-set of the TEL are erector-launchers mounted to pallets, which can then be carried by suitable vehicles to create a TEL. The MBDA iLauncher used to launch the Sky Sabre missile is one example; a 15-tonne unit which is carried by MAN HX trucks in British Army service.

== Rocket launch vehicle ==
In spaceflight, TELs are support structures used to transport a rocket launch vehicle horizontally from an assembly facility to a nearby fixed launch pad where it is raised vertical for launch. It is similar to TELs, except the fact that most space rockets must be erected and launched with the appropriate infrastructure, such as those found in a spaceport. This system is used by several space-launch agencies; the Soyuz has a TE that can be transported by railway, SpaceX for its launch vehicles Falcon 9 and Heavy (but not Starship).

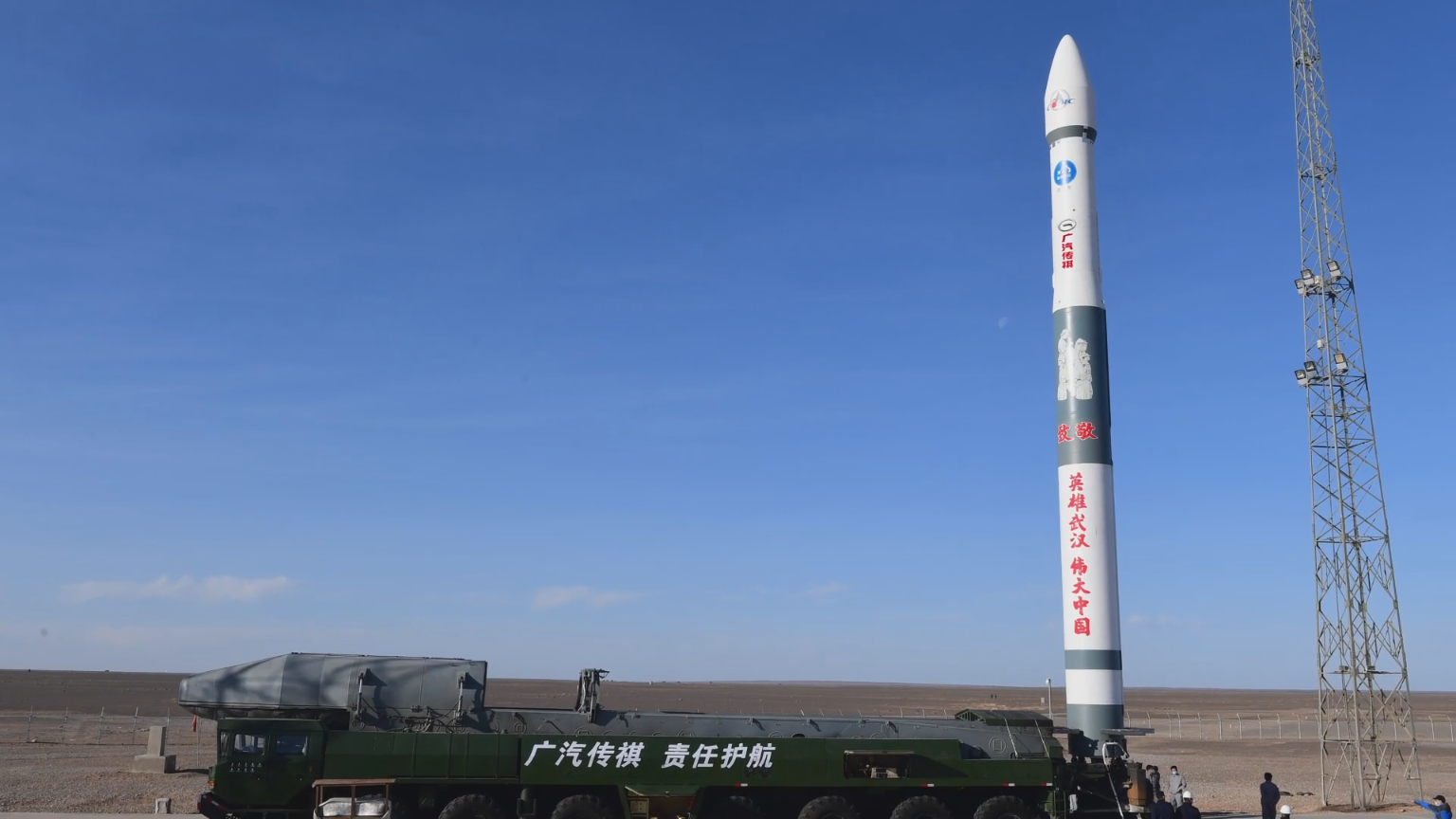
Kuaizhou-1A on the TEL, Jiuquan Satellite Launch Center

Some small-lift launch vehicles, such as Russian Start-1 and Chinese Kuaizhou series, can be launched from ordinary TELs from unprepared pads.

== Types ==
- Taian TA580/TAS5380 8×8 TEL
- Wanshan WS51200 - 16 wheeled TEL
- M270 Multiple Launch Rocket System - tracked
- Pinaka multi barrel rocket launcher
- Kub missile system, Buk missile system - tracked GM chassis, rarely wheel-based
- S-300 missile system, S-400 missile system - 8 wheeled truck-based TEL or MT-T tracked transporter
- S-500 missile system
- RT-2PM Topol, RT-2PM2 Topol-M
- MAZ-547A/MAZ-7916 - 12 wheeled TEL
- MAZ-7917 - 14 wheeled TEL
- MZKT-79221 - 16 wheeled TEL
- MAZ-7907 - 24 wheeled gas turbine TEL
- ASTROS II 6x6 wheeled rocket artillery launcher
- SPYDER

== Gallery ==
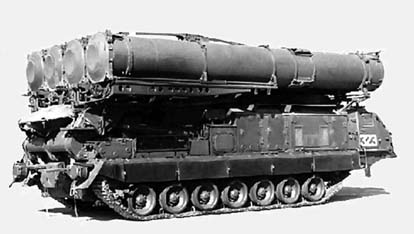
A Russian S-300V TELAR in transit mode

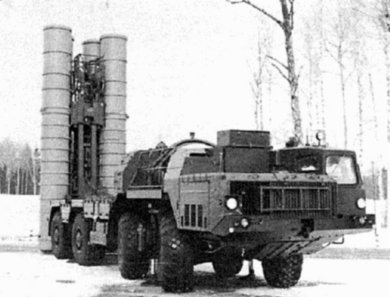
A Russian S-300P TEL ready for launch

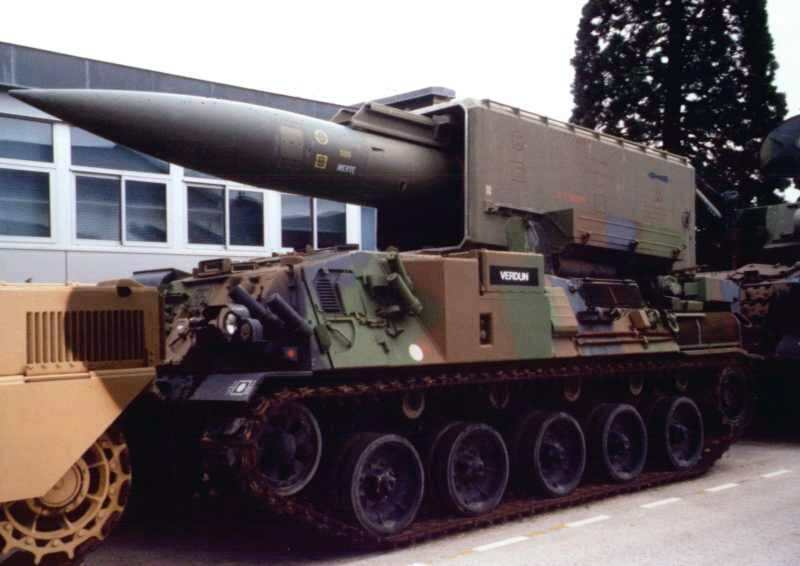
A French Pluton missile in transit mode

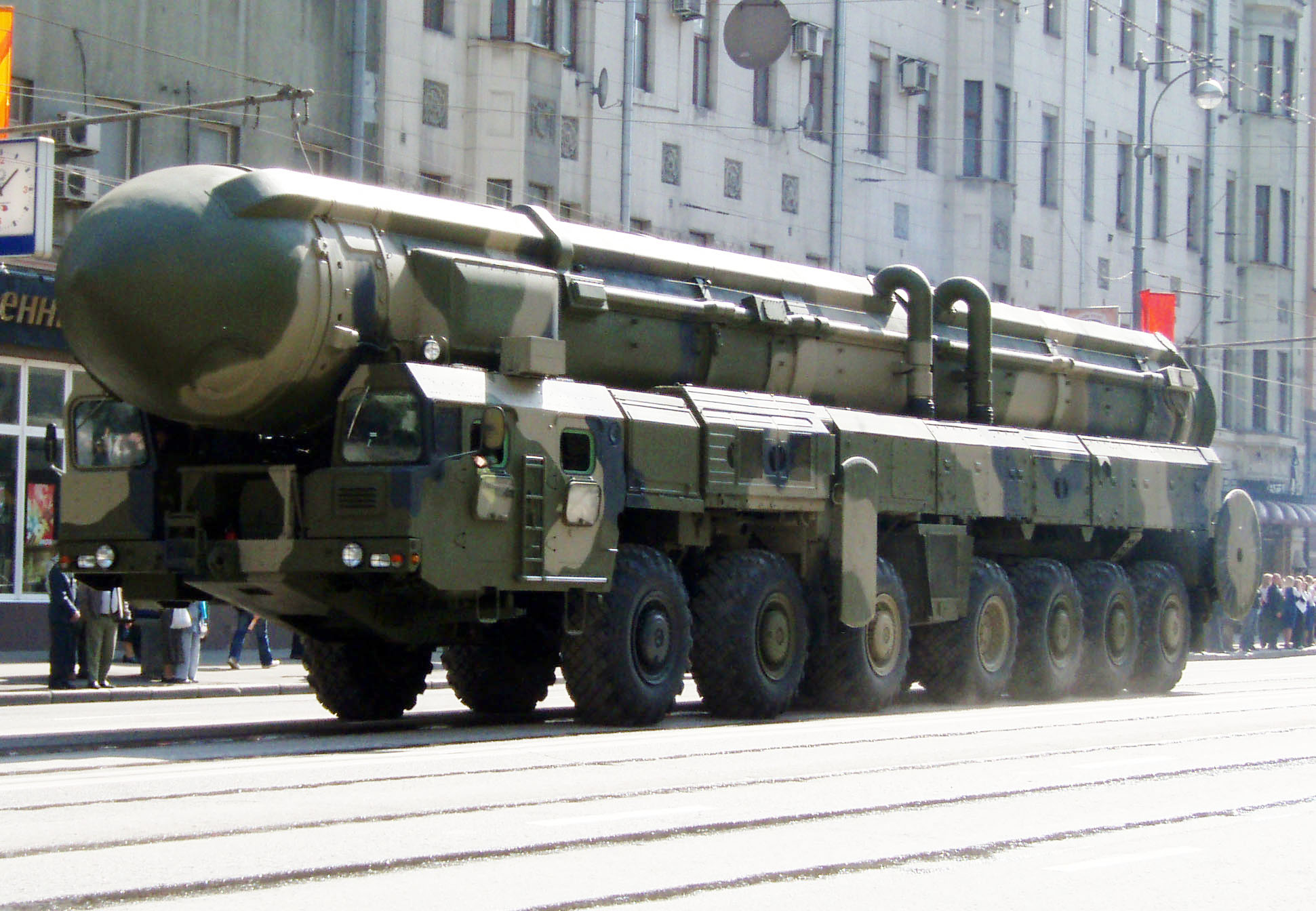
MAZ-7917 TEL

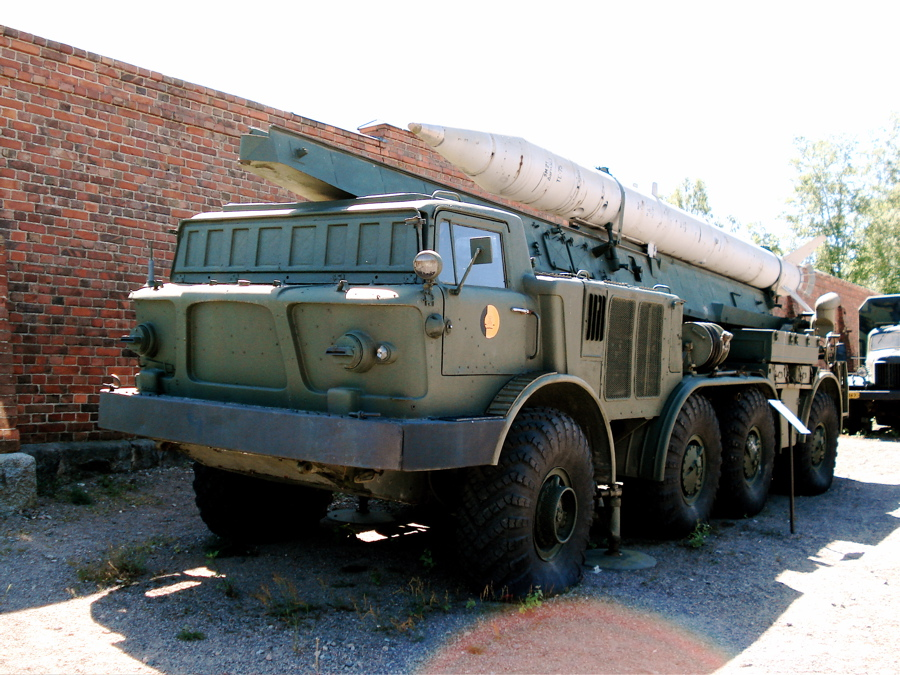
9P113 TEL with 9M21 rocket

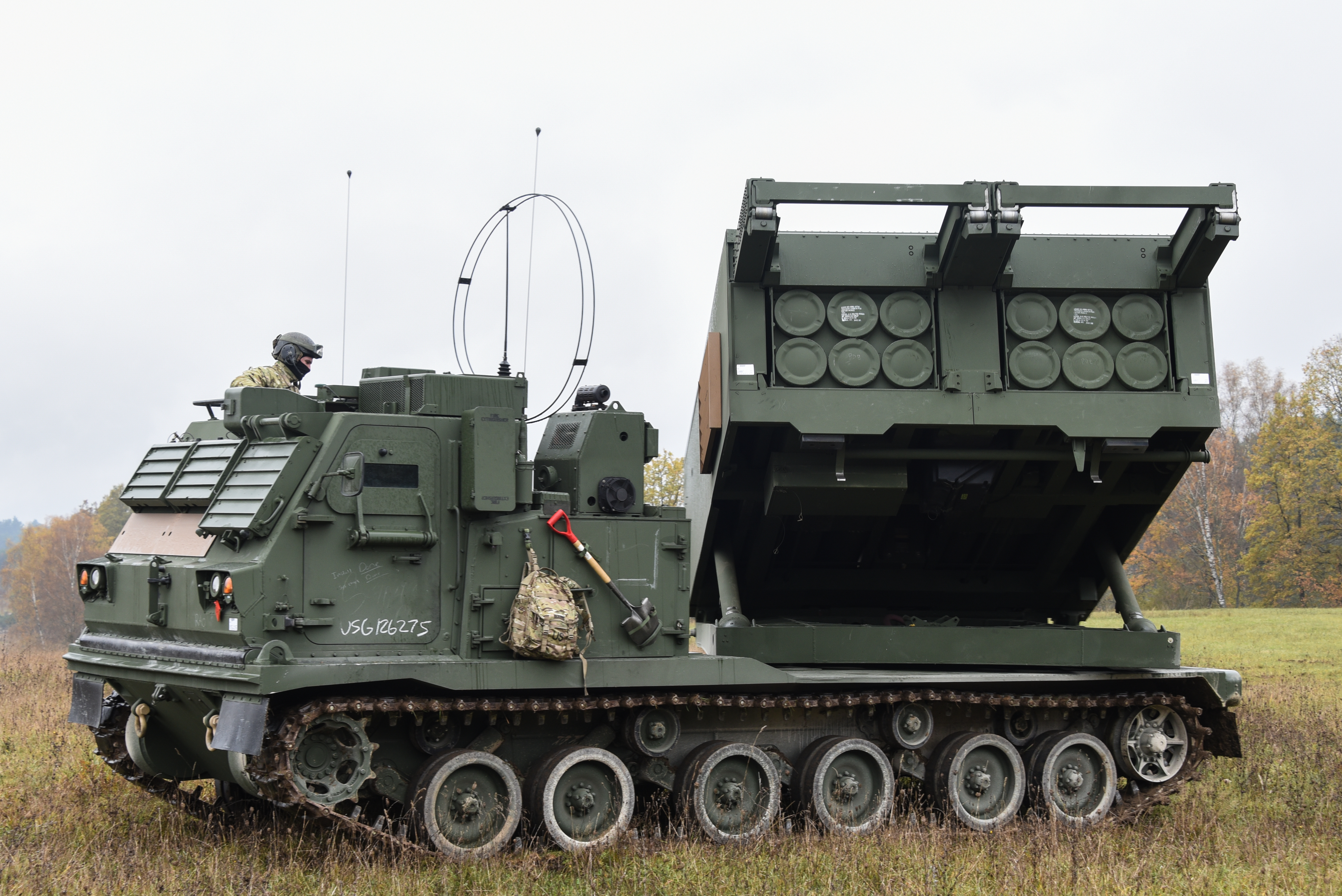
M270 MLRS

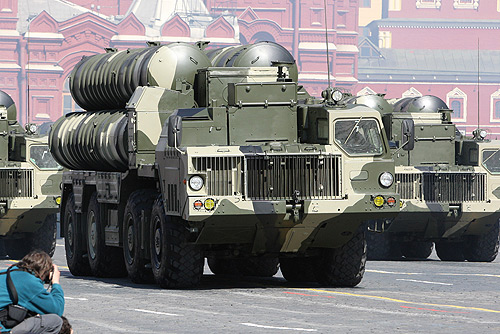
S-300

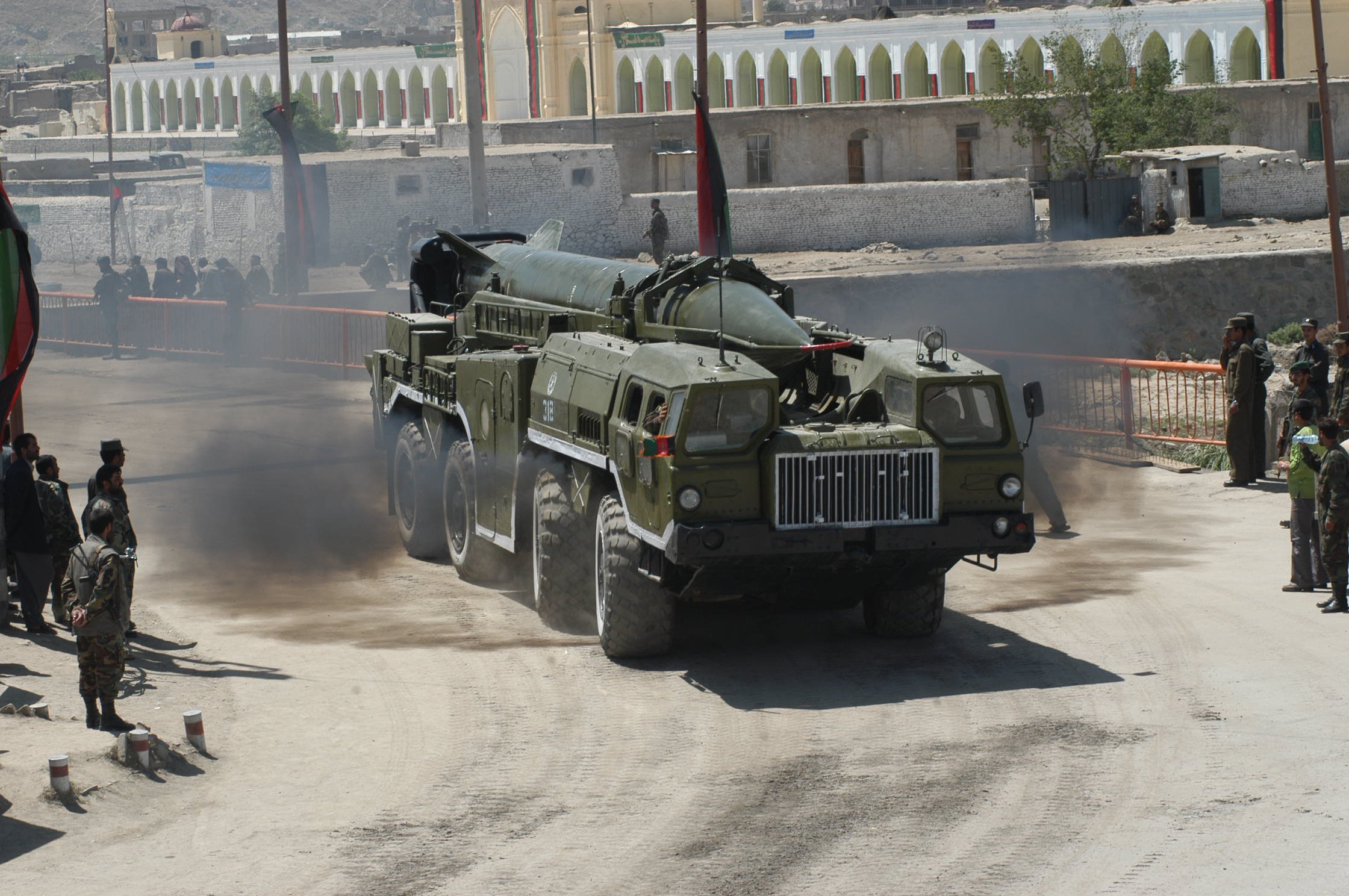
MAZ-7310

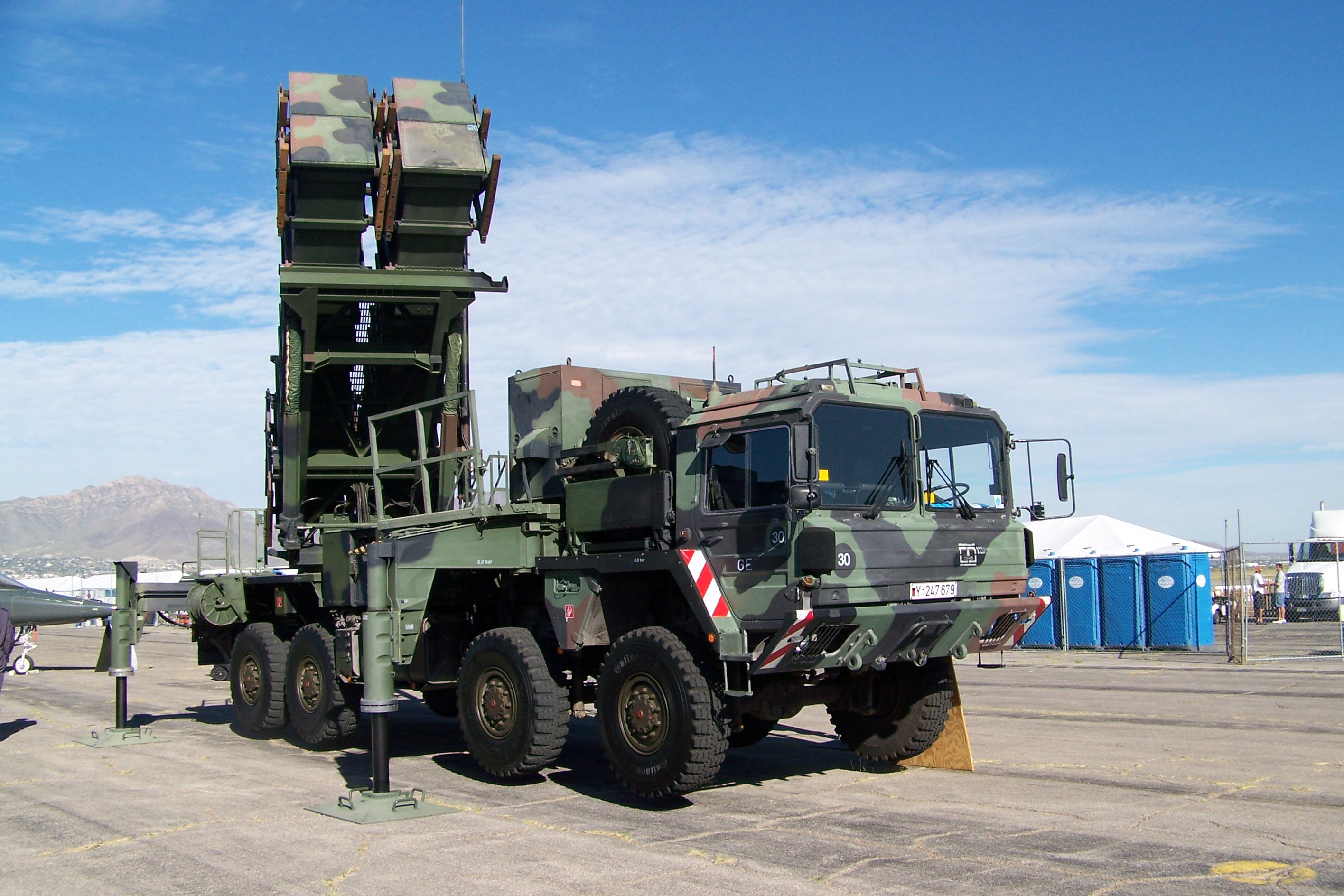
A German PATRIOT launcher

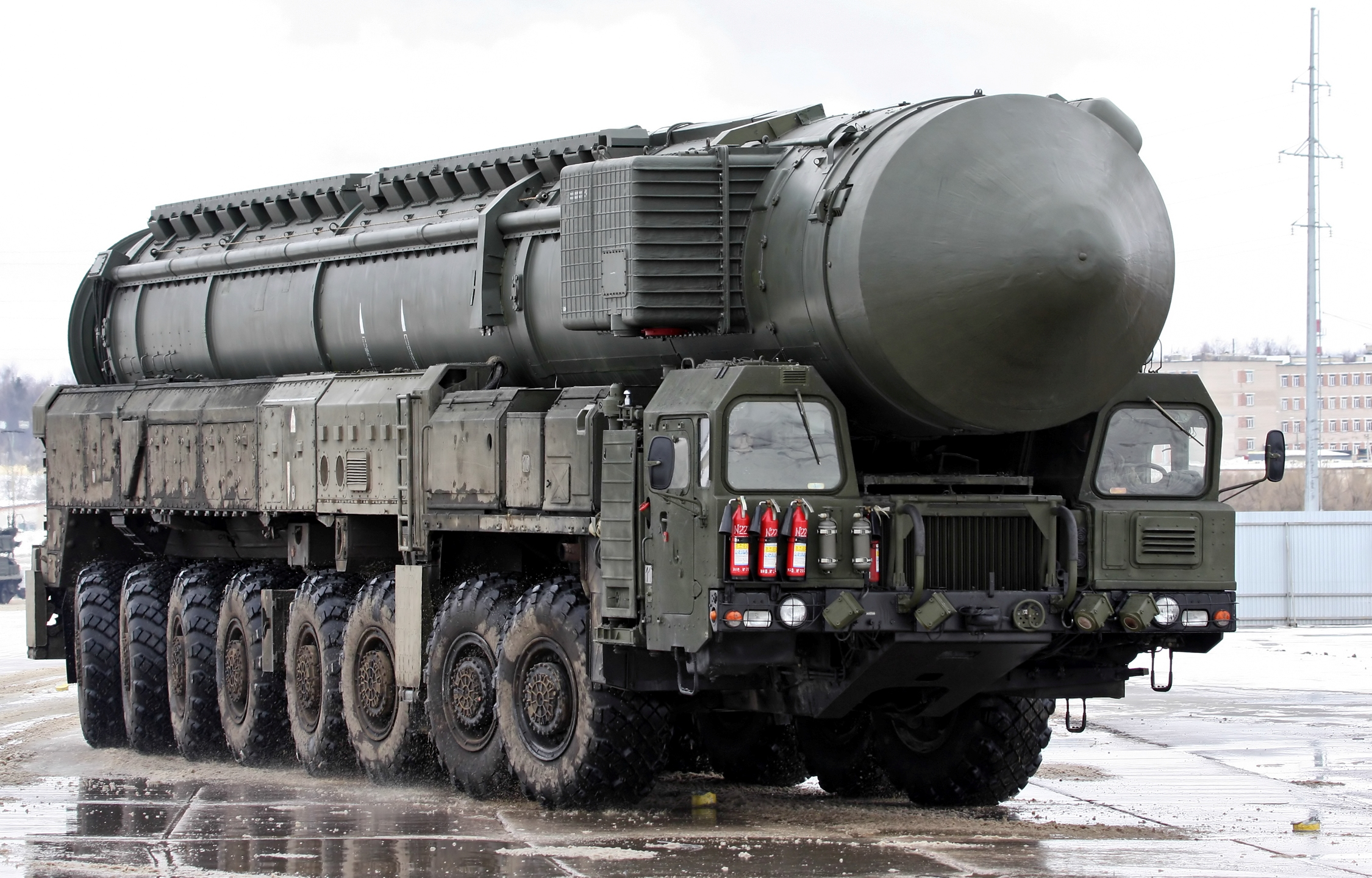
Russian Topol-M MZKT-79221

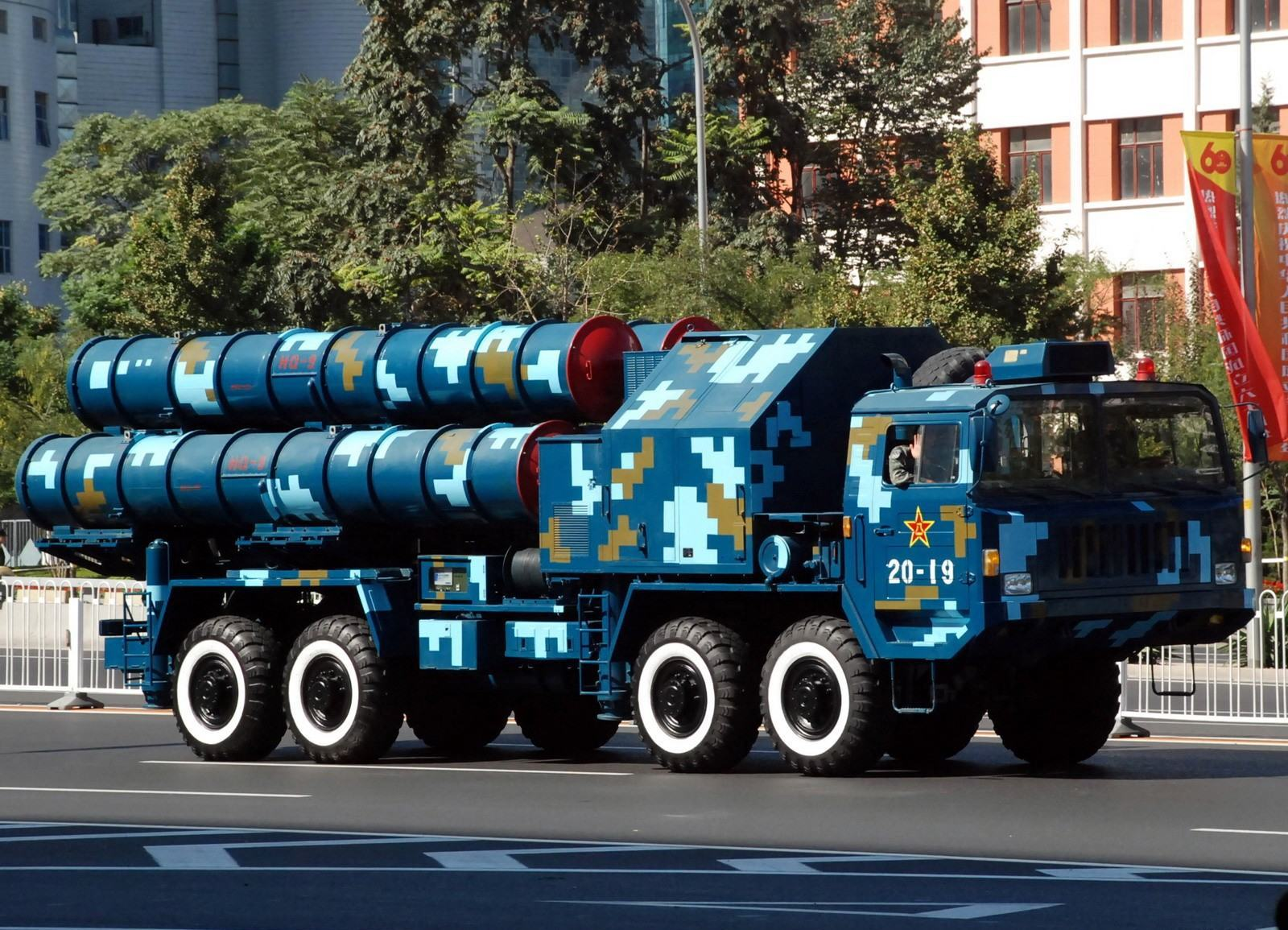
HQ-9 TA580/TAS5380 launcher

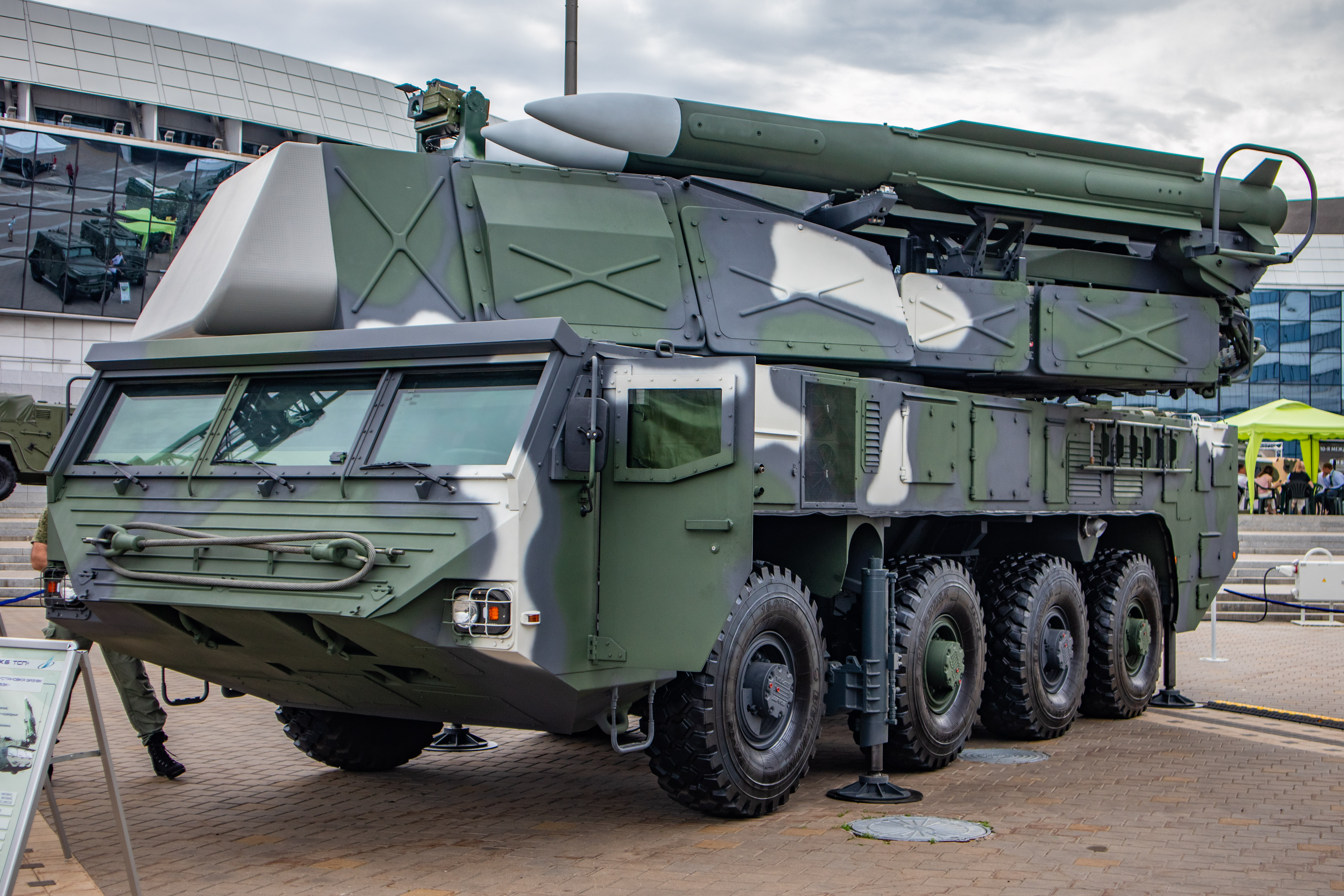
Belarusian Buk-MB3K TELAR on MZKT-69225 chassis

== See also ==
- Meillerwagen, the earliest-designed mobile rocket erection vehicle (trailer) ever deployed
- Missile launch facility
