= NATO Joint Military Symbology =

NATO standard for military map marking symbols

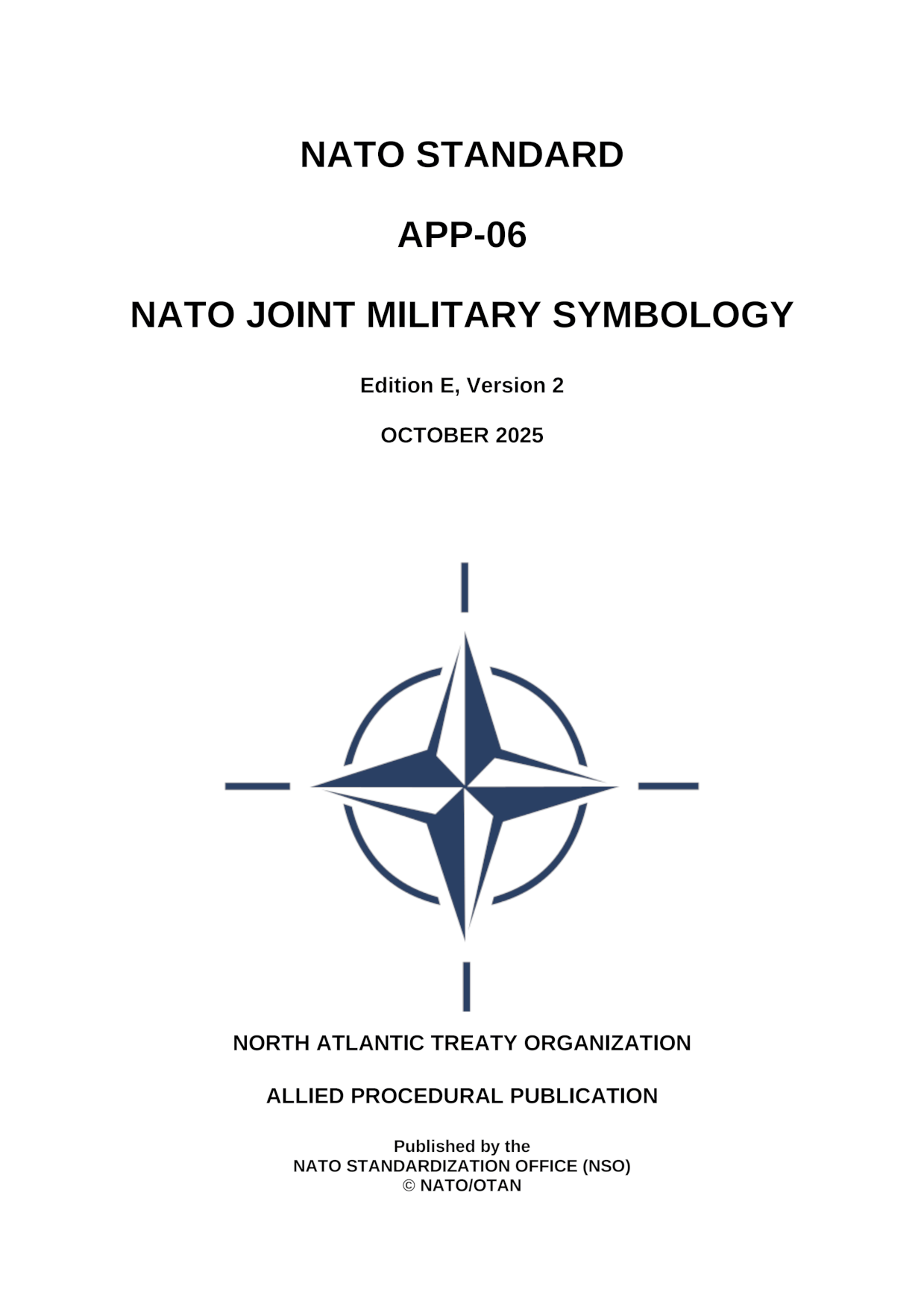
Cover page of NATO standard APP-06 (Edition E, Version 2), in effect since October 16, 2025.

Example symbols
An unidentified hostile motorized anti-tank division
1 DPLeg	Wyszków
Polish 1st Legions Infantry Division of Operational Group Wyszków
3 PPCLI	1 CMBG
3rd Battalion, Princess Patricia's Canadian Light Infantry of 1 Canadian Mechanized Brigade Group
4 Pz	XXIV
4th Panzer Division of XXIV Army Corps
82 Abn
82nd Airborne Division Artillery Brigade

NATO Joint Military Symbology is the NATO standard for military map symbols. Originally published in 1986 as Allied Procedural Publication 6 (APP-6), NATO Military Symbols for Land Based Systems, the standard has evolved over the years and is currently in its fifth version (APP-6E). The symbols are designed to enhance NATO's joint interoperability by providing a standard set of common symbols. APP-6 constituted a single system of joint military symbology for land, air, space and sea-based formations and units, which can be displayed for either automated map display systems or for manual map marking. It covers all of the joint services and can be used by them.

== History ==
The first basic military map symbols began to be used by western armies in the decades following the end of the Napoleonic Wars. During World War I, there was a degree of harmonisation between the British and French systems, including the adoption of the colour red for enemy forces and blue for allies; the British had previously used red for friendly troops because of the traditional red coats of British soldiers. However, the system now in use is broadly based on that devised by the US Army Corps of Engineers in 1917. The infantry symbol of a saltire in a rectangle was said to symbolise the crossed belts of an infantryman, while the single diagonal line for cavalry was said to represent the sabre belt. With the formation of NATO in 1949, the US Army system was standardized and adapted, with different shapes for friendly (blue rectangle), hostile (red diamond) and unknown (yellow quatrefoil) forces.

APP-6A was promulgated in December 1999. The NATO standardization agreement that covers APP-6A is STANAG 2019 (edition 4), promulgated in December 2000. APP-6A replaced APP-6 (last version, July 1986), which had been promulgated in November 1984 (edition 3 of STANAG 2019 covered APP-6), and was replaced in turn by Joint Symbology APP-6(B) (APP-6B) in 2008 (STANAG 2019 edition 5, June 2008) and NATO Joint Military Symbology APP-6(C) (APP-6C) in 2011 (STANAG 2019 edition 6, May 2011).

The U.S. is the current custodian of APP-6A, which is equivalent to MIL-STD-2525A.

== Symbol sets ==
The APP-6A standard provides common operational symbology along with details on their display and plotting to ensure the compatibility, and to the greatest extent possible, the interoperability of NATO land component command, control, communications, computer, and intelligence (C4I) systems, development, operations, and training. APP-6A addresses the efficient transmission of symbology information through the use of a standard methodology for symbol hierarchy, information taxonomy, and symbol identifiers.

APP-6A recognises five broad sets of symbols, each set using its own SIDC (Symbol identification coding) scheme:

- Units, equipment, and installations
- Military operations (tactical graphics)
- METOC (meteorological and oceanographic)
- Signals intelligence
- MOOTW (military operations other than war)

Units, equipment, and installations consist of icons, generally framed, associated with a single point on the map. All sorts of graphical and textual modifiers may surround them, specifying categories, quantities, dates, direction of movement, etc.

Tactical graphics represent operational information that cannot be presented via icon-based symbols alone: unit boundaries, special area designations, and other unique markings related to battlespace geometry and necessary for battlefield planning and management. There are point, line and area symbols in this category.

Meteorological and oceanographic symbology is the only set not under the standard's control: rather, they are imported from the symbology established by the World Meteorological Organization.

The signals intelligence and military operations other than war symbology sets stand apart from Units, Equipment, and Installations although they obey the same conventions (i.e., they consist of framed symbols associated to points on the map). They do not appear in APP-6A proper, having been introduced by MIL-STD-2525B.

== Symbol composition ==
Most of the symbols designate specific points, and consist of a frame (a geometric border), a fill, a constituent icon, and optional symbol modifiers. The latter are optional text fields or graphic indicators that provide additional information.

The frame provides a visual indication of the affiliation, battle dimension, and status of an operational object. The use of shape and colour is redundant, allowing the symbology to be used under less-than-ideal conditions such as a monochrome red display to preserve the operator's night vision. Nearly all symbols are highly stylised and can be drawn by persons almost entirely lacking in artistic skill; this allows one to draw a symbolic representation (a GRAPHREP, Graphical report) using tools as rudimentary as plain paper and pencil.

The frame serves as the base to which other symbol components and modifiers are added. In most cases a frame surrounds an icon. One major exception is equipment, which may be represented by icons alone (in which case the icons are coloured as the frame would be).

The fill is the area within a symbol. If the fill is assigned a colour, it provides an enhanced (redundant) presentation of information about the affiliation of the object. If colour is not used, the fill is transparent. A very few icons have fills of their own, which are not affected by affiliation.

The icons themselves, finally, can be understood as combinations of elementary glyphs that use simple composition rules, in a manner reminiscent of some ideographic writing systems such as Chinese. The standard, however, still attempts to provide an "exhaustive" listing of possible icons instead of laying out a dictionary of component glyphs. This causes operational problems when the need for an unforeseen symbol arises (particularly in MOOTW), a problem exacerbated by the administratively centralised maintenance of the symbology sets.

When rendering symbols with the fill on, APP-6A calls for the frame and icon to be black or white (as appropriate for the display). When rendering symbols with the fill off, APP-6A calls for a monochrome frame and icon (usually black or in accordance with the affiliation colour). NATO symbols can also be rendered with fill off using a frame coloured according to affiliation and a black icon, though this is not defined in any APP-6 standard.

Friendly mechanized infantry with fill on

Friendly mechanized infantry with fill off and monochrome colour frame and icon

Friendly mechanized infantry with fill off and monochrome frame and icon

Friendly mechanized infantry with fill off and bichrome frame and icon

== Allegiance and affiliation ==
=== APP-6 colour representation ===
The concept of affiliation does not appear in the original APP-6 as these were not introduced until APP-6A. Instead, the original APP-6 described a series of "colour representations" with the purpose of distinguishing friendly and enemy elements.

- Multi-colour representation:
  - Blue or black for friendly icons
  - Red for enemy icons
  - Green for man-made obstacles (friendly or enemy)
  - Yellow for chemical, biological, radiological or nuclear events
  - Other colours to be established in a map legend
- Tri-colour representation:
  - Blue or black for friendly icons
  - Red for enemy icons
  - Green or yellow for man-made obstacles (friendly or enemy) and for chemical, biological, radiological or nuclear events
- Two colour representation:
  - Blue, green, or black for friendly icons
  - Red for enemy icons
- One colour representation:
  - Single line border for friendly icons
  - Double line border for enemy icons, and unbordered icons were labeled with "EN" to the lower right corner
APP-6 friendly unit (colour)

APP-6 enemy unit (colour)

APP-6 friendly unit (B&W)

APP-6 enemy unit (B&W)

=== APP-6A affiliation ===
Affiliation refers to the relationship of the tracker to the operational object being represented. The basic affiliation categories are unknown, friend, neutral, and hostile. In the ground unit domain, a yellow quatrefoil frame is used to denote unknown affiliation, a blue rectangle frame to denote friendly affiliation, a green square frame to denote neutral affiliation, and a red diamond frame to denote hostile affiliation. In the other domains (air and space, sea surface and subsurface, etc.), the same color scheme is used.

Style	Friendly	Hostile	Neutral	Unknown
Fill on				
Monochrome (for digital media)				
Monochrome (for print media)				

The full set of affiliations is:

- Pending (P)
- Unknown (U)
- Assumed friend (A)
- Friend (F)
- Neutral (N)
- Suspect (S) (assumed hostile)
- Hostile (H)
- Exercise pending (G)
- Exercise unknown (W)
- Exercise assumed friend (M)
- Exercise friend (D)
- Exercise neutral (L)
- Exercise suspect (J)
- Exercise hostile (K)

There are no "assumed neutral" and "exercise assumed neutral" affiliations.

These colors are used in phrases such as "blue on blue" for friendly fire, blue force tracking, red teaming, and Red Cells.

== Battle dimension ==
Battle dimension defines the primary mission area for the operational object within the battlespace. An object can have a mission area above the Earth's surface (i.e., in the air or outer space), on it, or below it. If the mission area of an object is on the surface, it can be either on land or sea. The subsurface dimension concerns those objects whose mission area is below the sea surface (e.g., submarines and sea mines). Some cases require adjudication; for example, an Army or Marine helicopter unit is a maneuvering unit (i.e., a unit whose ground support assets are included) and is thus represented in the land dimension. Likewise, a landing craft whose primary mission is ferrying personnel or equipment to and from shore is a maritime unit and is represented in the sea surface dimension. A landing craft whose primary mission is to fight on land, on the other hand, is a ground asset and is represented in the land dimension.

Closed frames are used to denote the land and sea surface dimensions, frames open at the bottom denote the air/space dimension, and frames open at the top denote the subsurface dimension.

Dimension	Friendly	Hostile	Neutral	Unknown
Air and space				
Ground				
Sea surface				
Subsurface				

An unknown battle dimension is possible; for example, some electronic warfare signatures (e.g., radar systems) are common to several battle dimensions and would therefore be assigned an "Unknown" battle dimension until further discrimination becomes possible. Special forces may operate in any dimension.

The full set of battle dimensions is, in ascending order of distance from Earth center:

- Special forces (F)
- Sea subsurface (U)
- Sea surface (S)
- Ground (G)
- Air (A)
- Space (P)
- Other (X)
- Unknown (Z)

The mnemonic for this ordering is "Fuss-Gap".

The letter in parentheses is used by the symbol identification coding (SIDC) scheme – strings of 15 characters used to transmit symbols.

The space and air battle dimensions share a single frame shape. In the ground battle dimension, two different frames are used for the friendly (and assumed friendly) affiliations in order to distinguish between units and equipment. The SOF (special operations forces) are assigned their own battle dimension because they typically can operate across several domains (air, ground, sea surface and subsurface) in the course of a single mission; the frames are the same as for the ground (unit) battle dimension. The other battle dimension, finally, seems to be reserved for future use (there are no instances of its use as of 2525B Change 1).

== Status ==
The status of a symbol refers to whether a warfighting object exists at the location identified (i.e., status is "present") or will in the future reside at that location (i.e., status is "planned, anticipated, suspected," or "on order"). Regardless of affiliation, present status is indicated by a solid line and planned status by a dashed line. The frame is solid or dashed, unless the symbol icon is unframed, in which case the icon itself is drawn dashed. Planned status cannot be shown if the symbol is an unframed filled icon.

== Icon placement ==
The icon is the innermost part of a symbol which, when displayed, provides an abstract pictorial or alphanumeric representation of an operational object. The icon portrays the role or mission performed by the object. APP-6A distinguishes between icons that must be framed or unframed and icons where framing is optional. APP-6A defined a standard octagon boundary within each map symbol frame. This octagon is not actually shown when symbols are drawn or rendered but, with a few defined exceptions, all icons inside the frame would also fit inside these octagons. APP-6C modified some symbol frames from previous editions of the standard. From top to bottom, here is the symbol boundary shown inside the APP-6C frames of space elements, air elements, land units, land equipment and surface sea elements, and sub-surface sea elements.

== Unit symbols ==
=== Unit icon modifiers ===
Unit symbols can be used independently as well as in combinations. There are also some symbols that cannot appear by themselves, but can only be used to modify other unit symbols:

Modifier meaning	Friendly	Hostile	Neutral	Unknown	Notes
Airborne					In APP-6 was including air assault and paratrooper forces; since APP-6A is specifically parachute forces
Parachute					Symbol used in APP-6, not used in APP-6A and later editions
Airmobile					Simplified flying wing, evocative of a plane
Airmobile with organic lift					
Amphibious					Squiggle, evocative of water
Motorized					Flat line evocative of a road
Mountain					Triangle, evocative of a summit
Cannon or gun system equipped					
Wheeled and cross-country capable					3 circles, evocative of the sideview of a 6x6 wheeled vehicle

=== Unit basic icons ===
Land unit icons require a frame.

Unit type	Friendly	Hostile	Neutral	Unknown	Notes
Air defence					Evocative of a protective dome
Ammunition					Stylised breech-loaded, rimmed cartridge or shell
Anti-tank					Representing a concentrated, piercing action
Armour					Stylized tank treads
Artillery					A cannonball
Rotary-wing aviation					Blurred, spinning helicopter blades
Fixed wing aviation					Air screw
Bridging/Bridge Laying					Topographical map symbol for a bridge
Combat service support					
Combined manoeuvre arms					Introduced in APP-6C for an organization of infantry and armour; it is a hybrid of the two symbols
Engineer					Letter E on its side. Possibly: Stylised bridge
Electronic ranging					Simplified parabolic antenna
Electronic warfare					
Explosive ordnance disposal					
Fuel, or petroleum, oil, and lubricants (POL)					Simplified funnel
Hospital					Derivative of the medical symbol below superimposed with "H"
HQ unit					This is the HQ unit, not the HQ itself. An HQ's physical position is represented by an empty rectangle with a line extending down from bottom left.
Infantry					Evocative of the crossed bandoliers of Napoleonic infantry, or of crossed swords or rifles
Maintenance					Stylised wrench
Medical					Evocative of the Red Cross symbol
Meteorological					
Missile					Simplified missile
Mortar					Projectile with a vertical arrow symbolizing mortar's high arc trajectory
Military police					
Navy					Anchor
CBRN defence					Simplified crossed retorts, the principal elements in the insignia of the U.S. Army Chemical Corps
Ordnance					Derived from crossed cannon behind a disc
Radar					Stylised lightning flash and parabolic dish
Psychological operations					Electronic schematic symbol for loudspeaker, evocative of propaganda
Reconnaissance or cavalry					Inspired by the cavalry's sabre strap
Signals					Simplified lightning flash, evocative of radio signals (likewise used in the radar symbol above)
Special forces					
Special operations forces					
Supply					Flat line evocative of the side view of a road
Topographical					Stylised sextant
Transportation					Simplified wheel
Unmanned air vehicle					Flying wing silhouette

=== Modified unit icons ===
Some of the most common combinations are:

Modified symbol	Meaning
	Mountain infantry; examples: Italy's Alpini, Germany's Gebirgsjäger, France's Chasseurs Alpins, Poland's Podhale Rifles, US 86th Infantry Brigade Combat Team, Ukraine's 128th Transcarpathian Brigade
	Parachute infantry; examples: 82nd Airborne Division (United States), Fallschirmjäger (Wehrmacht) (Germany), e.g. 26th Fallschirmjäger Regiment, VDV (Russia), PLAAF Airborne Corps (China), Parachute Regiment (UK), Paratroopers Brigade "Almogávares" VI (Spain)
	Airmobile infantry; examples: 101st Airborne Division (Air Assault), Jägerregiment 1, 25th Airborne Brigade (Ukraine)
	Mechanized infantry; examples: US 3rd Infantry Division (equipment example: M2 Bradley infantry fighting vehicle), Ukraine's 93rd Kholodnyi Yar Brigade, Russia's 2nd Guards Motor Rifle Division
	Mechanized infantry equipped with infantry fighting vehicles; equipment examples: M2 Bradley, BMP-3, ZBD-04, Kurganets-25, Dardo IFV
	Amphibious mechanized infantry; example: 1st Marine Regiment (United States) when amphibious assault vehicle units are attached.
	Mechanized infantry (wheeled-"medium"); equipment examples: 3rd Brigade (US 2nd Infantry Division), Stryker, GTK Boxer, ZSL-08, Patria AMV, Mowag Piranha, BTR-80 (with machine gun turrets)
	Mechanized infantry (wheeled-"medium") equipped with wheeled infantry fighting vehicles; equipment examples: BTR-90, Bumerang, ZBL-08, Freccia, VBTP-MR Guarani (with autocannon turrets)
	Tank destroyer; equipment examples: B1 Centauro, AMX 10 RC, ZTL-11, M1128 mobile gun system
	Wheeled armoured reconnaissance; equipment examples: Fennek, VBL, BRDM-2, ASLAV
	Armoured engineers; equipment examples: M60A1 AVLB, Bergepanzer BPz3.
	Combat engineers in mechanized engineer section carriers. Also engineers mounted in IFVs such as Bradley or Warrior.
	Armoured artillery; equipment examples: M109 howitzer, PzH 2000, PLZ-05, 2S19 Msta, 2S35 Koalitsiya-SV, AS90
	Mountain artillery; equipment example: OTO Melara Mod 56
	Multiple rocket launcher; equipment example: M270 MLRS
	Wheeled multiple rocket launcher; equipment examples: HIMARS, Pinaka, BM-27 Uragan, BM-30 Smerch, PHL-03, PHL-16, Astros II MLRS
	Self-propelled anti-aircraft artillery; equipment examples: FlaKPz Gepard, 9K22 Tunguska, Type 95 SPAAA, PGZ-09
	Missile air defence; equipment examples: S-300, S-400, 9K37 Buk, MIM-104 Patriot, Roland
	Attack helicopter; equipment examples: AH-64 Apache, AH-1 Cobra, Eurocopter Tiger, Mil Mi-28, Kamov Ka-50, CAIC Z-10, Agusta A129 Mangusta
	Medium transport helicopter; equipment examples: CH-46 Sea Knight, UH-60 Blackhawk, Mi-17 Hip
	Theatre level fuel supply unit
	Supply and transportation unit

=== Unit size indicators ===
Above the unit symbol, a symbol representing the size of the unit can be displayed:

Symbol	Name	Typical No. of personnel	No. of subordinate units	Typical rank of leader (Commonwealth and US)
	Combatant command; Region (Note: in the US this unit is termed an army region) (very rare in peacetime); Theatre (very rare in peacetime)	250,000–1,000,000+	Several army groups	Commonwealth: Field marshal; US: General of the Army
	Front; Army group (rare in peacetime); Air forces command or major command	120,000–500,000	Several armies or air forces	Commonwealth: Field marshal; US: General of the Army or General officer
	Army (Note: in the US this unit is termed a field army); Air force	100,000	2–4 fighting corps (5–10 fighting divisions) and support troops (often organized in divisions or brigades)	General
	Corps	30,000–90,000	2–4 fighting divisions and support troops (often organized in brigades or groups)	Lieutenant general
	Division	10,000–20,000	Nominally several brigades and/or regiments	Major general
	Brigade; wing (air or aviation)	2,000–10,000	Several battalions or Commonwealth regiments.	Brigadier general; Commonwealth: Brigadier; Commonwealth air: Air commodore; US Army: Colonel
	Regiment; Group (some CS and CSS arms); Group (air or aviation)	500–3,000	3–7 battalions (usually of the same arm)	Colonel; Commonwealth air: Group captain
	Battalion or equivalent; Regiment (certain countries/arms only); Squadron (US Cavalry); Squadron (air or aviation)	300–1,000	2–6 companies, batteries, U.S. troops, or Commonwealth squadrons, etc.	Lieutenant colonel; Commonwealth air: Wing commander
	Company or equivalent; Artillery battery; Squadron (some Commonwealth arms); U.S. Cavalry troop	60–250	2–5 platoons/troops	Commonwealth army: Major; Commonwealth air: Squadron leader; U.S. Captain
	Staffel or echelon (level of hierarchy unique to Germany)	50–90	2 platoons/troops or 6–10 sections	Captain or staff captain
	Platoon or equivalent; Troop (certain countries/arms only); Flight (air and aviation); French Army section	25–40	3–5 squads, sections, or fighting vehicles	Commonwealth: Lieutenant or second lieutenant; US: Second lieutenant
	Section	7–13	2–3 fireteams	Commonwealth: Corporal or sergeant; US: Sergeant or staff sergeant
	Squad	5–10	1–2 fireteams	Commonwealth: Corporal or sergeant; US: Sergeant or staff sergeant
	Fireteam	3–5	n/a	Commonwealth: Lance corporal; US: Corporal or sergeant

The typical commander ranks shown in the table are for illustration. Neither the actual rank designated for a particular unit's commander, nor the rank held by the incumbent commander alters the appropriate symbol. For example, units are periodically commanded by an officer junior to the authorised commander grade, yet a company under the command of a lieutenant (U.S.) or captain (Commonwealth) is still indicated with two vertical ticks. Likewise, some peculiar types of companies and detachments are authorised a major, lieutenant colonel (personnel services companies) or colonel (some types of judge advocate detachments); the company or detachment is nevertheless indicated with, respectively, one vertical tick or three dots.

While in Commonwealth armies, the regiment as a tactical formation does not normally exist, in some cases a regimental sized (i.e. larger than battalion and smaller than brigade) task force may exist where the operational requirement exists. These formations may be commanded by colonels.

Note that, for brigades and higher, the number of Xs corresponds to the number of stars in the United States military's insignia for the typical general officer grade commanding that size unit. For example, a division is capped with XX and is usually commanded by a major general the American insignia for which is two stars.

== Equipment icons ==
Equipment icons are "frame optional".

Equipment symbol (framed)	(unframed)	Equipment type
		Bridge (e.g. AVLB)

== Installation icons ==
Installation symbol	Installation type
	Bridge production

== Symbol modifiers ==
APP-6A stops with field AB. MIL-STD-2525B and 2525B Change 1 add a number of other modifiers.

Positions of the various graphic modifiers around the symbol (itself field A). MIL-STD-2525B Change 1 fails to specify where to place fields AD, AE, and AF.

=== Graphic modifiers ===
- Echelon (field B) Identifies command level (see Unit sizes, above).
- Task force (field D) Identifies a unit as a task force. It may be used alone or in combination with echelon, like so:

Type	Icon
Combat team or Company group	
Battlegroup	
Regimental combat team or Marine expeditionary unit (MEU)	
Brigade group or Brigade combat team or Marine expeditionary brigade (MEB)	
Marine Expeditionary Force (MEF)	

- Frame shape modifier (field E) A short textual modifier that completes the affiliation, battle dimension, or exercise description of an object ("U", "?", "X", "XU", "X?", "J" or "K"). It is treated as a graphic modifier, however.
- Direction of movement (field Q) A fixed-length arrow that identifies the direction of movement or intended movement of an object. It emanates from the symbol's centre except in the ground domain, where it is hooked to a short offset, straight down from the symbol's base centre (see diagram).
- Mobility indicator (field R) Depicts the mobility of an object. It is used only with equipment.
- Headquarters staff or offset location (field S) Identifies a unit as a headquarters, or indicates the object's actual location on the map when it has been shifted away in order to declutter the display. It goes straight down from the symbol's centre left, then angles towards the actual location (see diagram).
- Feint/dummy (field AB) Identifies a unit intended to draw the enemy's attention away from the area of the main attack, or a decoy designed to fool enemy intelligence. It consists of a dashed chevron, placed above the frame, like the echelon graphic modifier (the standard is unclear as to how the two combine graphically).
- Installation (field AC) Identifies a particular symbol as an installation. It sits atop the frame.
- Auxiliary equipment (field AG) Indicates the presence of a towed sonar array (used exclusively in the sea surface or subsurface battle dimensions). It sits below the frame, like field R.
- Area of uncertainty (field AH) Indicates the area where an object is most likely to be, based on the object's last report and the reporting accuracy of the sensor that detected it. This can take various forms, such as an ellipse, a bounding box, or lines indicating probable bearing and distance.
- Dead reckoning trailer (field AI) Identifies where an object should be located at present, given its last reported course and speed. This can take the form of a dotted line (extending from the symbol to the dead-reckoned position) or a dotted circle (bounding the zone the object may have reached since, when the direction of movement is unknown or uncertain).
- Speed leader (field AJ) Depicts the speed and direction of movement of an object. It is identical to the direction of movement indicator except that its length is variable (and there is no arrow head).
- Pairing line (field AK) Connects two objects.

==== Feints/dummies and installations ====
Feint/dummy	Installations

==== Mobility and auxiliary equipment ====
Wheeled (limited cross-country)	Wheeled cross-country	Tracked	Half-tracked	Towed	Railway
Snowmobile	Sled	Pack animals	Barge	Amphibious	
		Short towed array (typ. sonar)		Long towed array (typ. sonar)	

=== Text modifiers ===
- Quantity (field C) Identifies the number of equipment items present.
- Reinforced or reduced (field F) Displays (+) for reinforced, (-) for reduced, (±) for reinforced and reduced.
- Staff comments (field G)
- Additional information (field H)
- Evaluation rating (field J) A letter-and-number reliability and credibility rating, assigned by intelligence.
- Combat effectiveness (field K)
- Signature equipment (field L) Used for hostile equipment; "!" indicates a detectable electronic signature.
- Higher formation (field M) Number or title of higher echelon command.
  - field M of this company symbol shows that it belongs to the 42nd Armored Infantry Battalion:
- Hostile (enemy) (field N) "ENY" denotes hostile equipment.
- IFF/SIF (field P) IFF/SIF Identification modes and codes.
- SIGINT mobility indicator (field R2) "M" for Mobile, "S" for Static, "U" for Uncertain.
- Unique designation (field T)
  - field T shows this is Alpha Company:
- Type (field V)
- Date/time group (DTG) (field W) Indicates the symbol's date and time stamp.
- Altitude/height/depth (field X)
- Location (field Y) Location in degrees, minutes, and seconds (or in UTM or other applicable display format).
- Speed (field Z) Velocity as set forth in MIL-STD-6040.
- Special C2 headquarters (field AA)
- Platform type (field AD) "ELNOT" (electronic intelligence notation) or "CENOT" (communications intelligence notation)
- Equipment teardown time (field AE) In minutes.
- Common identifier (field AF) Example: "Hawk" for a Hawk SAM system.

== Other information ==
APP-6 organization chart of the 1st Marine Expeditionary Force (MEF):

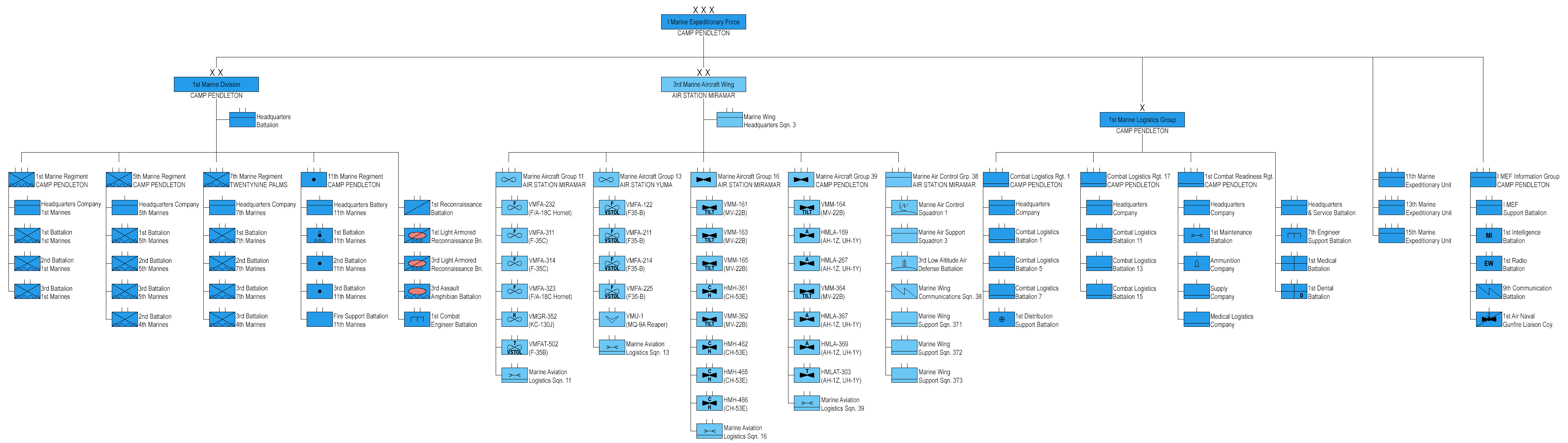
Structure of the 1st MEF (click to enlarge)

A quick reference chart for friendly icons:

Quick guide to military symbology

== MIL-STD-2525A ==
APP-6A, Military Symbols for Land Based Systems was developed directly from MIL-STD-2525A, Common Warfighting Symbology. MIL-STD 2525A was the American standard for military symbols. The custodian of APP-6 is the United States. APP-6(A) remained unchanged as work on harmonizing it with ADatP-3, NATO Message Text Formatting System was carried out. In 1999, APP-6 was moved from the Army Service Board to the Joint Service Board. With this move, APP-6 was placed under the Information Exchange Requirements Harmonization/Message Text Format Working Group. The IERH/MTFWG then formed the Joint Symbology Panel to provide configuration management of APP-6 with the US custodian as the chairman. With the ratification and promulgation of APP-6(B) in 2008, the named was changed to NATO Military Symbology to better reflect the nature of the publication. In 2011, with the introduction of APP-6(C), the named was changed to NATO Joint Military Symbology. The US military required new symbols to support ongoing operations in Iraq and Afghanistan, so the pace of change between APP-6 and MIL-STD-2525 remained uneven until 2009. In 2009, a new chairman for DOD Symbology Standardization Management Committee was appointed, and the two configuration management organizations began to work together. The two organizations held joint meetings with full participation on both sides. The goal of both groups is to develop comprehensive joint military symbology that is common to both organizations to the greatest extent possible. APP-6(C) began the process of changing the format of the publications and introduced new symbol identification codes. MIL-STD-2525D has carried that one step further with more symbols and more symbol sets derived from recent NATO and US operations. MIL-STD-2525D will serve as the base document for APP-6(D) as the two documents move closer together.
