= PHL-03 =

Chinese multiple rocket launcher

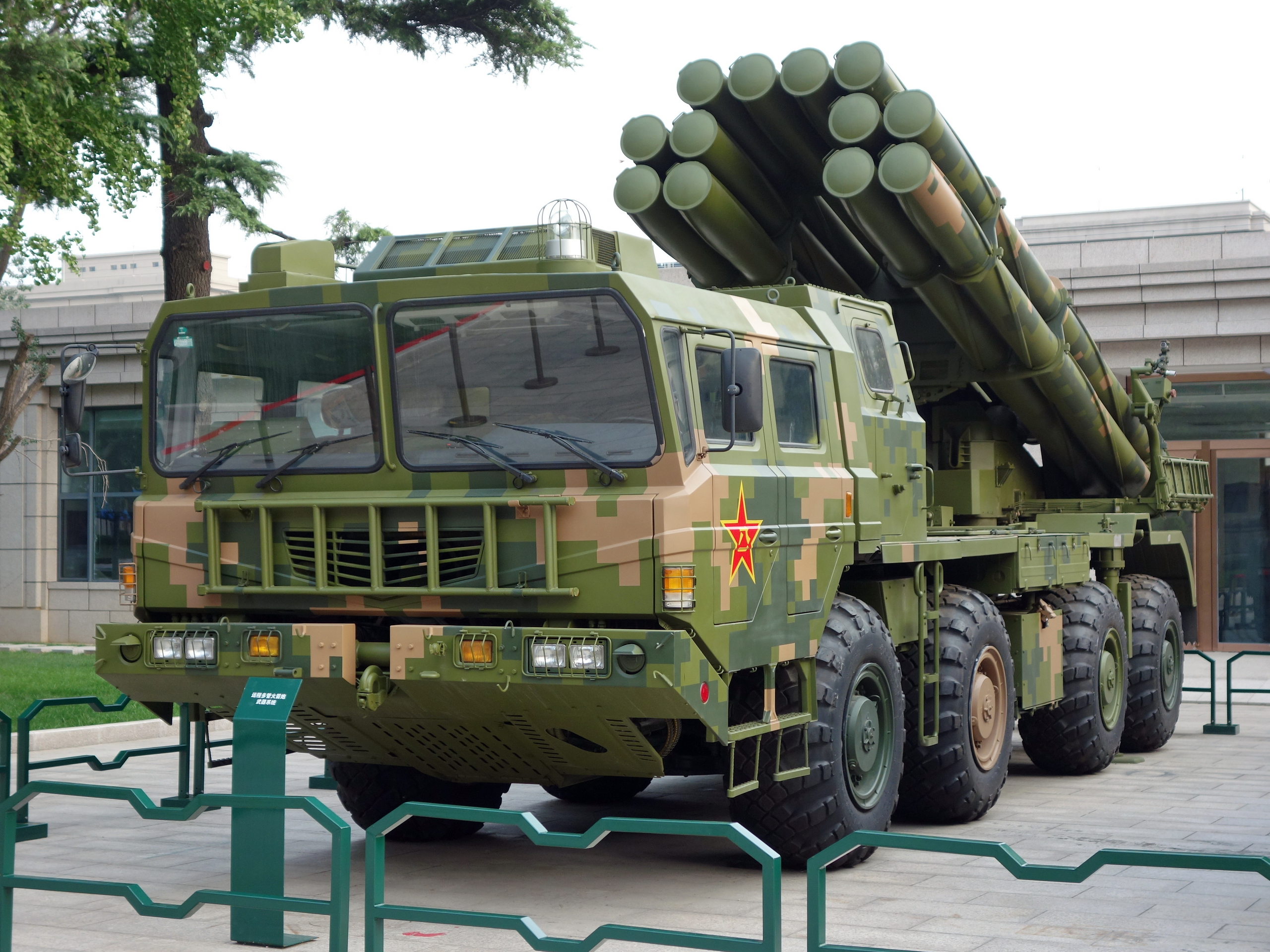
- PHL-03 on display at Beijing's Military Museum of the Chinese People's Revolution, 2017
- Type: Multiple rocket launcher
- Place of origin: China

Service history
- In service: 2004–present
- Used by: People's Liberation Army Ground Force; Ethiopian Ground Forces; Royal Moroccan Armed Forces; Tanzania People's Defence Force
- Wars: Tigray War

Production history
- Manufacturer: China Ordnance Industries Group Corporation Limited

Specifications
- Mass: 43 t
- Length: 12 m (39 ft 4 in)
- Width: 3 m (10 ft)
- Height: 3 m (10 ft)
- Crew: 4
- Caliber: 300 mm (12 in)
- Barrels: 12
- Maximum firing range: 70–130 km (43–81 mi)
- Engine: Diesel engine 500 hp (370 kW)
- Suspension: 8×8 wheeled
- Operational range: 650 km (400 mi)
- Maximum speed: 60 km/h (37 mph)

The PHL-03 is a truck-mounted self-propelled 12-tube 300 mm long-range multiple rocket launcher of the People's Republic of China.

The system is beginning to be replaced by the more modular and newer PHL-16.

== History and development ==
In the 1980s, the People's Liberation Army Ground Force planned to procure long-range multiple rocket launchers and explored options from several Chinese military corporations. Four companies bid in the competition:

- AR-1 rocket system developed by Changchun subsidiary of the China North Industries Group Corporation (Norinco).
- A-100 rocket system developed by China Academy of Launch Vehicle Technology (CALT), a subsidiary of the China Aerospace Science and Technology Corporation (CASC).
- WS-1 (Weishi rockets) rocket system developed by Sichuan 7th Academy, a subsidiary of the China Aerospace Science and Technology Corporation (CASC).
- WM-80 rocket system developed by the Qiqihar subsidiary of the China North Industries Group Corporation (Norinco).

In the end, the AR-1 multiple rocket launcher system was chosen by the People's Liberation Army Ground Force, which received designation PHL-03. After the competition, these companies started to export their products. China Aerospace Science and Industry Corporation (CASIC) did not participate in the bidding process due to time constraints, but CASIC revealed its first MLRS design, SY-400, in the Zhuhai Airshow 2008.

AR-1 (PHL-03) was considered to be the most conservative option in the competition, as the system was a derivative of the BM-30 Smerch multiple launch rocket system, with reverse-engineered technology, though PHL-03 was not a pure copy of BM-30, as both systems were not compatible in ammunition and fire controls. The reverse-engineer made the AR-1 the most mature option out of the competition, ensuring fast-tracked delivery to the PLA. To improve the capability of the PHL-03, Norinco Changchun also developed Fire Dragon guided rocket series.

== Design ==
The design is based on the Soviet-made BM-30 Smerch rocket artillery system. The main role of this multiple rocket launcher is to engage strategic targets such as large concentrations of troops, airfields, command centres, air defense batteries, and support facilities. It is also used to engage in counter-battery fire missions.

The PHL-03 has the same configuration as the original Soviet counterpart with 12 launch tubes for 300 mm artillery rockets, along with a computerised fire-control system (FCS) incorporating GPS/GLONASS/BeiDou.

=== Rockets ===
The PHL-03 uses the 300 mm (12 in) rockets of the BRE family, namely the BRC4, BRE2, and the guided Fire Dragon 140A, which have a range of 130 km (81 mi).

A standard weight for each rocket is 800 kg (1,800 lb) with a 280 kg (620 lb) warhead. Maximum firing range depends on warhead type, with around 70–130 km (43–81 mi). Standard warheads are high-explosive fragmentation (HE-FRAG), fuel-air explosive, and cluster warheads with anti-armor and anti-personnel submunitions. Cluster warheads can also carry self-targeting anti-tank munitions. A full salvo of this system could potentially cover an area of up to 67 hectares (170 acres). In October 2020, it was reported that a new type of rocket was being deployed on the PHL-03 with a range 30 km (19 mi) longer than normal, suggesting a range of 160 km (99 mi).

== Variants ==
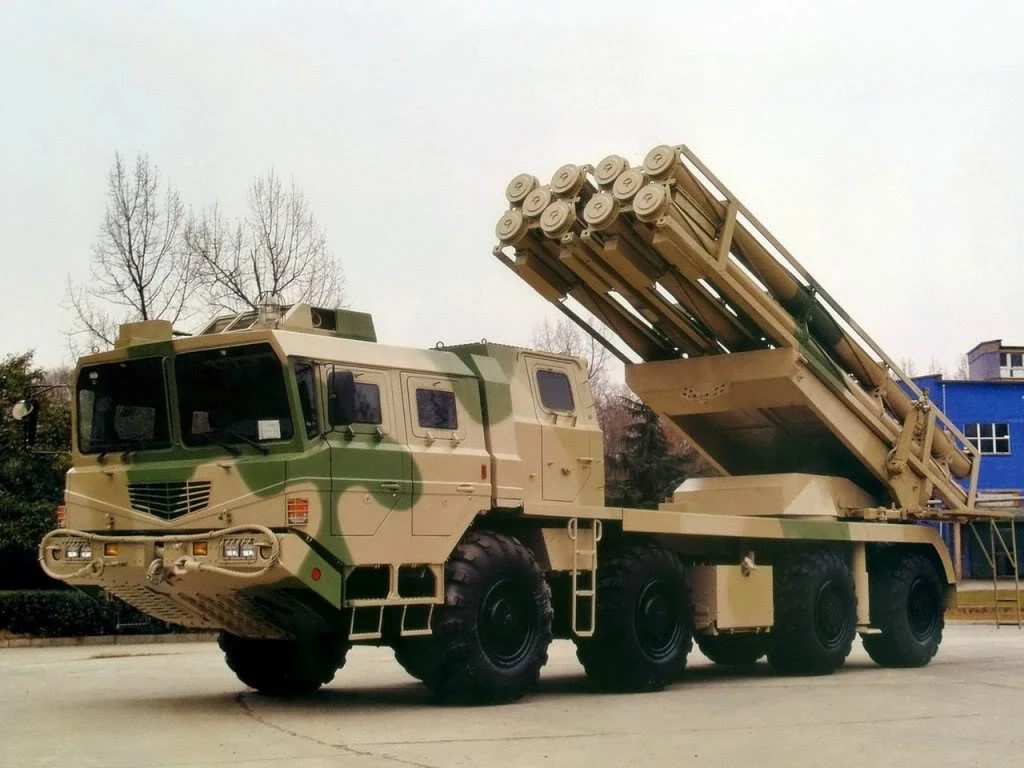
AR-1A variant with two modular rocket pods

- PHL-03 – Chinese military designation
- AR-1 – Initial version of the PHL-03.
- AR-1A – Chinese development of the AR-1. A 10-round version of the AR-1, with two launching modules, each containing five rocket tubes.
- AR-2 – Development of the AR-1. Export version.
- AR-3 – Development of the AR-1. Export version with 300 mm (12 in) or 370 mm (15 in) rockets

== Operators ==
China

- People's Liberation Army Ground Force – 175 systems

Cambodia

- Royal Cambodian Armed Forces - 6 systems

Morocco

- Royal Moroccan Army – 36 systems

Ethiopia

- Ethiopian Ground Forces – 4
- Tigray Defense Forces

Armenia - AR-1A (Reported)

== See also ==
- A-100 - competitor to the PHL-03
- WS-1 (Weishi rockets) - competitor to the PHL-03
- WM-80 - competitor to the PHL-03
- SY-400 - competitor to the PHL-03
- M270 Multiple Launch Rocket System
- BM-30 Smerch
