= BRE (rocket) =

Chinese guided missiles

BRE (export name: Fire Dragon/King Dragon) is a series of guided rockets (missiles) manufactured by Chinese Norinco.

The largest version is the BRE8, export name Fire Dragon 480 (previously Fire Dragon 280A). It is a 750 mm tactical ballistic missile, with a 480 kg warhead and range of 280–300 km, for the AR-3 launcher. It uses inertial plus satellite guidance with a CEP accuracy of about 30m.

A similar missile is the 610 mm caliber King Dragon 300, with a range of 300 km and precision guidance, for the SR-5 launcher.

The rockets are currently in service with the People's Liberation Army, as the PHL-16.

== Variants ==
Unguided 122mm

- Standard HE: High explosive warhead. 40 km range.
- BRE1: High explosive warhead. 50 km range.

Guided 122mm

- BRE7/Fire Dragon 40A: 40 km range. GPS/INS guided with CEP 25m and minimum distance 20 km.

Guided 220mm

- GR1/King Dragon 60: 70 km range. Terminal laser homing guidance and GPS/INS guided. Minimum range 25 km.

Unguided 300mm

- BRC3: Cargo warhead, 70 km range
- BRC4: Cargo warhead, 130 km range
- BRE2: High explosive warhead, 130 km range

Guided 300mm

- BRE3/FD140A: 130 km range; also known as Fire Dragon 140A

Guided 370mm

- BRE6/FD220: 220 km range, 30m CEP

Guided 610mm

- King Dragon 300: 300 km range

Guided 370mm

- BRE8/FD280: 360 km range for BRE8, 280 km range, 30m CEP for export version

Anti-ship missiles 380mm

- TL-7B
