= A-100 (multiple rocket launcher) =

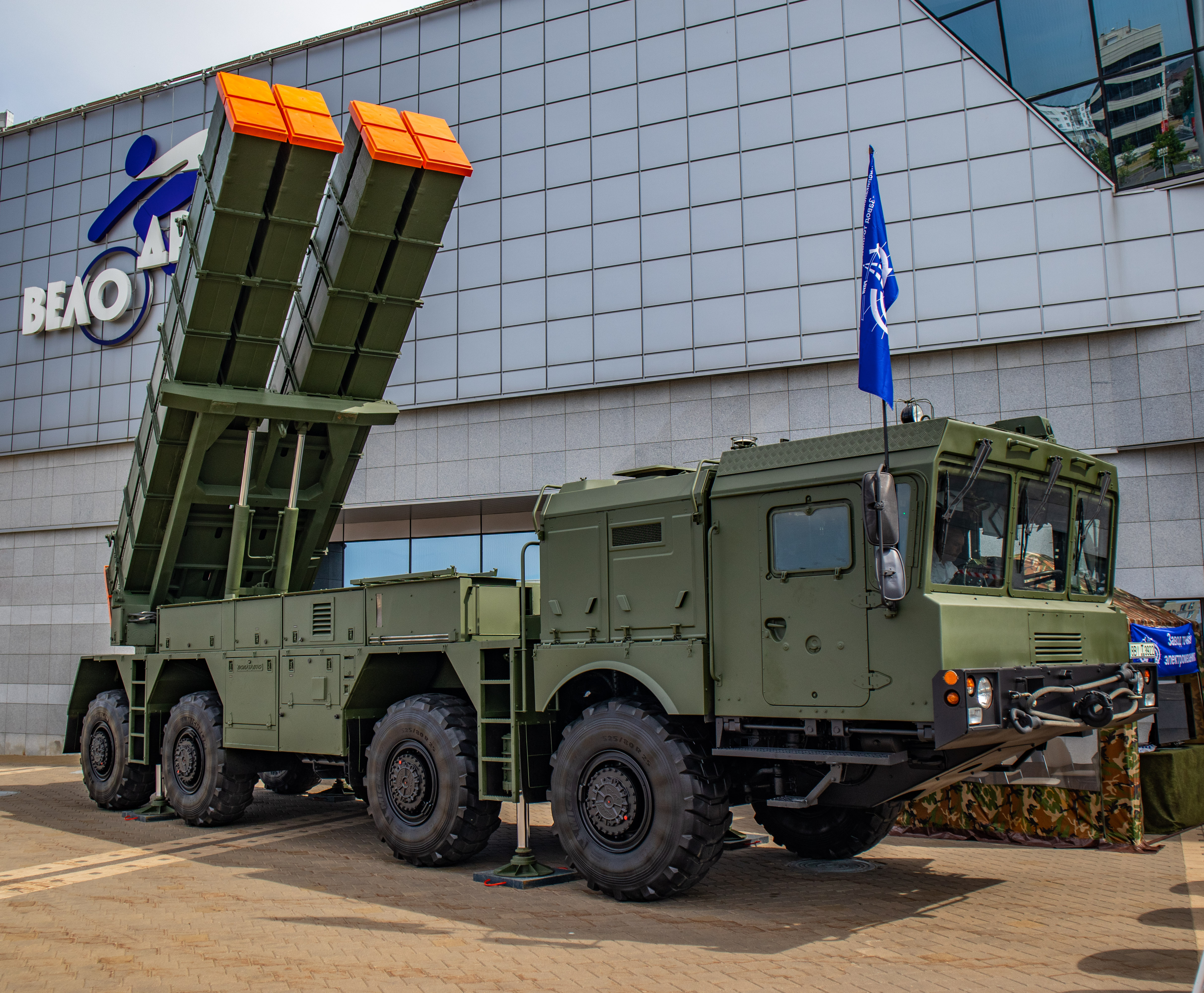
- Polonez, Belarusian derivative of the A-200
- Type: Multiple rocket launcher
- Place of origin: China

Service history
- In service: 2000-present
- Wars: Tigray War; 2024 Iranian missile strikes in Pakistan

Production history
- Designer: China Academy of Launch Vehicle Technology
- Designed: 1997-2000
- Manufacturer: China Academy of Launch Vehicle Technology

Specifications
- Mass: 45 t
- Length: 9 m (29 ft 6 in)
- Width: 2.8 m (9 ft)
- Height: 3.2 m (10 ft)
- Crew: 4
- Caliber: 300 mm (12 in)
- Barrels: 10
- Maximum firing range: 40–100 km (25–62 mi)
- Main armament: Rockets
- Engine: diesel 640 hp (480 kW)
- Suspension: 8×8 wheeled
- Operational range: 650 km (400 mi)
- Maximum speed: 60 km/h (37 mph)

The A-100 is a 300 mm (12 in), 10-tube multiple rocket launcher developed by the China Academy of Launch Vehicle Technology (CALT), a subsidiary of the China Aerospace Science and Technology Corporation (CASC).

The system was not deployed with the Chinese military after losing an internal bidding competition; however, the system was exported to Pakistan.

== History and development ==
In the 1980s, the People's Liberation Army Ground Force planned to procure long-range multiple rocket launchers and explored options from several Chinese military corporations. Four companies bid in the competition:

- AR-1 rocket system developed by Changchun subsidiary of the China North Industries Group Corporation (Norinco).
- A-100 rocket system developed by the China Academy of Launch Vehicle Technology (CALT), a subsidiary of the China Aerospace Science and Technology Corporation (CASC).
- WS-1 (Weishi rockets) rocket system developed by Sichuan 7th Academy, a subsidiary of the China Aerospace Science and Technology Corporation (CASC).
- WM-80 rocket system developed by the Qiqihar subsidiary of the China North Industries Group Corporation (Norinco).

In the end, the AR-1 multiple rocket launcher system was chosen by the People's Liberation Army Ground Force, which received designation PHL-03. After the competition, these companies started to export their products. China Aerospace Science and Industry Corporation (CASIC) did not participate in the bidding process due to time constraints, but CASIC revealed its first MLRS design, SY-400, in the Zhuhai Airshow 2008.

The CALT planned to develop a reverse-engineered BM-30 Smerch, similar to the technical approach done by the AR-1 system. To set itself apart from the competition, CALT implemented the gyroscope in the rockets for an accurate, guided strike. However, the integration of the gyroscope was unsatisfactory during the test, resulting in a lower accuracy compared to the winner, AR-1 (PHL-03); thus, the A-100 system was not chosen by the PLA.

To export the product, CALT cut down the unnecessary guidance system to the rockets, making the A-100 rocket affordable to the developing countries.

By 2015, Pakistan had approximately 60 A-100E vehicles delivers by China. On 4 January 2019, the Pakistan Army officially inducted an locally-developed version of the A-100 rocket into its Artillery Regiment Corps, with the Inter-Services Public Relations (ISPR) framing the system as an indigenous development designed to enhance firepower.

== Rocket specifications ==
- Rocket calibre: 300mm
- Rocket length: 7,300mm
- Rocket weight: 840 kg
- Warhead: 235 kg, ~500 submunitions
- Firing range: 40~100 km

The A-100 fires 300 mm solid propellant rockets, with a firing range of 40~100 km. The A-100 rocket is 7.3m in length, weighs 840 kg, carries a 235 kg warhead, and is stabilised by spin, thrust, and stabilising fins. It is fitted with a warhead containing 500 HE-FRAG (High Explosive Fragmentation) anti-armour/personnel submunitions. The submunition can penetrate 50mm of armour, and has a blast radius of 7m. The submunitions have a spreading radius of 100 +/- 40 metres.

The rocket consists of the warhead and fuse, a thrust stabilising system, a rocket motor and the tail section. The rocket motor is a single chamber, solid rocket motor with an advanced hydroxy-terminated polybutadiene (HTPB) composition rocket propellant. The stabilising fins are folded inside the launch tube and open once the rocket leaves the tube.

The rocket is equipped with an onboard computer to help correct the horizontal and vertical deviations. During the first three seconds of the rocket's flight, the onboard computer detects the horizontal difference between the programmed trajectory and actual status of the rocket, and controls the rocket's stabilising thrust system to correct the rocket's flying direction. The onboard computer corrects the vertical deviation by adjusting the warhead detonation time so that the submunitions are spread with high accuracy.

== Launch vehicle ==
- Launch vehicle road speed: 60 km/h
- Launch vehicle travelling range: 650 km
- Reloading time: 20 minutes

The launch vehicle is based on a Taian TAS4500 8X8 wheeled truck chassis developed by Tai'an Special Vehicle Manufactory. The vehicle weights 21t and has a maximum load of 22t. The vehicle has a maximum road speed of 60 km/h and a maximum range of 650 km. The vehicles has a gradient of 57% and a fording depth of 1.1m. The vehicle is equipped with four hydraulically operated stabilisers which are lowered in preparation for the rocket launch. 10 launcher tubes mounted on the chassis are arranged as two blocks of four (top) and six (bottom) tubes.

== Variants ==
A100E
Export version
A200
Development of A100 with simple cascade inertial terminal guidance updated by GPS. The arrangement of A200 is different from A100 in that each launching box consists of three rows of launching tubes, three on the top and bottom respectively, and two in the middle. A200 rockets also have additional forward control surfaces that were not present on A100 rockets.
A300
Development of A200 with a range of 290 km and integrated GNSS/INS guidance.

== Operators ==
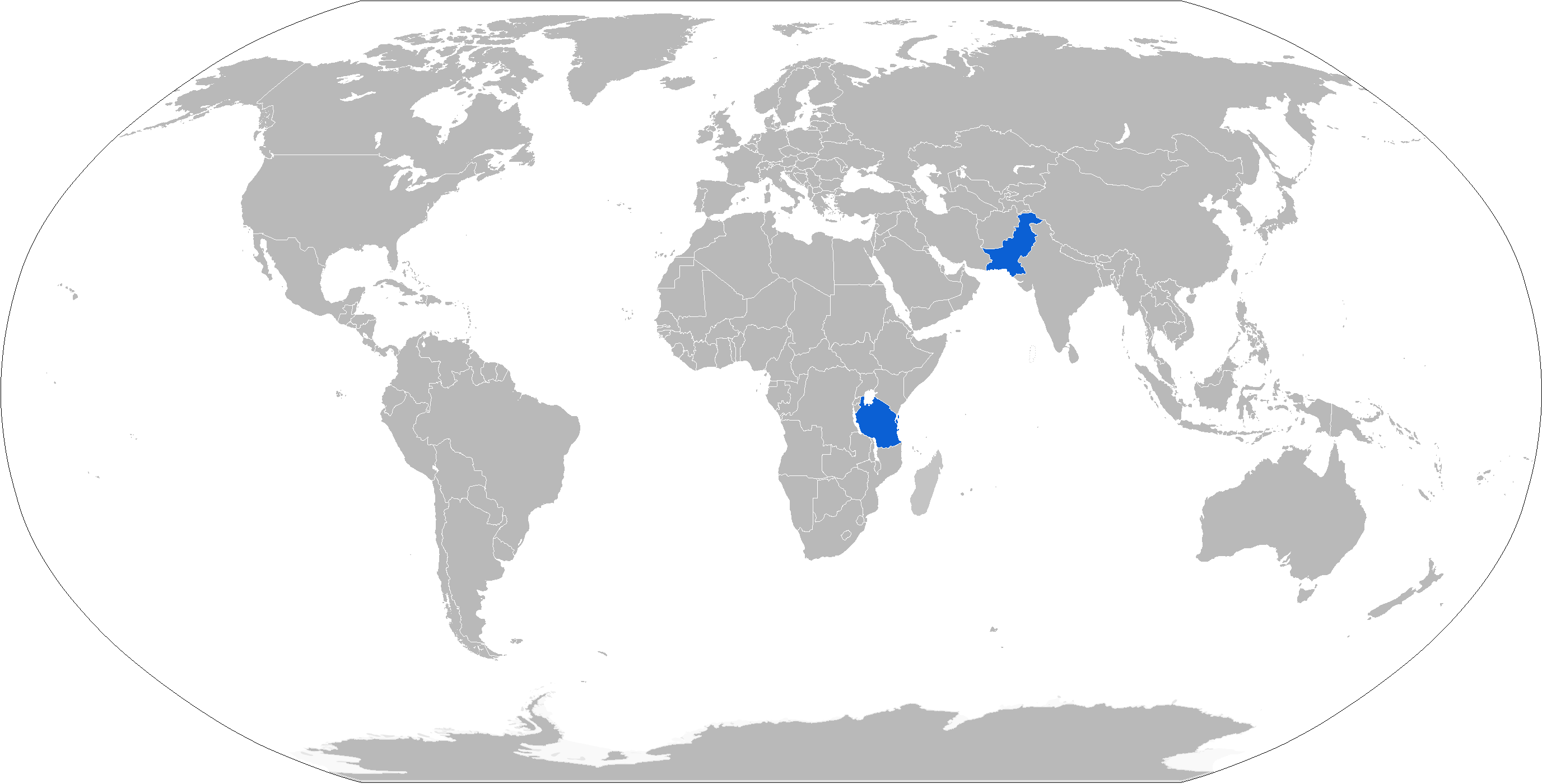
Map of A-100 operators in blue

=== Current operators ===
- Azerbaijan - Azerbaijani Armed Forces - Received six Polonez vehicles from Belarus in 2018.
- Belarus - Armed Forces of Belarus - Local production of A-200 known as Polonez. Received six A-200 systems from China by 2016.
- Pakistan - Pakistan Armed Forces - Approximately 450+ A-100E vehicles in service.
- Tanzania - Tanzania People's Defence Force - 12 A-100 MLRS received from China in 2013.
- Ethiopia - A200
  - Tigray People's Liberation Front - A200

=== Failed trials ===
- China - People's Liberation Army - The A-100 MRL was trialed by the PLA in 2002, but the PHL03 was selected instead.

== See also ==
- Polonez (multiple rocket launcher)
- AR-1 - competitor to the A-100
- WS-1 (Weishi rockets) - competitor to the A-100
- WM-80 - competitor to the A-100
- SY-400 - competitor to the A-100
