= WM-80 =

Multiple rocket launcher

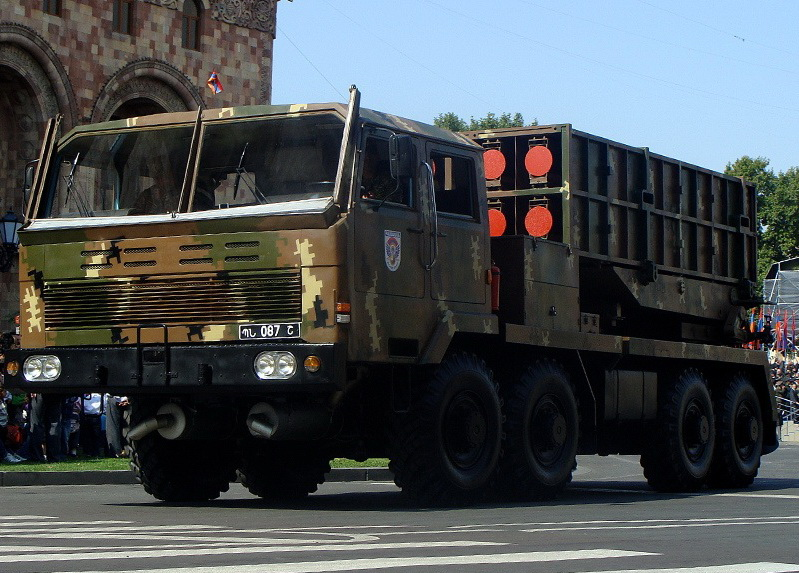
WM-80 on Independence Day Parade in Yerevan.

The WM-80 is a multiple rocket launcher developed by the Qiqihar subsidiary of the China North Industries Group Corporation (Norinco). It was formerly used by the People's Liberation Army of China and exported to other countries.

== History and development ==
In the 1980s, the People's Liberation Army Ground Force planned to procure long-range multiple rocket launchers and explored options from several Chinese military corporations. Four companies bid in the competition:

- AR-1 rocket system developed by Changchun subsidiary of the China North Industries Group Corporation (Norinco).
- A-100 rocket system developed by the China Academy of Launch Vehicle Technology (CALT), a subsidiary of the China Aerospace Science and Technology Corporation (CASC).
- WS-1 (Weishi rockets) rocket system developed by Sichuan 7th Academy, a subsidiary of the China Aerospace Science and Technology Corporation (CASC).
- WM-80 rocket system developed by the Qiqihar subsidiary of the China North Industries Group Corporation (Norinco).

In the end, the AR-1 multiple rocket launcher system was chosen by the People's Liberation Army Ground Force, which received designation PHL-03. After the competition, these companies started to export their products. The China Aerospace Science and Industry Corporation (CASIC) did not participate in the bidding process due to time constraints, but CASIC revealed its first MLRS design, SY-400, in the Zhuhai Airshow 2008.

Unlike other contenders in the competition, the WM-80 was not a newly developed system, but an older system with an outdated 273 mm (10.7 in) caliber, combined with the fact that WM-80 was not a guided rocket, resulting in poor accuracy during the test. WM-80 was the first rocket system that was eliminated in the competition.

== Variants ==
WM-40 (Type 83)
Original prototype

WM-40
The MRL system was developed by Norinco on Chinese designed Type 83 (WM-40) 273mm. It adopts a modular design, with two launcher boxes each containing four ready-to-launch rocket rounds on a TAS-5380 8x8 truck chassis.

WM-120
The WM-120 multi-barrel rocket launcher system is a development based on WM-80. The launch tube has a diameter of 273 mm (10.7 in), with the use of solid fuel rockets, the maximum range of 120 km (75 mi), a minimum range of 34 km (21 mi), a circular error probability of about 20 meters, and is equipped with a global positioning system and inertial guidance device.

== Operators ==
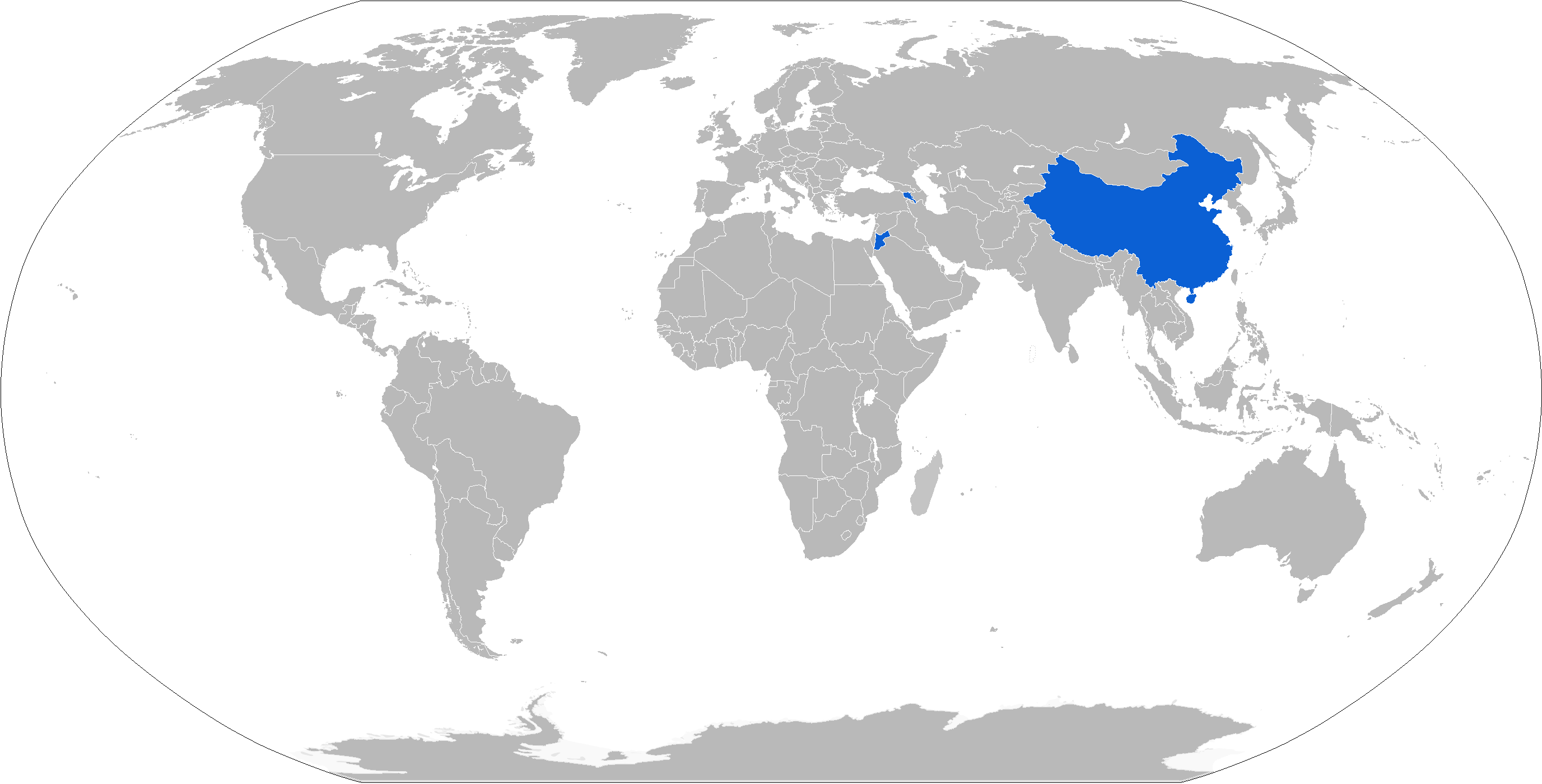
Map of WM-80 operators in blue

=== Current operators ===
- Armenia - 8 vehicles bought in 1999.
- Jordan - 24 WM-120 systems purchased from Norinco-China in 2010. (It has appeared as part of military exercises conducted by Jordanian Armed Forces)
- Iran - Purchased from the PRC in the 1980s, license produced in Iran as Oghab rocket artillery.

=== Former operators ===
- China

== See also ==
- AR-1 - competitor to the WM-80
- A-100 - competitor to the WM-80
- WS-1 (Weishi rockets) - competitor to the WM-80
- SY-400 - competitor to the WM-80
