= Zhenhua Oil =

Chinese state-owned oil company

- Type: State-owned
- Industry: Oil and gas industry
- Founded: 2003; 23 years ago
- Parent: Norinco
- Website: www.zhenhuaoil.com

Zhenhua Oil is the oil exploration and production subsidiary of Chinese state-owned defense contractor Norinco. The company was set up in 2003.

According to the company in 2017, it maintains oil and gas exploration and production operations in 11 countries including Egypt, Myanmar, Kazakhstan and Iraq. In particular it is active in Iraq with upstream investments and a marketing joint venture with the State Oil Marketing Organization, the Iraqi state oil marketing arm. The company is also reported to have been active in Iran, supplying as much as one third of the country's gasoline imports by 2010. In 2017 a consortium around Zhenhua agreed to purchase gas fields in Bangladesh from Chevron, however the transaction was blocked by the local government.

In March 2025, Zhenhua Oil halted purchases of Russian oil due to international sanctions during the Russian invasion of Ukraine.
