= SY-400 =

Chinese long-range multiple launch rocket systems

The Shenying (SY; Chinese: 神鹰; lit. 'Divine Eagle') is a family of multiple rocket launcher systems (MLRS) developed by China Aerospace Science and Industry Corporation (CASIC).

== History and development ==
In the 1980s, the People's Liberation Army Ground Force planned to procure long-range multiple rocket launchers and explored options from several Chinese military corporations. Four companies bid in the competition:

- AR-1 rocket system developed by Changchun subsidery of the China North Industries Group Corporation (Norinco).
- A-100 rocket system developed by China Academy of Launch Vehicle Technology (CALT), a subsidery of the China Aerospace Science and Technology Corporation (CASC).
- WS-1 (Weishi rockets) rocket system developed by Sichuan 7th Academy, a subsidery of the China Aerospace Science and Technology Corporation (CASC).
- WM-80 rocket system developed by the Qiqihar subsidery of the China North Industries Group Corporation (Norinco).

In the end, the AR-1 multiple rocket launcher system was chosen by the People's Liberation Army Ground Force, which received designation PHL-03. After the competition, these companies started to export their products. China Aerospace Science and Industry Corporation (CASIC) did not participate in the bidding process due to time constraints, but CASIC revealed its first MLRS design, SY-400, in the Zhuhai Airshow 2008. The SY-400 rocket was developed from the B-611 ballistic missile but with a smaller size and a caliber of 400 mm (16 in). The BP-12A tactical ballistic missile was presented as an optional armament. In the 2014 Zhuhai Airshow, the CASIC unveiled the SY-300 MLRS, a 300 mm (12 in) variant of the SY-400.

In 2017, Qatar received an unknown number of SY-400.

== SY-400 ==
The SY-400 tactical ballistic missile system is modular. It can carry either eight 400 mm (16 in) SY-400 rockets with a range of 180 km (110 mi), two BP-12A tactical ballistic missiles with a range of 400 km (250 mi), or twelve 300 mm (12 in) rockets. As a low-cost alternative to more expensive ballistic missiles, the accuracy of SY-400 is increased by adding satellite positioning to correct the inertial navigation (INS) guidance. According to the developer, the accuracy can be further improved if military grade satellite signals are used instead of the civilian GPS. Another feature of SY-400 is that it shares the same launching vehicle and fire control system of BP-12A ballistic missile, thus simplifying logistics.

== SY-300 ==
SY-300 is a development of SY-400, designed after the merger of China Aerospace Science and Industry Corporation (CASIC) 4th Academy and the 9th Academy. The SY-300 rocket is a simplified, smaller version of the SY-400, as the latter was considered too expensive. The main difference is that SY-300 replaced the small thruster rockets at the front section on SY-400 for four control fins, which reduces the price. The SY-300 also has a modular guidance section that can be removed, turning the SY-300 into an unguided rocket.

== Operators ==
- Qatar

== See also ==
- AR-1 - competitor to the SY-400
- A-100 - competitor to the SY-400
- WS-1 (Weishi rockets) - competitor to the SY-400
- WM-80 - competitor to the SY-400
- CM-400
