= KN-09 (multiple rocket launcher) =

- Type: Multiple rocket launcher
- Place of origin: North Korea

Service history
- In service: 2016 – present
- Used by: North Korea

Production history
- Designed: 2014
- Produced: 2014 – present
- No. built: 10–100 (estimate)

Specifications
- Caliber: 300 mm (12 in)
- Barrels: 8
- Rate of fire: 8 rockets per 45 minutes
- Maximum firing range: 100–200 km (120 mi)
- Engine: diesel
- Payload capacity: ~ 75 kg TNT equivalent (estimate)
- Suspension: 6x6 wheeled

The KN-09 (K-SS-X-9) is a North Korean 300 mm rocket artillery system of a launcher unit comprising eight rockets packaged in two four-rocket pods.

== Design ==
The KN-09 is suspected to be derived from similar 300 mm caliber MRLs such as the Russian BM-30 Smerch, Chinese WS-1B, or even Syrian M-302. The truck used in the KN-09 is reported to be the Chinese-made civilian version of Sinotruk HOWO truck repurposed for military use. It was first seen in 2014 when South Korea and the United States were conducting their joint exercises.

While the designation 'KN-09' appeared to initially refer to the locally developed Kh-35 (locally named Kumsong-3), it was later clarified that it refers to this MRL system.

South Korea estimates the 300 mm rockets have a range of 180–200 km (110–120 mi) with a 190 kg (420 lb) payload, much longer than the Korean People's Army Ground Force's previous longest-range MRL, the 240 mm M1985/M1991 with range of 60–65 km (37–40 mi). While this was more than enough to threaten Seoul, the KN-09's range can cover half of South Korea, including the ROK military's Gyeryongdae complex in South Chungcheong Province as well as the city of Daejeon, and threaten major United States Forces Korea military bases like Pyeongtaek and Osan Air Base, 97 km (60 mi) south of Seoul. The 300 mm rockets are probably (without knowing exact characteristics of KN-09 just comparing calibers) three times as powerful as the BM-21's 122 mm rocket, and fragmentation-mine shells and underground penetration shells are also in production; they may have some type of guidance system. South Korea believes the KN-09 may enter operational service by the end of 2016.

North Korean state-run Korean Central News Agency (KCNA) released photos of the KN-09 in March 2016, revealing improvements to the system. The 6×6 launcher truck features armored louvers to protect the windshield from rocket blasts, and the eight launch tubes are contained in two pods of four rockets, decreasing reload time as pods can be preloaded with missiles and swapped out faster than reloading individual tubes. Although the MRL's design is suspected to be based on Russian and Chinese large-caliber rocket artillery, with guidance likely coming from Russian GLONASS or Chinese Beidou navigation system, the rockets have two control fins on their heads, a guidance characteristic of the American M31 GMLRS that has four small wings attached to the head of the rocket for accuracy and the Indian Pinaka Mk-II, a feature not present on the 9K58 Smerch. Based on the highly classified document, the North appears to have completed the development and deployment of 300 mm multiple rocket launchers equipped with imagery-guidance and GPS systems that can hit Daejeon, where the joint military headquarters of the army, navy and air force are located. The potentially accurate guidance of the rockets would likely result in this system being used to target objects of military importance, such as airfields in South Korea.

In the 2020 and 2022 military parades, the KN-09 has been displayed in parades with a greater number of rockets than originally shown, increased to 12 launch tubes, mounted on a modified 8x8 ZIL-135 chassis. The system was also analysed to have entered into deployment by 2018.

== See also ==
- Hwasong-11A (KN-23)
- Hwasong-11B (KN-24)
- Hwasong-11D
- KN-25 ('super large calibre multiple rocket launcher')
