= Weishi rockets =

Chinese long-range multiple launch rocket systems

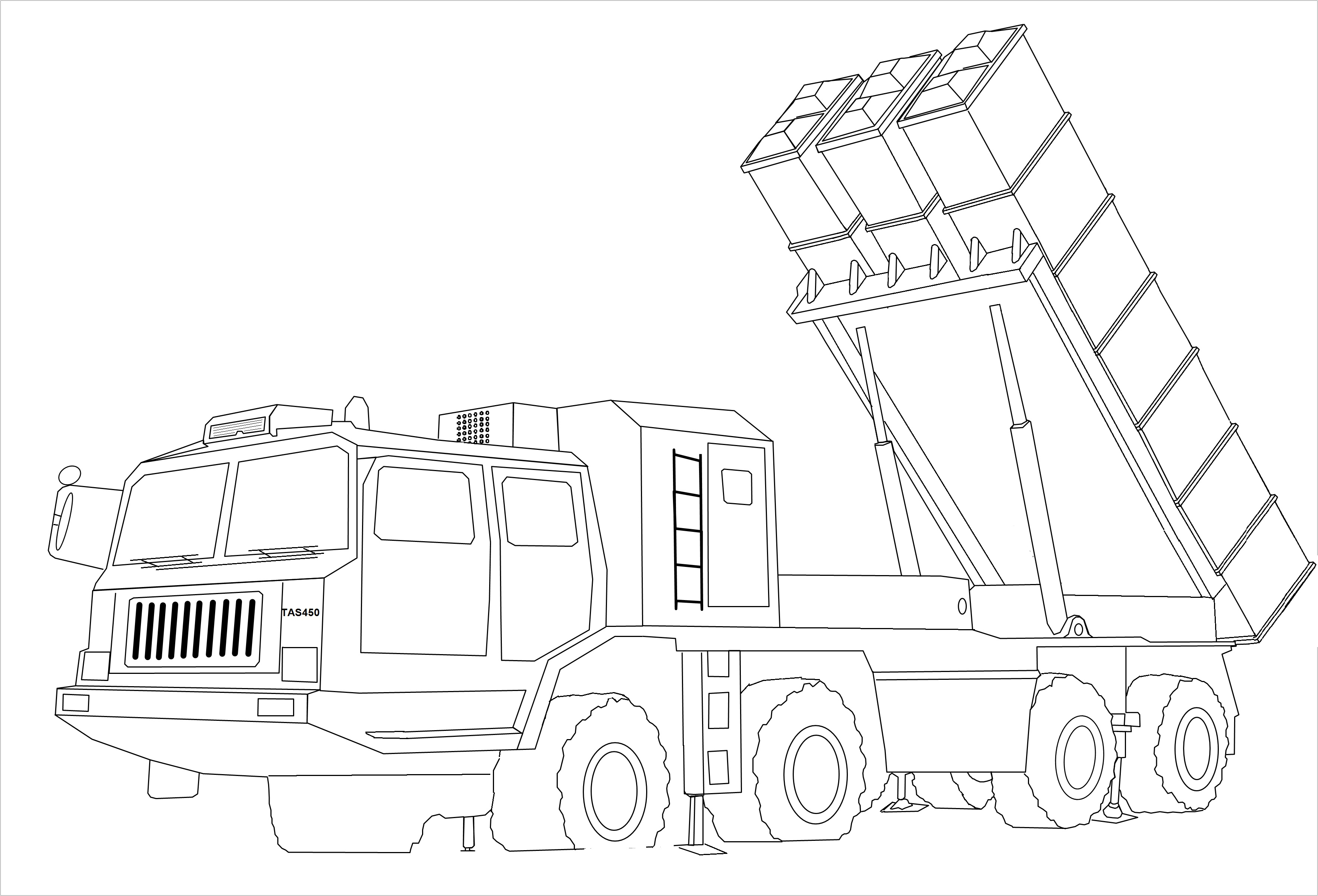
Weishi WS-2D

The Weishi (WS; Chinese: 卫士; lit. 'Guardian') family of multiple rocket launcher systems were mainly developed by Sichuan Academy of Aerospace Technology (SAAT, also known as Base 062) in the central province of Sichuan, China at Chengdu city. The systems include the 302 mm (11.9 in) WS-1 (100 km (62 mi; 54 nmi)), the improved 302 mm (11.9 in) WS-1B (180 km (110 mi; 97 nmi)), the 122 mm (4.8 in) WS-1E (40 km (25 mi; 22 nmi)), the 400 mm (16 in) WS-2 (200 km (120 mi; 110 nmi)), as well as many other models. The Weishi series rocket system did not enter PLA service, but was exported to several countries.

== History and development ==
In the 1980s, the People's Liberation Army Ground Force planned to procure long-range multiple rocket launchers and explored options from several Chinese military corporations. Four companies bid in the competition:

- AR-1 rocket system developed by Changchun subsidiary of the China North Industries Group Corporation (Norinco).
- A-100 rocket system developed by the China Academy of Launch Vehicle Technology (CALT), a subsidiary of the China Aerospace Science and Technology Corporation (CASC).
- WS-1 (Weishi rockets) rocket system developed by Sichuan 7th Academy, a subsidiary of the China Aerospace Science and Technology Corporation (CASC).
- WM-80 rocket system developed by the Qiqihar subsidiary of the China North Industries Group Corporation (Norinco).

In the end, the AR-1 multiple rocket launcher system was chosen by the People's Liberation Army Ground Force, which received designation PHL-03. After the competition, these companies started to export their products. The China Aerospace Science and Industry Corporation (CASIC) did not participate in the bidding process due to time constraints, but CASIC revealed its first MLRS design, SY-400, in the Zhuhai Airshow 2008.

Unlike AR-1 and A-100, the WS-1 and WM-80 are not guided rockets, resulting in their poor accuracy at their maximum range. The accuracy problem was one of the reasons behind WS-1's failure in securing the bid. After receiving feedback, the Sichuan 7th Academy began to improve the WS-1 rockets, resulting in WS-1B and other Weishi rockets with guided ammo. Weishi rockets are one of the most exported Chinese rocket systems due to their affordability.

Turkey was the first customer of the WS-1 rocket, buying WS-1B in 1996. Turkey soon reverse-engineered the WS-1B and made a copy called TR-300.

== WS-1 ==
SCAIC began to develop an unguided large-calibre multiple launch rocket system for the PLA ground forces in the late 1980s. The resulting Weishi-1 (WS-1) 302 mm, 4-tube multiple rocket system was first tested in 1990. However, the weapon system failed to impress the PLA, and no production order was received. The ground equipment of the WS-1 comprises: a rocket launch truck, a transport and loading truck and a firing command truck.

A WS-1 rocket battalion is equipped with:

- DZ-88B firing command truck (4 men): 1;
- MF-4 rocket launch truck (3 men): 6~9;
- QY-88 transport and loading truck (3 men): 6~9;
- High-altitude meteorological radar (3 men): 1;
- Rockets per launch truck: 40~60;

The Syrian M-302 (also known as the Khaibar-1) is based on the WS-1 rocket.

=== WS-1B ===
SCAIC continued the WS-1 development in the 1990s and introduced the improved WS-1B in the late 1990s. The WS-1B mainly targeted foreign customers and was actively marketed by Beijing-based China National Precision Machinery Corporation (CPMIEC). Compared to the WS-1, the WS-1B features an increased range of 180 km.

A WS-1B rocket battalion is equipped with:

- DZ-4B firing command truck (5 men): 1;
- HF-4B rocket launch truck (3 men): 6~9;
- QY-4B transport and loading truck (3 men): 6~9;
- Type 702 high-altitude meteorological radar (3 men): 1;
- Rockets per launch truck: 40~60;

=== WS-1E ===
The WS-1E is the 122 mm multiple rocket system developed by SCAIC as a successor to the PLA's current Type 81 122 mm rocket system. It is similar to the Type 90 122 mm rocket system and did not enter production. A WS-1E rocket battalion is equipped with:

- DZ-88B firing command truck (5 men): 1;
- MF-40 rocket launch truck (3 men): 6;
- Rockets per launch truck: 120~160;

=== WS-1F ===
Little is known except that range reaches 500 km (310 mi; 270 nmi).

=== T-300 Kasırga ===
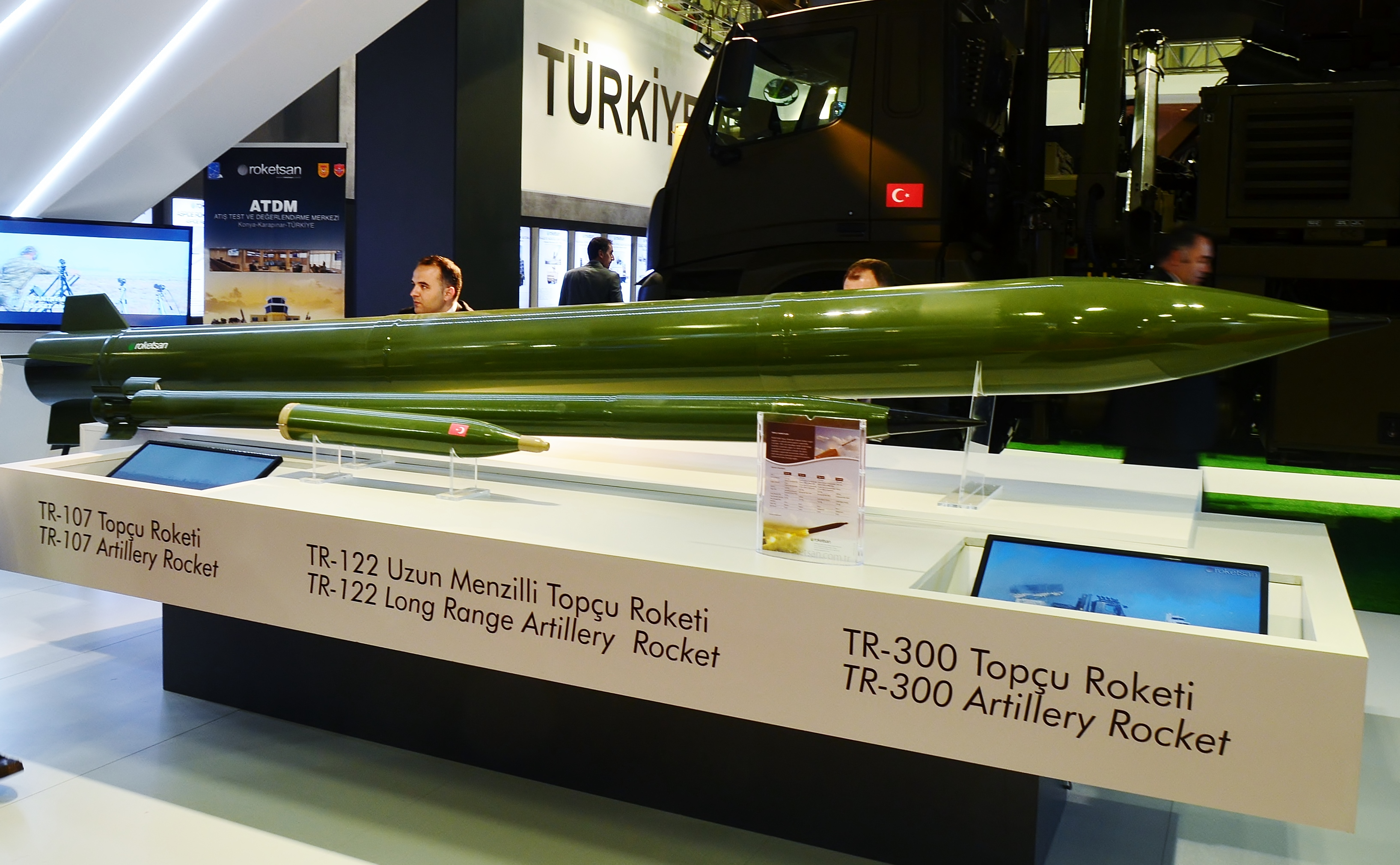
300 mm rocket for T-300

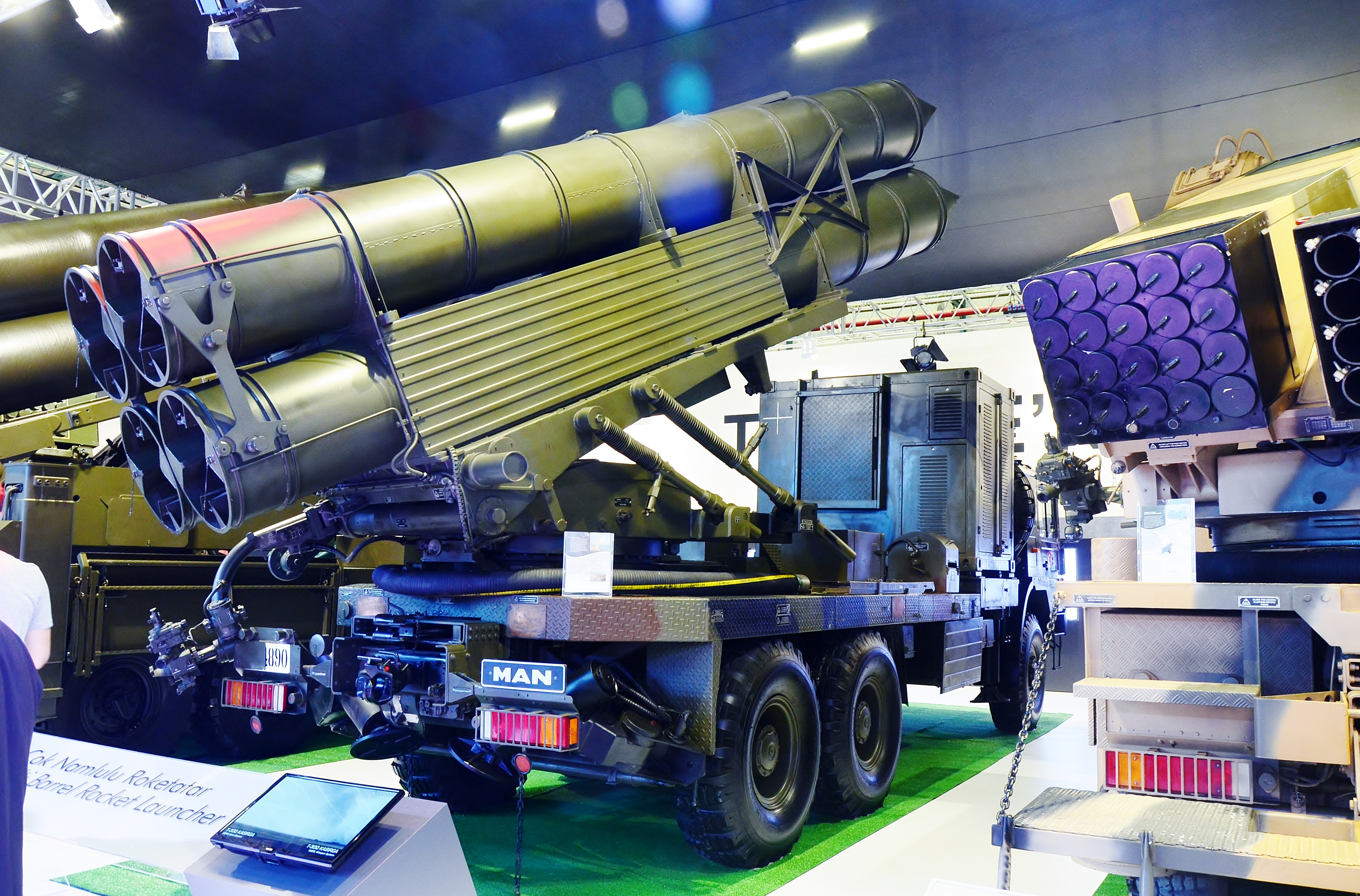
Turkish T-300 Kasırga.

The Turkish missile system, TRG-300 Kasırga MBRL (also called TRG-300) is based on Chinese WS-1B (Wei Shi; Guardian), with some modifications on the design with launcher very similar to the WS-1B's launcher. In Turkish land forces service, the 302 mm T-300 Kasirga MBRL system provides long range fire support.

The T-300 Kasirga MBRLS consists of two key parts: The launcher system (T-300) and the rocket, TR-300. The T-300 MBRL is based on the German MAN (6×6) 26.372 10t cross-country truck chassis. Combat weight, complete with four rockets, is 23t. This MAN (6×6) also serves as T-122 launch platform for Turkish land forces command. F-302T, the launcher vehicle's cabin windows are provided with shutters which are lowered before the rockets are launched.

- TR300S:Unguided, range: 36–65 km
- TR300E:Unguided, range: 65–100 km
- TR300K:Guided, range: 30–120 km

== WS-2 ==
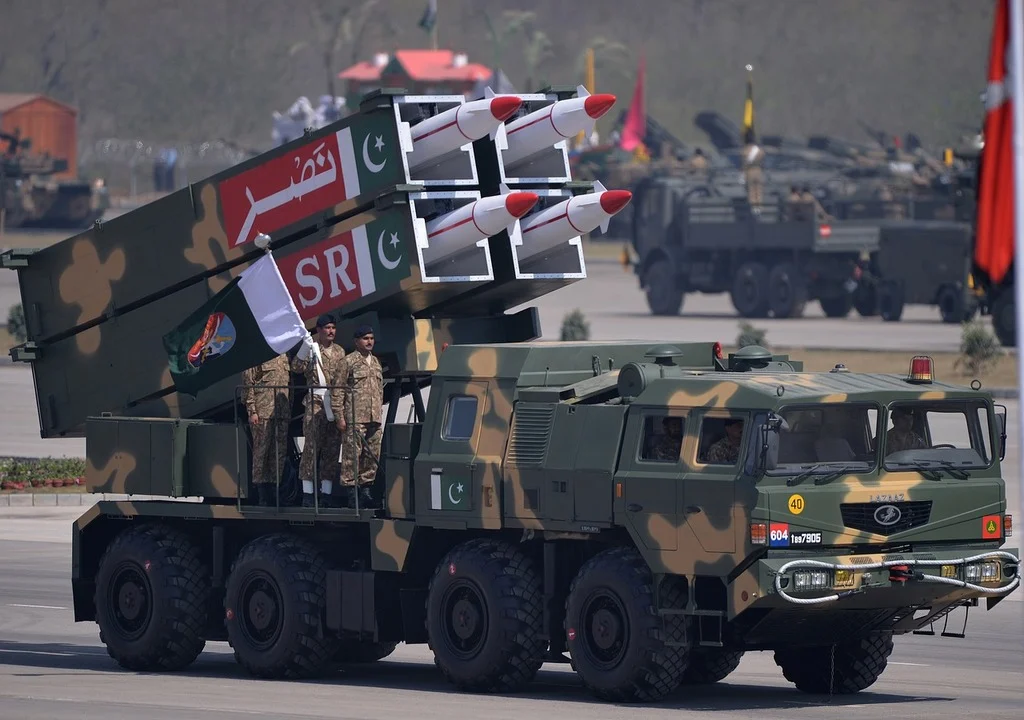
Pakistan Army Nasr ballistic missile system

During the 2004 Zhuhai Air Show, SCAIC revealed its latest WS-2 multiple launch rocket system. The weapon is fitted with 6 box-shape launchers and fires 400 mm rockets to a maximum range of 200 km, however some sources claim that it might be up to 350 km. This enables the PLA to strike the west coast of Taiwan, including the capital Taipei. It is speculated that WS-2 is going to be a cheaper alternative to the expensive short range ballistic missiles in Chinese inventory. The WS-2 is fitted with a simple cascade inertial terminal guidance to compensate for the degraded accuracy caused by the long distance flight of the rocket. In 2008, it was revealed that sub-munitions are developed for WS-2, including a specialized anti-radar version, which is a rocket containing three UAVs. Once the rocket is fired to the target area, the UAVs are released the same way like other sub-munitions. The seekers would seek out target radar signals as UAVs began to cruise, and once locked on to the radar, UAV would home in and attack. Some domestic Chinese military enthusiasts have claimed such technology was based on the principle of Israeli Harpy anti-radar UAVs, but this could not be confirmed by independent sources outside China.

A WS-1E and WS-2 rocket battalion shared the same equipment and is armed with:

- Firing command truck (5 men): 1;
- Rocket launch truck (3 men): 6;
- Transport and loading truck (3 men): 6~9;
- Rockets per launch truck: 30~48;
- Preparation time (from traveling to firing) < 12 minutes
- Firing density: better than 1/600 m
- Accuracy: better than 0.3%

=== WS-2B ===
Upgraded version with 200 km range.

=== WS-2C ===
Upgraded version with GPS guidance and 350 km range. It also features passive homing guidance.

=== WS-2D ===
Upgraded version with GPS guidance and 400 km range and ability to launch lethal unmanned aerial vehicles.

== WS-3 ==
Built by China Aerospace Long-March International Trade (Alit) – a subsidiary of China Aerospace Science and Technology Corporation (CASC) – the WS-3 features 6 rectangular missile containers for 406 mm rockets, it has simple cascade inertial terminal guidance and has a range of 70-200 km.

=== WS-3A ===
Also built by ALIT, the WS-3A is an upgraded version of the WS-3 with simple cascade inertial terminal guidance updated by civilian GPS/GLONASS, but can be upgraded to military GPS/GLONASS upon customer's request.

=== WS-3 ASW missile ===
WS-3 ASW Rocket is a modified WS-3A carrying rocket-assisted anti-submarine (ASW) torpedo, which is developed by Poly Technologies, a subsidiary of China Poly Group Corporation. Payload of the rocket is a light-weight ASW torpedo and the range is up to 100 km. Target info obtained by other ASW platforms including satellite, aircraft, surface ships, submarines, coastal and sea floor sonar stations, and is passed to the launch/storage/command/control vehicle, which in turn, fires the missile in the latest contact point. As the torpedo is separated from the rocket and enters water, it seeks out and destroys target.

== WS-6 ==
Lighter version of unguided 122 mm PR50 MLS, with number of tubes reduced by 60% to 40 from the original 100 of PR50 MLS. This is a more compact version of PR50 with reduction of weight for rapid deployment.

== WS-15 ==
WS-15 MRL is a shorter range version with 40 km range, equipped with simple cascade inertial terminal guidance.

== WS-22 ==
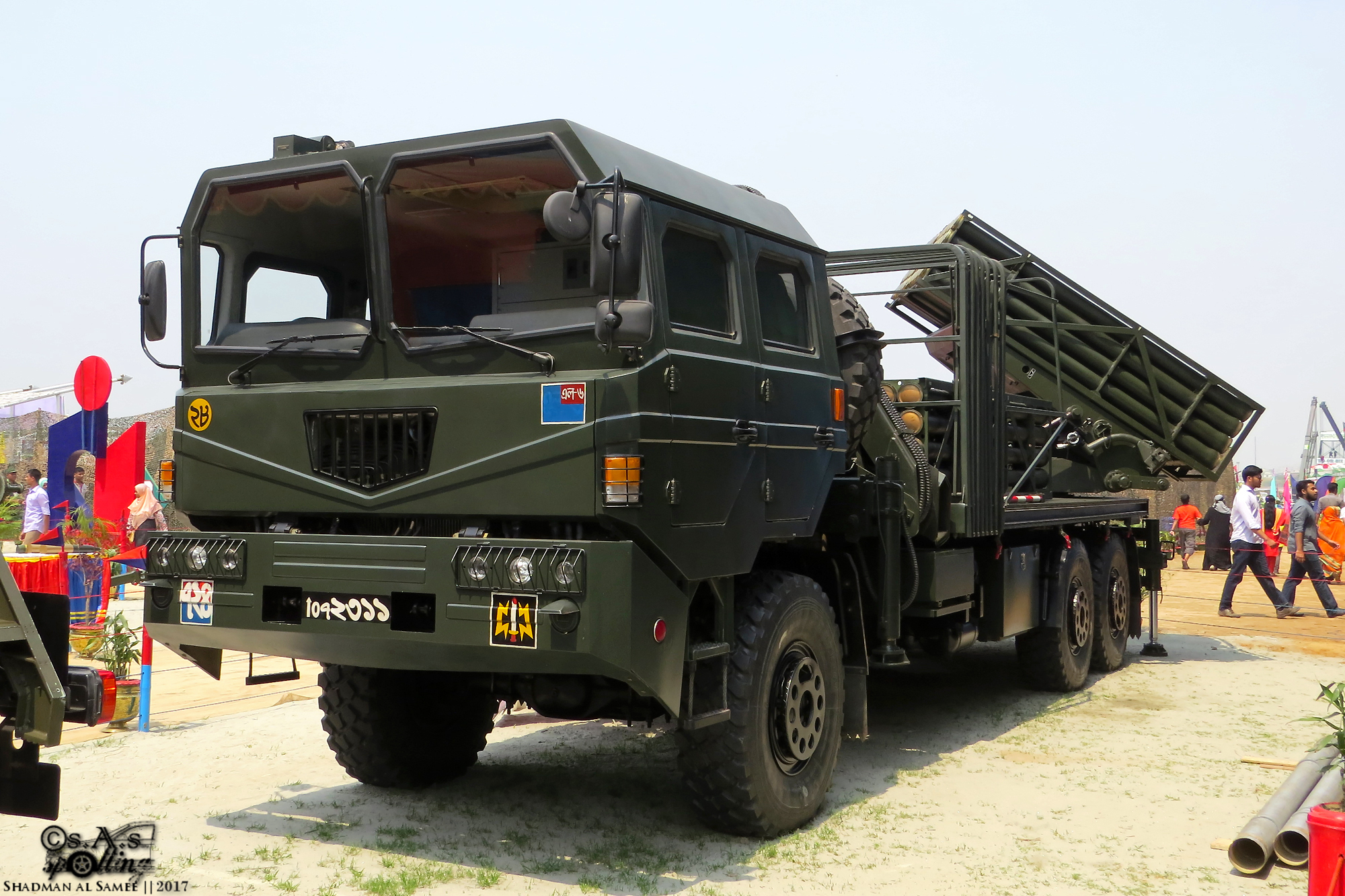
Weishi WS-22 of Bangladesh Army

WS-22 is a guided version of 122 mm PR50 MLR with simple cascade inertial terminal guidance, with standard range of 45 km.

=== PR50 MRL ===
Part of the WS export series. The vehicle has fire power increased by 25% to 50 round from the original 40 rounds. Incorporate features of WS SPMRL series so that the operating cost and overall life cycle cost for both. Also incorporated is a feature originated in Type 90B, which is the adoption of rockets of different ranges, so PR50 has a wide range of 20 km to 40 km. The Chinese name for PR50 SPMRL is Sha Chen Bao (沙尘暴), meaning Sandstorm, and the system made its public debut in 2006 at the 6th China International Aviation & Aerospace Exhibition.

== WS-32 ==
Features two containers of five 300 mm tubes each on a 8X8 truck. Missile is 7.5 m and can carry a 170 kg warhead over 150 km with 30 m CEP accuracy.

== WS-33 ==
Missile seems to be an adaptation of a Chinese anti-ship missile for ground attack roles. It is 3.3 m long, 200 kg and 200 mm caliber, can hit targets 70 km away.

== WS-35 ==
Development of WS-1 series of 150 km range with civilian GPS/GLONASS satellite guidance update, but can be upgrade to military GPS/GLONASS upon customer's request.

== WS-43 ==
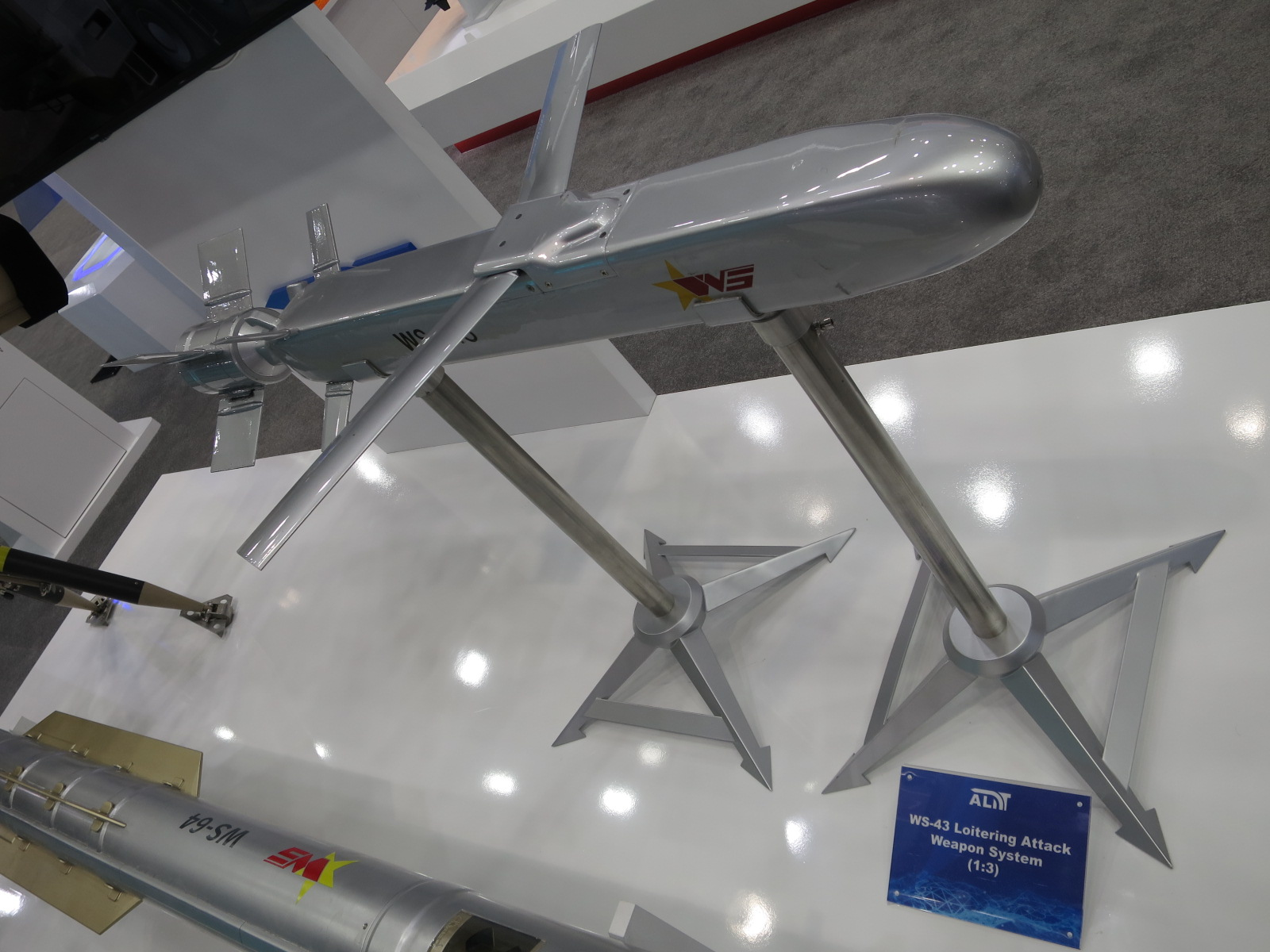
Mockup of the WS-43 loitering munition

The WS-43 cruise missile, also called loitering munition, has 200 mm caliber, 60 km range, 10 m CEP accuracy, with 30 minutes loitering time and uses a 20 kg warhead.

== WS-63 ==
Surface to surface missile, 7.4 m long and 300 mm caliber, capable of hitting targets 260 km away with different types of 150 kg warheads. Inertial/satellite guidance plus radar terminal guidance.

== WS-64 ==
WS-64 is an anti-ship missile, in different versions, with a ranges from 120 to 280 km, likely based on the HQ-16, launched by the Weishi MLRS system. CEP is 30 m when using satnav, 10 when using active radar guidance. It was revealed at the 2014 Zhuhai Air Show by CASC

== WS-400 ==
Anti-submarine missile.

== WS-600L ==
New short-range ballistic missile developed by CASC, with a range of 290 km and a CEP of less than 10 meters.

== Armament ==
The free rocket used by the WS-1 and WS-1B consists of the warhead and fuse, an FG-42/43 rocket motor, and the tail section. The FG-42/43 rocket motor is a single-chamber, solid rocket motor with an advanced hydroxy-terminated polybutadiene (HTPB) composition rocket propellant. The rocket of the WS-2 system features four control surfaces in the middle section of the rocket for terminal guidance.

The rocket can be fitted with various types of warheads, including anti-armour/personnel submunition, blasting, fuel air explosive (FAE), and high-explosive (HE). The ZDB-2 blasting warhead is loaded with steel balls and prefabricated fragments. The SZB-1 submunition warhead is designed to destroy large area targets such as armour formation and infantry troops. When the SZB-1 submunition warhead detonates, around 500 bullets are expelled under high pressure.

== Launch truck ==
The launch truck is available in a number of variants. The MF-4 launch truck is based on a Chinese indigenous 6X6 truck chassis. The HF-4 launch truck is based on the more capable Tiema XC2200 6X6 truck. The WS-2 uses a heavier 8X8 Taian TA580/TAS5380 truck chassis. The launch tubes have an elevation range of 0° to 60° and azimuth range of -30° to +30°. The truck is equipped with four hydraulically operated stabilisers which are lowered in preparation for the rocket launch.

== Operators ==
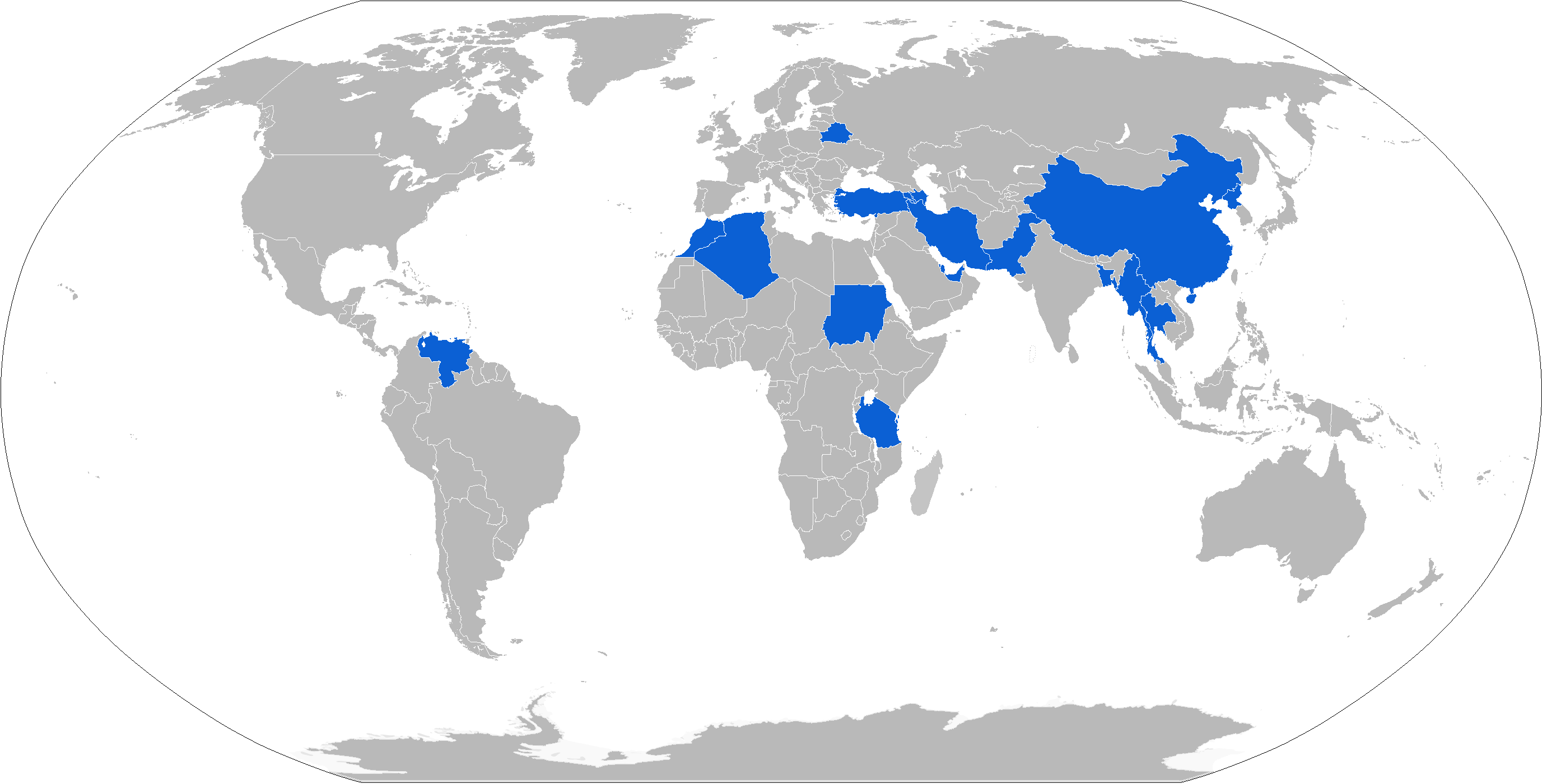
Map of Weishi operators in blue

=== Current operators ===
- Azerbaijan - T-300 Kasırga
- Bangladesh - T-300 Kasirga & WS-22
- Hamas – WS-1E
- Iran - WS-1 imported in the late 80s or early 90s.
- North Korea - WS1B KN-09 (MRL) (?)
- Palestine - M-302
- Pakistan - WS-1/WS-2, Nasr
- China
- Sudan - Sudan has acquired an unconfirmed number of the advanced Chinese WS-2 Multiple Rocket launcher In 2009.
- Thailand - WS-1B as DTI-1. Technology transfer, produce under license with Thai software.
- Turkey - TRG-300 Kasırga
- Morocco - 36 WS-2D launchers

== See also ==
- AR-1 - competitor to the WS-1
- A-100 - competitor to the WS-1
- WM-80 - competitor to the WS-1
- SY-400 - competitor to the WS-1
