= Executive Order 13959 =

2020 U.S. executive order regarding security investments

- Executive Order on Addressing the Threat from Securities Investments that Finance Communist Chinese Military Companies
- Type: Executive order
- Number: 13959
- President: Donald Trump
- Signed: November 12, 2020

Federal Register details
- Federal Register document number: 2020-25459
- Publication date: November 17, 2020
- Document citation: 85 FR 73185

Executive Order 13959 is a U.S. Presidential Executive Order signed on November 12, 2020, by President Donald Trump. Its title and stated goal are "Addressing the Threat From Securities Investments That Finance Communist Chinese Military Companies."

A related Executive Order 14032 ("Addressing the Threat From Securities Investments That Finance Certain Companies of the People's Republic of China") was signed by President Joe Biden on June 3, 2021. The national emergency declared by E.O. 13959 remains in effect and has been expanded by E.O. 14032.

== Prohibiting investment in "Communist Chinese military companies" ==
The executive order prohibits all U.S. investors (institutional and retail investors alike) from purchasing or investing in securities of companies identified by the U.S. government as "Communist Chinese military companies". A "Communist Chinese military company" is any company that the U.S. Department of Defense (DoD) has identified pursuant to Section 1237 of the National Defense Authorization Act for Fiscal Year 1999. The prohibition came into effect on January 11, 2021. On December 28, 2020, guidance on the executive order was published, clarifying that the order included subsidiaries of the relevant companies. On January 13, 2021, President Trump strengthened the executive order's requirements by issuing Executive Order 13974 ("Amending Executive Order 13959—Addressing the Threat From Securities Investments That Finance Communist Chinese Military Companies"), which mandated divestment by November 11, 2021.

== Section 1237 list of companies ==
Initially, the DoD identified 31 companies, including two companies whose shares were traded on U.S. exchanges. These include companies in aerospace, shipbuilding, construction, technology and communication industries.

- Aero Engine Corporation of China
- Aviation Industry Corporation of China
- China Academy of Launch Vehicle Technology
- China Aerospace Science and Technology Corporation
- China Aerospace Science and Industry Corporation
- China Communications Construction Company
- China Electronics Corporation
- China Electronics Technology Group
- China Mobile
- China National Chemical Corporation (ChemChina)
- China National Chemical Engineering
- China National Nuclear Corporation
- China Nuclear Engineering & Construction Corporation (CNECC)
- China General Nuclear Power Group
- China Railway Construction Corporation
- China Shipbuilding Industry Corporation
- China South Industries Group
- China Spacesat
- China State Construction Engineering
- China State Shipbuilding Corporation
- China Telecommunications Corporation (China Telecom)
- China Three Gorges Corporation
- China United Network Communications Group (China Unicom)
- CRRC Corporation
- Dawning Information Industry Co. (Sugon)
- Hikvision
- Huawei
- Inspur
- China North Industries Group Corporation (Norinco)
- Panda Electronics
- Sinochem

On December 3, 2020, the Department of Defense designated four additional companies as owned or controlled by the Chinese military, taking the total number of affected companies to 35.

- Semiconductor Manufacturing International Corporation (SMIC)
- China National Offshore Oil Corporation (CNOOC)
- China Construction Technology
- China International Engineering Consulting Corporation

On January 14, 2021, the Department of Defense designated nine additional companies as owned or controlled by the Chinese military, taking the total number of affected companies to 44.

- Advanced Micro-Fabrication Equipment
- Luokong Technology Corporation
- Luokong Technology Corporation
- Xiaomi Corporation
- Beijing Zhongguancun Development Investment Center
- GOWIN Semiconductor Corp
- Grand China Air Co. Ltd. (GCAC)
- Global Tone Communication Technology Co. Ltd. (GTCOM)
- China National Aviation Holding Co. Ltd. (CNAH)
- Commercial Aircraft Corporation of China, Ltd. (COMAC)

== Delistings ==
As a consequence of the executive order, the New York Stock Exchange in January ended trading of shares in China Mobile, China Telecom and China Unicom, and announced in late February that trading in CNOOC would also cease on March 9, 2021.

== Section 1260H list of companies ==
On June 28, 2021, the DoD published two notices in the Federal Register. The first notice removed the designation as Communist Chinese military companies under Section 1237 of the National Defense Authorization Act for Fiscal Year 1999. The second notice published DoD's first list under Section 1260H of the National Defense Authorization Act for Fiscal Year 2021, designating entities as "Chinese military companies" in accordance with the updated statutory definition. Since June 2021, the DoD has updated the 1260H list on an annual basis.

== See also ==
- Executive Order 14032
