= PHL-16 =

Chinese guided modular rocket launching system

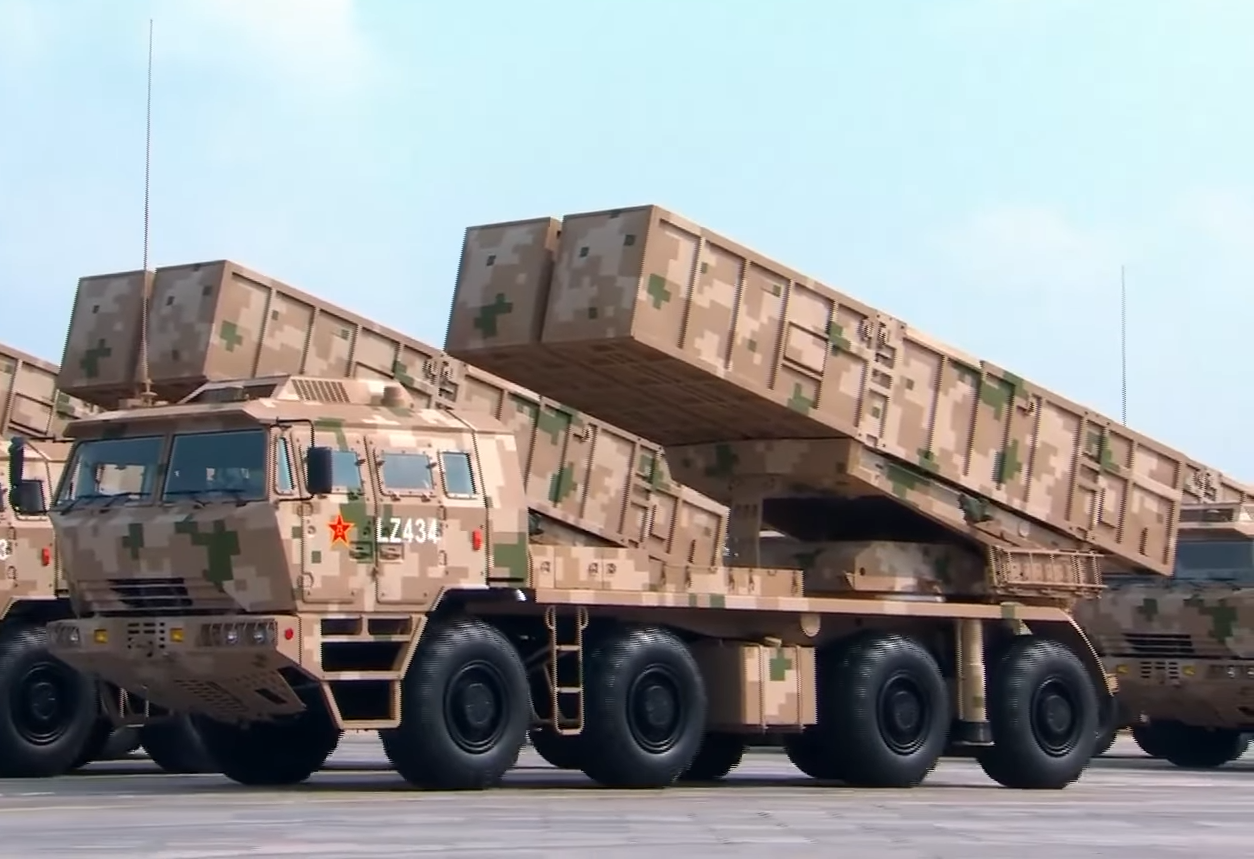
- PHL-16 with tactical ballistic missiles
- Type: Multiple rocket launcher
- Place of origin: China

Service history
- In service: 2019–present
- Used by: People's Liberation Army Ground Force

Specifications
- Mass: 45t
- Length: 12m
- Width: 3m
- Height: 3m
- Crew: 3
- Caliber: Depends on munitions: 300 mm (12 in); 370 mm (15 in); 750 mm (30 in)
- Barrels: Depends on munitions: 300 mm (12 in): 10; 370 mm (15 in): 8; 750 mm (30 in): 2
- Effective firing range: Depends on munitions: BRE3: 130 km (81 mi); BRE6: 220 km (140 mi); BRE8: 280 km (170 mi); FD480: 500 km (310 mi)
- Main armament: 2 modular launch cells, each can either carry: 1 × 750mm TBM or 4 × 370mm rocket or 5 × 300mm rocket
- Engine: Diesel, 8×8 wheeled

The PHL-16, also known as PCL-191 and PCH-191, is a truck-mounted self-propelled multiple rocket launcher (MRL) system developed by the People's Republic of China.

== Development ==
It is based on the AR-3 MRL developed by Norinco. The AR-3 was marketed in 2010. The PHL-16 was unveiled during the Chinese National Day Parade in 2019; unlike other rocket systems in the parade, the vehicles were unlabelled.

== Design ==
The launcher vehicles are operated in a firepower battery. The system is also capable of autonomous operation. A typical battery includes six launcher vehicles, several reloading vehicles, command post vehicle, a meteorological survey vehicle, and other service support vehicles.

=== Rockets ===
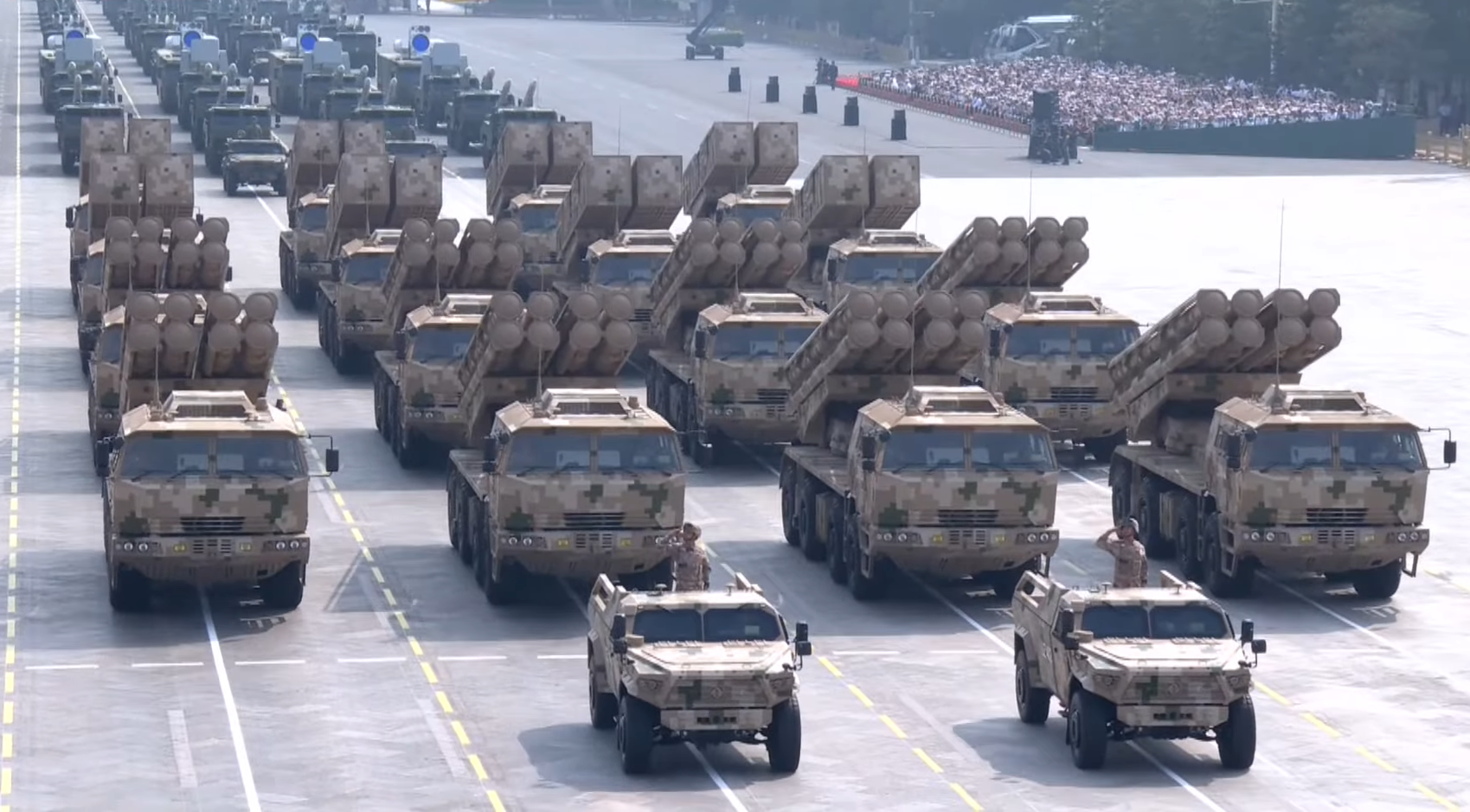
PHL-16s with eight guided rockets or two ballistic missiles

Unlike the earlier PHL-03, which is loaded with a fixed type of ammunition, the new PHL-16 has two modularized launch cells, which can carry different types of ammunition. Each launch cell can carry either five 300 mm (12 in) BRE3 rockets, or four 370 mm (15 in) BRE6 or BRE8 rockets. The export version of the new multiple rocket launcher, the AR-3, can switch to the 750 mm (30 in) Fire Dragon 480 tactical ballistic missile and 380 mm (15 in) TL-7B anti-ship missile. The domestic PHL-16 for the PLA service can also equip the same set of Fire Dragon and TL-7 ammunitions.

The configuration displayed during the 2019 National Day Parade was with eight 370 mm (15 in) rockets.

=== Chassis ===
The vehicle chassis is based on the 45 t (44 long tons; 50 short tons) WS2400 8×8 special wheeled vehicle chassis.

== Operational history ==
In February 2023, PHL-16 was observed to be deployed in the 73rd Group Army of the Eastern Theatre Command, which is responsible for the Taiwan Strait area. The Naval War College noted that the PHL-16 (PCL-191) is capable of providing precision strikes from 500 km (310 mi) away, allowing the PLA Ground Force to target ground forces, air defense, and coastal defense systems on the island of Taiwan with tactical missiles. The PHL-16 improved PLAGF's organic fire support capability.

In 2024, China inducted the Fire Dragon 480 missiles for the PLA.

== Variants ==
AR-3
Baseline; first marketed in 2010.
PHL-16
Development for the People's Liberation Army

== Operators ==
China

- People's Liberation Army Ground Force – 120+ units as of 2025.
