= Executive Order 14032 =

2021 United States executive order

- Addressing the Threat From Securities Investments That Finance Certain Companies of the People's Republic of China
- Executive Order 14032 in the Federal Register
- Type: Executive order
- Number: 14032
- President: Joe Biden
- Signed: June 3, 2021

Federal Register details
- Federal Register document number: 2021-12019
- Publication date: June 7, 2021
- Document citation: 86 FR 30145

Executive Order 14032, titled Addressing the Threat From Securities Investments That Finance Certain Companies of the People's Republic of China, was an executive order signed by United States president Joe Biden on June 3, 2021. The order came into effect on August 2, 2021.

The order expands the scope of the national emergency declared in Executive Order 13959 as means to deter American investors from investing in Chinese companies identified by the U.S. government as having ties to China's military or surveillance industry.

== Reactions ==
Wang Wenbin, the spokesman for the Ministry of Foreign Affairs of the People's Republic of China, responded by accusing the United States of "overextending the concept of national security" and "abusing its national power", and suggested China would retaliate. The Hang Seng Index dropped 1.1% following the announcement of the order.
