= Khaibar-1 =

Unguided artillery rocket made in Syria

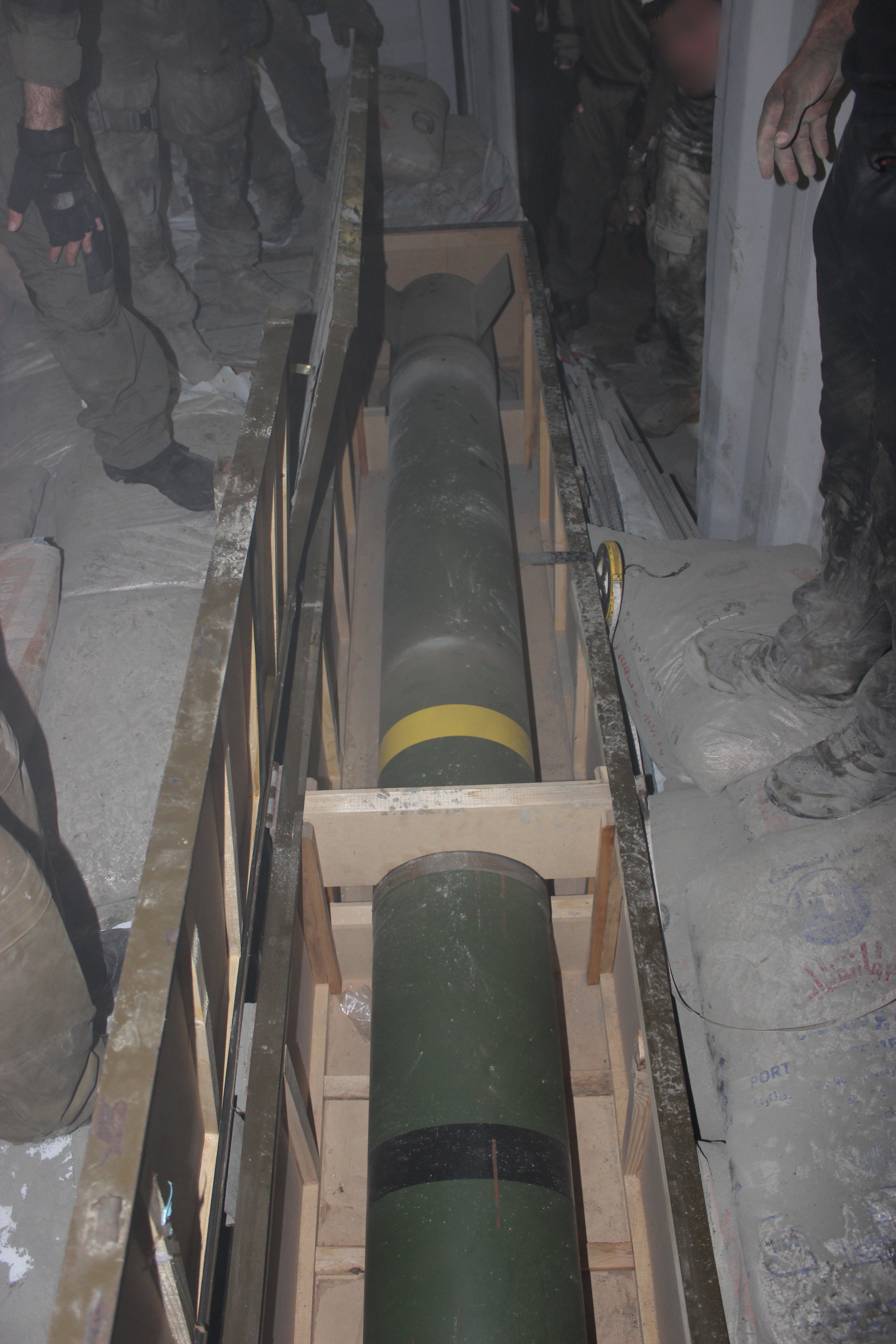
- Type: Rocket artillery
- Place of origin: Syria

Service history
- Used by: See § Operators
- Wars: 2006 Lebanon War; Syrian Civil War; Gaza war Israel–Hezbollah conflict (2023–present)

Production history
- Designer: Syrian Scientific Studies and Research Center (CERS)
- Variants: R-160 (Hamas variant)

Specifications
- Mass: 750 kg (launch weight)
- Length: 6.3 m (rocket)
- Width: 0.302 m (body diameter)
- Caliber: 302 mm
- Carriage: Unique Syrian-designed launcher
- Effective firing range: 100 km, 2014 M-302 150km
- Filling: Possibly cluster munition or fragmentation warhead

The Khaibar-1 (Arabic: خيبر-1), also known as the Khyber-1, M-302, B-302 and the R160 is a Syrian-made 302 mm unguided artillery rocket. It is best known for being used by Hezbollah against targets in northern Israel during the 2006 Lebanon War, and has also been used in the Syrian Civil War. It is a derivative of the Chinese WS-1 rocket.

The Khaibar-1 is significant because the rocket has a 100 km range, longer than the BM-21 Grad rockets that make up most of the Hezbollah rocket force. It uses a unique Syrian-designed launcher and possibly a cluster munition or fragmentation warhead. The rocket is easily recognizable by its fixed tail fins. In its M-302 incarnation, it is capable of 150km range.

The rocket is often misidentified as Iranian or as a variant of Iranian Fajr-3 or Fajr-5 rockets.

Hamas claims to be able to manufacture its own version of the M-302, named the R-160, named after one of its former leaders Abdel Aziz Al Rantisi.

== Characteristics ==
The Khaibar-1 is a rocket with a range capability of 100 kilometers when carrying a payload weighing 150 kilograms. This projectile is generally armed with large warheads designed for anti-personnel effects. It measures 6.3 meters in length, has a body diameter of 0.302 meters, and a launch weight of approximately 750 kilograms. The launch apparatus consists of a two-tiered structure, with each layer comprising three firing tubes. The Khaibar-1, while being unguided, boasts greater accuracy compared to the majority of locally produced rockets utilized by Hezbollah and Hamas. It also benefits from enhanced storage options due to its increased durability. Unlike the Fajr-5, the Khaibar-1 does not employ a spin mechanism during flight, which may affect its precision adversely.

Rockets fired by Hamas and other armed groups in the Gaza Strip were estimated to have a range up to 160 km (99 mi), giving them the capability of striking the city of Haifa.

== Origin of the name ==
Khaibar, also spelled Khaybar, is an oasis approximately 95 miles north of Medina, which was once the largest Jewish settlement in Arabia. The name was chosen as a reminder of the Battle of Khaybar, a battle that took place in 629 between Muhammad and his followers against the Jewish people who inhabited the settlement. The name of the rocket was first revealed on July 28, 2006 by Hezbollah leader Hassan Nasrallah in a speech on Al-Manar television station.

== Usage ==
The rocket's first use was being fired at the town of Afula during the 2006 Lebanon War. In early August 2006, Khaibar-1 rockets were reported to hit Beit Shean, about 70 km south of the Lebanese border, Hadera, and Haifa, Israel's third-largest city.

Iran has attempted to ship the Khaibar-1 rocket to Gaza as well. It was used by Hamas and other armed groups in the Gaza Strip for the first time in early July 2014.

A Khaibar-1 may have been used by Hezbollah on 15 March 2026 in a strike on central Israel, but other missiles or rockets cannot be ruled out.

== Operators ==
=== Current ===
- Syria

=== Non-state ===
- Hamas
- Hezbollah

== See also ==
- 2006 Lebanon War
- WS-1 on which the Khaibar-1 is based.
