= Norinco =

Chinese state-owned defense company

China North Industries Group Corporation

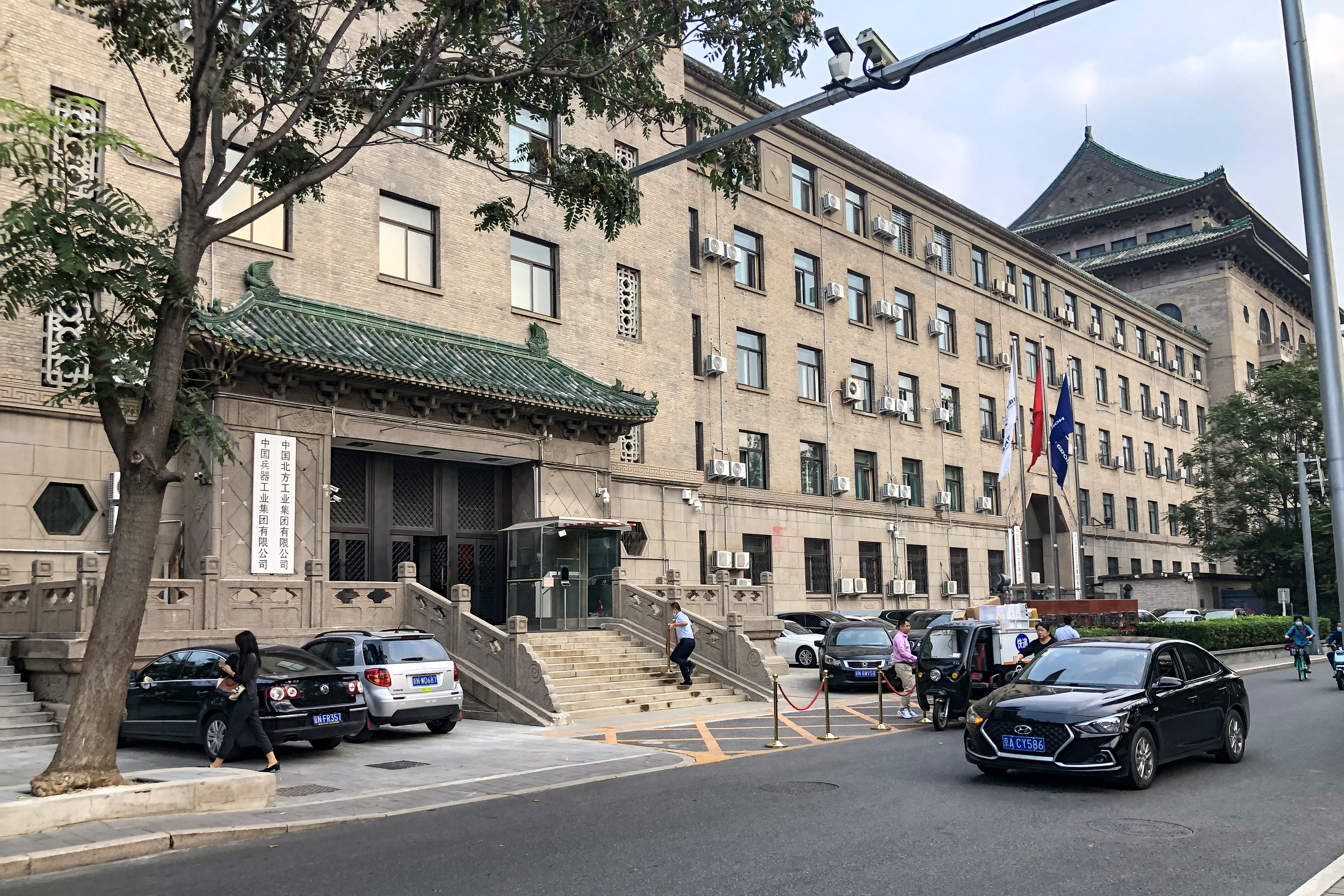
- Norinco Group Headquarters in 2020
- Trade name: Norinco Group
- Native name: 中国兵器工业集团有限公司
- Type: State-owned enterprise
- Traded as: SZSE: 000065 (A ordinary)
- Industry: Defense industry; Aerospace industry
- Founded: 1980
- Headquarters: Xicheng District, Beijing, China
- Area served: Worldwide
- Key people: Jiao Kaihe (Chairman); Liu Dashan (President)
- Products: Munitions (tank and artillery shells, firearms, grenade launchers, artillery, mortars, autocannons, rotary cannons, turrets, remote controlled weapon stations, CIWS, anti-aircraft cannons, explosives, missiles, cruise missiles, MLRSs); Combat vehicles, aircraft, unmanned aerial vehicles; Radars; Electro-optical devices
- Revenue: ▲US$82.6 billion (2023)
- Net income: ▲US$1.7 billion (2023)
- Number of employees: 216,339 (2023)
- Website: en.norincogroup.com.cn

China North Industries Group Corporation Limited
- Simplified Chinese: 中国北方工业集团有限公司
- Traditional Chinese: 中國北方工業集團有限公司
Transcriptions
Standard Mandarin
- Hanyu Pinyin: Zhōngguó Běifāng Gōngyè Jítuán Yǒuxiàn Gōngsī

China Ordnance Industries Group Corporation Limited
- Simplified Chinese: 中国兵器工业集团有限公司
- Traditional Chinese: 中國兵器工業集團有限公司
Transcriptions
Standard Mandarin
- Hanyu Pinyin: Zhōngguó Bīngqì Gōngyè Jítuán Yǒuxiàn Gōngsī

Norinco
- Simplified Chinese: 北方工业
- Traditional Chinese: 北方工業
Transcriptions
Standard Mandarin
- Hanyu Pinyin: Běifāng Gōngyè

China North Industries Group Corporation Limited, doing business internationally as Norinco Group (an abbreviation of "North Industries Corporation"), and known within China as China Ordnance Industries Group Corporation Limited (Chinese: 中国兵器工业集团有限公司), is a Chinese state-owned defense corporation that manufactures commercial and military products. Norinco Group is one of the world's largest defense contractors.

The company's subsidiary, China North Industries Corporation (Chinese: 中国北方工业有限公司), or simply Norinco, markets Norinco Group's products internationally, and is also involved in domestic civil construction and military defense projects.

Some of Norinco's international customers include Iran, Pakistan, Zimbabwe, Saudi Arabia and the Democratic Republic of the Congo, where it negotiated arms-for-minerals deals, as well as Venezuela.

== History ==
Established in 1980 with the approval of the State Council of the People's Republic of China, Norinco is an enterprise group engaged in both products and capital operation, integrated with research and development, manufacturing, marketing and services. Norinco mainly deals with defense products, petroleum and mineral resources development, international engineering contracting, optronic products, civilian explosives and chemical products, sporting arms and equipment, vehicles and logistics operation.

=== U.S. sanctions ===
In 1993, the import of most Norinco firearms and ammunition into the United States was blocked under new trade rules when China's permanent normal trade relations status was renewed. The prohibition did not apply to sporting shotguns or shotgun ammunition, however. In 1994, U.S. Customs agents conducted a sting operation named Operation Dragon Fire against Atlanta-based importers of Norinco firearms as well as Poly Technologies. Seven officials were arrested after agreeing to smuggle 2,000 fully automatic Chinese-made variants of AK-47s to undercover agents the officials believed may have been connected to the American Mafia. At least one official, Hammond Ku, attempted to sell Chinese-produced tanks and rocket launchers to the undercover agents.

In August 2003, the Bush administration imposed sanctions on Norinco for allegedly selling missile-related goods to Iran. These sanctions led to a prohibition on imports into the US of the remaining types of firearms and ammunition not covered by the 1993 ban.

In November 2020, Donald Trump issued an executive order prohibiting any American company or individual from owning shares in companies that the United States Department of Defense has listed as having links to the People's Liberation Army, which included Norinco Group. In June 2021, Joe Biden issued Executive Order 14032 expanding the scope of the national emergency declared in order 13959.

=== Russian invasion of Ukraine ===
In March 2023, Politico reported that Norinco shipped assault rifles, drone parts, and body armor to Russia between June and December 2022. Norinco is a major supplier of nitrocellulose, a key ingredient in gunpowder, for the Russian military.

=== Gaza war ===
Media reports indicate that Hamas have used thousands of Norinco-made assault rifles in the war.

=== Sudanese civil war (2023–present) ===
Norinco manufactured bombs have been used by the Rapid Support Forces in the Sudanese civil war.

== See also ==
- List of modern armament manufacturers
- China South Industries Group
