= 2023 People's Liberation Army Rocket Force corruption case =

Military corruption incidents in China

In 2023, a series of corruption cases in China involving the People's Liberation Army Rocket Force, the Equipment Development Department of the Central Military Commission, aerospace and military enterprises, and universities related to military research and development was uncovered. It was the first corruption case involving the highest level of the military after the 20th National Congress of the Chinese Communist Party and the start of Xi Jinping's third term as CCP general secretary and chairman of the Central Military Commission.

Starting in July 2023, a series of senior military and defense industry officials were dismissed from their posts. Some were removed from their positions as deputies to the National People's Congress and members of the National Committee of the Chinese People's Political Consultative Conference, while others were expelled from the Chinese Communist Party. Those involved included Li Shangfu, a member of the Central Military Commission, State Councilor, and Minister of National Defense, and all three former commanders of the Rocket Force: Li Yuchao, Zhou Yaning, and Wei Fenghe. The corruption of Li Shangfu and Wei Fenghe was first publicly confirmed on 27 June 2024, but the complete list of those involved and the specific details of the corruption cases were not disclosed.

== Predecessor purges and reforms ==
During Xi's initial anti-corruption campaign in 2013-15, the purge's primarily purpose was to remove generals loyal to Xi's political rivals and assert Xi's control over the PLA. As a result, most senior PLA leaders and operational commanders remained in their posts, despite their known complicity in corruption. The PLA retained much of its autonomy over military issues and maintained the existing political work system, meaning that the PLA was essentially monitoring itself.

Xi's 2016 military reforms aimed to strengthen military loyalty to the party, and added monitoring mechanisms that were supposed to deter corruption. However, these checks-and-balances still relied on PLA officers to monitor their peers, counting on political commissars to place party loyalty above else.

Despite the central government requiring official guidelines for “competitive selection”, China's defense industry is dominated by a handful of massive, state-protected monopolies that produce military equipment, where political patronage supersedes technical merit. Officers who were sent to the weapons manufacturers to ensure the quality of production have received bribes from such manufacturers. The PLA also classifies military procurement as a state secret and guards this secrecy obsessively. There is no public oversight nor independent auditing that serve as natural checks on corruption in democratic political systems, as the PLA instead relies upon internal policing even though that has failed for decades. As a result of the above institutionalized attributes, corruption remained rampant in the PLA.

== Effects of rampant corruption ==
It was widely reported that senior officers had paid for their promotions.

The ballistic missile's high prestige, large budget, and low chance of being launched for readiness verification makes the program a sweet spot for graft. Corruption during the procurement these nuclear systems "was so pervasive that some liquid-fueled missiles in the PLA Rocket Force were filled with water instead of fuel", while "massive new ICBM silo fields in Xinjiang had defective silo doors that would not open or function correctly". Chinese inter-continental ballistic missiles are rarely tested and only done so to gather data for new technologies, compared to American equivalents which are test-launched regularly to demonstrate effective deterrence.

Nan Tian, director of SIPRI's Military Expenditure and Arms Production Programme, said “a host of corruption allegations in Chinese arms procurement led to major arms contracts being postponed or canceled in 2024”, causing revenues from Chinese defense companies to drop.

== Investigations ==
=== People's Liberation Army ===
Military generals who were removed from their positions as deputies to the National People's Congress
Date	Name	Military rank	Branch	Reason	Notes	Ref.
7 July 2023	Zhang Zhenzhong	Former Deputy Chief of the Joint Staff Department of the Central Military Commission	Joint Staff Department	Suspected of serious violations of discipline and law		
26 September 2023	Lü Hong	Former Minister of the Equipment Department of the Rocket Force	Rocket Force	Suspected of serious violations of discipline and law		
26 September 2023	Li Yuchao	Former Commander of the Rocket Force	Rocket Force	Suspected of serious violations of discipline and law		
26 September 2023	Zhou Yaning	Former Commander of the Rocket Force	Rocket Force	Suspected of serious violations of discipline and law		
27 November 2023	Ju Xinchun	Former Deputy Commander of the Southern Theater Command and Commander of the Southern Theater Command Navy	Navy	Suspected of serious violations of discipline and law	Once served as the Minister of the Equipment Department of the South China Sea Fleet.	
28 November 2023	Zhang Yulin	Former Deputy Minister of the Equipment Development Department of the Central Military Commission	Equipment Development Department	Suspected of serious violations of discipline and law		
28 November 2023	Rao Wenmin	Former Deputy Minister of the Equipment Development Department of the Central Military Commission	Equipment Development Department	Suspected of serious violations of discipline and law		
4 December 2023	Ding Laihang	Former Air Force Commander	Air Force	Suspected of serious violations of discipline and law	In November, it was reported that he was under investigation for corruption related to the construction of the Beijing West Subuherbs Airport.	
5 December 2023	Li Chuangguang	Former Deputy Commander of the Rocket Force	Rocket Force	Suspected of serious violations of discipline and law		
27 February 2024	Li Zhizhong	Deputy Commander of the Central Theater Command	Ground Force	Suspected of serious violations of discipline and law	Once served as the Minister of the Army Equipment Department	
11 July 2024	Li Shangfu	Former member of the Central Military Commission and former Minister of National Defense		Suspected of serious violations of discipline and law	Once served as the Minister of the Equipment Development Department of the Central Military Commission.	

On 26 July 2023, the Equipment Development Department of the Central Military Commission issued an announcement to solicit clues about violations of military equipment procurement bidding since October 2017 and to carry out a rectification campaign against violations of equipment procurement bidding regulations. On 28 July, the South China Morning Post quoted sources as saying that the Central Military Commission Discipline Inspection Commission and the PLA's auditing department were investigating Rocket Force Commander Li Yuchao, Deputy Commander Liu Guangbin and former Deputy Commander Zhang Zhenzhong. It was said that the three had been taken away by investigators from the Central Military Commission's anti-corruption agency.

On July 31, the Central Military Commission held a ceremony to promote Rocket Force Commander Wang Houbin and Political Commissar Xu Xisheng to the rank of general. This indicates that the former Rocket Force Commander Li Yuchao and Political Commissar Xu Zhongbo have both been transferred from their original positions and replaced by Wang Houbin, the former Deputy Commander of the Navy, and Xu Xisheng, the former Deputy Political Commissar of the Southern Theater Command and Political Commissar of the Theater Air Force.

Li Shangfu served as Minister of Equipment Development of the Central Military Commission from 2017 to 2022, and later as a member of the Central Military Commission, State Councilor and Minister of National Defense. He has not attended any public events since attending the China-Africa Peace and Security Forum in Beijing on August 29. The Central Military Commission Discipline Inspection Commission filed a case against him on August 31, and he was removed from his positions as a member of the Central Military Commission, State Councilor and Minister of National Defense by the Standing Committee of the National People's Congress on October 24.

On 21 September, Wei Fenghe, the former commander of the Rocket Force, who later became a member of the Central Military Commission, State Councilor, and Minister of National Defense, was placed under investigation by the Central Military Commission Discipline Inspection Commission. On 28 September, Li Tongjian, a major general of the Rocket Force, was dismissed from his position as a representative of the Beijing Municipal People's Congress by the military representatives of the troops stationed in Beijing for suspected serious violations of discipline and job-related crimes. This information was disclosed in the print edition of the Beijing Daily on November 25.

On December 29, the Standing Committee of the National People's Congress confirmed the termination of the qualifications of the nine National People's Congress deputies, namely Zhang Zhenzhong, Zhang Yulin, Rao Wenmin, Ju Xinchun, Ding Laihang, Lü Hong, Li Yuchao, Li Chuangguang and Zhou Yaning, and announced it to the outside world. The Standing Committee also appointed Admiral Dong Jun, the former commander, as Minister of National Defense. This was the first time that the Chinese government disclosed information about the violations of discipline and law by the senior officers of the Rocket Force.

On 7 February 2024, Wei Fenghe, the retired former State Councilor and Minister of National Defense, was not included in the list of those who visited veteran comrades before the Spring Festival released by Xinhua News Agency. However, in April 2024, after the death of Uyunqimuge, the former Vice Chairman of the Standing Committee of the National People's Congress, Wei Fenghe, together with former State Councilors Dai Bingguo, Chang Wanquan, and Zhao Kezhi, sent a wreath. On 27 June 2024, Xi Jinping, General Secretary of the CCP Central Committee, chaired a meeting of the Politburo, which decided to expel Wei Fenghe and Li Shangfu from the Party and transfer their suspected crimes to the military procuratorate for review and prosecution. Previously, the Central Military Commission had expelled the two from the military and revoked their rank of general.

On 18 July 2024, the third plenary session of the 20th CCP Central Committee adopted the investigation report on the serious violations of discipline and law by Li Shangfu, Li Yuchao, and Sun Jinming, confirming the punishment of expulsion from the Party previously given to the three by the Politburo. On 11 October 2024, Xiao Longxu, chief engineer and researcher of the Rocket Force Research Institute, was removed from his position as a member of the 14th National Committee of the Chinese People's Political Consultative Conference. It is said that his removal was related to this case. His resume has been deleted from the official website of the Chinese Academy.

On 7 May 2026, Wei Fenghe and Li Shangfu was sentenced to death with a two-year reprieve, and no further commutation or parole will be allowed after their penalties are commuted to life imprisonment upon the expiration of the two-year reprieve period.

=== Military enterprises ===
On 13 December 2023, Guo Pingxiao, executive deputy director of the Science and Technology Committee of Beiben Heavy-Duty Truck Group, a subsidiary of China North Industries Group Corporation Limited (NORINCO), was investigated. On 27 December, the National Committee of the Chinese People's Political Consultative Conference (CPPCC) revoked the CPPCC membership of Wu Yansheng, Liu Shiquan, and Wang Changqing and requested the Fifth Standing Committee meeting to ratify the decision. Wu Yansheng is the chairman of China Aerospace Science and Technology Corporation ; Liu Shiquan is the chairman of China North Industries Group Corporation Limited (NORINCO ) and was formerly the general manager of China Aerospace Science and Industry Corporation Limited (CASIC); Wang Changqing is the vice general manager of CASIC and was formerly the vice president of the Third Research Institute (responsible for missile research and development) under the group.

On 29 January 2024, the National Committee of the CPPCC revoked Wang Xiaojun 's membership in the CPPCC and requested the Fifth Standing Committee meeting to ratify it. Wang Xiaojun was the president of the China Academy of Launch Vehicle Technology and the chief commander of the Long March 7 launch vehicle. The revocation of Wang Xiaojun's membership in the CPPCC was also considered to be related to the corruption case of the Rocket Force. On 4 February, Zhang Jianwu, former Party Secretary of the Changchun Equipment and Technology Research Institute of China North Industries Group Corporation Limited, was placed under investigation. On 5 February, Long Fei, a member of the Party Committee and head of the Discipline Inspection and Supervision Group of China Southern Power Grid, was suspected of serious violations of discipline and law and was under investigation. Long Fei previously served as the director of the General Manager's Office and secretary of the Party Committee of the General Office of China Aerospace Science and Industry Corporation. On 27 February, the Standing Committee of the Hubei Provincial People's Congress decided to accept the resignation of Feng Jiehong, former vice president of the Second Academy of China Aerospace Science and Industry Corporation, from his position as a representative to the 14th National People's Congress.

On 3 April, Li Zhaozhi, former minister of the Equipment Support Department of China North Industries Group Corporation Limited, was suspected of serious violations of discipline and law and is currently under investigation. On 7 April, He Wenzhong, vice president and member of the Party Committee of China Electronics Technology Group Corporation, was investigated. The Central Commission for Discipline Inspection announced that he "profited from the military industry." On 12 April, Yuan Jie, chairman and party secretary of China Aerospace Science and Industry Corporation, was removed from his post. On 26 April, the Standing Committee of the 14th National People's Congress issued Announcement No. 4, stating that Han Shuwang, Party Secretary and Chairman of Aerospace Investment Holding Co., Ltd., was suspected of serious violations of discipline and law, and his qualification as a representative to the 14th National People's Congress was terminated. The 8th meeting of the Standing Committee of the 14th Hebei Provincial People's Congress had previously decided on March 28 to remove Han Shuwang from his position as a representative to the 14th National People's Congress. There are reports that his downfall may be related to this case.

On 3 August, Zuo Zuqing, deputy director of the Capital Operation Center of China National Nuclear Corporation, was investigated for suspected serious violations of discipline and law. On 22 August, Dai Shoulun, secretary of the Mudanjiang Municipal Committee of the Chinese Communist Party in Heilongjiang Province, was investigated for suspected serious violations of discipline and law. Dai Shoulun had long served in the China Aerospace Science and Technology Corporation. On 30 August, Tan Ruisong, former Party Secretary and Chairman of the Aviation Industry Corporation of China (AVIC), was placed under investigation for suspected serious violations of discipline and law. On 27 November, Zhu Zhisong, secretary of the Pudong New Area Committee of Shanghai, was placed under investigation for suspected serious violations of discipline and law. Zhu Zhisong had worked for a long time in aerospace units in Shanghai.

On 10 January 2025, Zhang Kejian resigned from his positions as Vice Minister of the Ministry of Industry and Information Technology, Director of the China National Space Administration, and Director of the State Administration of Science, Technology and Industry for National Defense. Prior to this, he had missed many important meetings. From February to April, Jin Zhuanglong successively resigned as Secretary of the Party Group and Minister of the Ministry of Industry and Information Technology. Jin's main resume was in the aerospace system, and he had not appeared in public for a long time before being dismissed.

On 12 February, Liu Weidong, deputy general manager of China Ordnance Equipment Group Co., Ltd., was dismissed from his post. In March, Zhang Hongwen stepped down as a member of the Standing Committee of the Anhui Provincial Party Committee and Secretary of the Hefei Municipal Party Committee, at a young age of less than fifty. Zhang had previously served as Vice President of China Aerospace Science and Industry Corporation and President of the Third Academy.

On 28 October, the Standing Committee of the 14th National People's Congress issued Announcement No. 13, stating that the Standing Committee of the Hunan Provincial People's Congress decided to remove Xu Dazhe, the former secretary of the Hunan Provincial Party Committee, from his position as a deputy to the National People's Congress. Xu had previously served as general manager of China Aerospace Science and Industry Corporation, chairman of China Aerospace Science and Technology Corporation, vice minister of the Ministry of Industry and Information Technology, and director of the State Administration of Science, Technology and Industry for National Defense.

=== Military research and development universities ===
On 16 August 2024, the military procurement website under the Logistics Support Department of the Central Military Commission issued an announcement stating that Xi'an University of Technology was banned from participating in its procurement activities by the Rocket Force for "bid rigging" and Xi'an Jiaotong University and Southwest Jiaotong University were banned for "bid collusion". The ban will last until 16 August 2027.

== Official commentary ==
On 31 August 2023, Wu Qian, spokesperson for the Ministry of National Defense, said at a regular press conference when asked about the reorganization of the Rocket Force commander and the whereabouts of former Minister of National Defense Li Shangfu: "We will investigate every case and crack down on every corrupt official. The Chinese military governs itself according to law and has zero tolerance for corruption." This was the first time the Chinese military had mentioned anti-corruption efforts at the highest levels of the military since the case was reported. On 12 January 2024, the Central Military Commission Discipline Inspection Commission held an enlarged meeting to hear a work report from Zhang Shengmin, Secretary of the Central Military Commission Discipline Inspection Commission. He Weidong, Vice Chairman of the Central Military Commission, spoke at the meeting, saying that it is necessary to "manage and control the 'key few' with stricter standards and eliminate the industry's long-standing problems with a determination to get rid of them completely".

From 17 to 19 June 2024, Xi Jinping took the initiative to convene a meeting of the Political Work Committee of the Central Military Commission, pointing out that there are "deep-seated contradictions and problems" in the current political building of the military, and that it is necessary to eradicate the soil and conditions for corruption. All levels, especially senior cadres, should reflect deeply and make serious rectifications. On 27 June 2024, the Politburo reviewed and approved the Central Military Commission's "Report on the Results of the Investigation and Handling of the Li Shangfu Problem" and "Report on the Results of the Investigation and Handling of the Wei Fenghe Problem." The press release disclosed that the comments on the disciplinary investigations of the two individuals were:

	Li Shangfu	Wei Fenghe	Ref.
Serious violation of political discipline	Failure to fulfill the political responsibility of comprehensively and strictly governing the Party and resistance to organizational review		
Serious violation of organizational discipline	Violating regulations to seek personal or others' personnel benefits	Violating regulations to seek personnel benefits for others	
Economic crimes	N/A	Seriously violated the discipline of integrity by accepting gifts and money in violation of regulations.	
Economic crimes	He is suspected of bribery for abusing his position to seek benefits for others and accepting huge sums of money.		
Economic crimes	Offering money to others in order to obtain illicit gains constitutes suspected bribery.	N/A	
Other	The investigation also uncovered other clues to serious violations of discipline and law.		
Comments	Betraying one's original aspiration and mission, and losing one's Party principles	Faith collapses, loyalty is lost	
Comments	This has severely polluted the political environment and professional atmosphere in the military equipment sector.	Seriously polluting the political environment of the military	
Comments	His actions betrayed the trust and expectations of the Party Central Committee and the Central Military Commission. They caused immense damage to the Party's cause, national defense and military development, and the image of senior leading cadres. The nature of his actions was extremely serious, the impact was extremely negative, and the harm was exceptionally great.		

On 8 May 2026, the People's Liberation Army Daily posted an editorial which stated "The military wields the gun and there must be no one who harbours disloyalty to the party" and added "As senior party and military leaders, Wei and Li showed a collapse of faith and a loss of loyalty, betraying their original aspirations and missions and abandoning party principles". It added that Wei and Li had betrayed the trust and expectations of the CCP Central Committee and the Central Military Commission, "severely polluted the political environment of the military, and caused immense damage to the party’s cause, national defence, military construction and the image of senior leaders".
