= Li Jun (general, born 1963) =

- 李军

Chief of Staff of the People's Liberation Army Rocket Force
- In office December 2017 – April 2020
- Preceded by: Li Chuanguang
- Succeeded by: Li Yuchao

Personal details
- Born: September 1963 (age 62) Gong'an County, Hubei, China
- Party: Chinese Communist Party

Military service
- Allegiance: People's Republic of China
- Branch/service: People's Liberation Army Rocket Force
- Years of service: ?–present
- Rank: Lieutenant general

Chinese name
- Simplified Chinese: 李军
- Traditional Chinese: 李軍
Transcriptions
Standard Mandarin
- Hanyu Pinyin: Lǐ Jūn

Li Jun (Chinese: 刘军; born September 1963) is a lieutenant general in the People's Liberation Army of China who served as chief of staff of the People's Liberation Army Rocket Force from 2017 to 2020. He was a delegate to the 13th National People's Congress.

== Biography ==
Li was born in Gong'an County, Hubei, in September 1963.

Li served in the Second Artillery Corps (now People's Liberation Army Rocket Force) for a long time. He was promoted to commander of the 64th Rocket Base of the People's Liberation Army in December 2015. In December 2017, he was promoted again to chief of staff of the People's Liberation Army Rocket Force. In April 2020, he was commissioned as deputy commander, but having held the position for only eight months.

In December 2020, Li was chosen as deputy chief of staff of the Joint Staff Department of the Central Military Commission, and held that office until October 2020, when he was transferred to the Central Military Commission Joint Operations Command Center.

He attained the rank of major general (shaojiang) in 2010 and lieutenant general (zhongjiang) in June 2019.

Military offices
| Preceded by Li Chuanguang | Chief of Staff of the People's Liberation Army Rocket Force; 2017–2020 | Succeeded by Li Yuchao |
