= Li Chuanguang =

Chinese army officer (born 1961)

- 李传广

Personal details
- Born: 1961 (age 64–65) Qingzhou, Shandong, China
- Party: Chinese Communist Party

Military service
- Allegiance: People's Republic of China
- Branch/service: People's Liberation Army Ground Force
- Years of service: ?–present
- Rank: Lieutenant general

Chinese name
- Simplified Chinese: 李传广
- Traditional Chinese: 李傳廣
Transcriptions
Standard Mandarin
- Hanyu Pinyin: Lǐ Chuánguǎng

Li Chuanguang (Chinese: 李传广; born 1961) is a lieutenant general in the People's Liberation Army of China. He was a representative of the 19th National Congress of the Chinese Communist Party. He was a member of the 19th Central Committee of the Chinese Communist Party.

== Biography ==
Li was born in Qingzhou, Shandong, in 1961. He served in the PLA Second Artillery Corps for a long time.

In May 2016, he was promoted to become deputy commander of the People's Liberation Army Rocket Force, but having held the position for only two months. In August 2016, he became chief of staff of the force. In March 2018, he became deputy commander for the second time.

He was promoted to the rank of major general (shaojiang) in 2009 and lieutenant general (zhongjiang) in 2017.

On 29 December 2023, Li Chuangguang was removed from his position as a representative of the 14th National People's Congress.

Military offices
Preceded by Lu Fu'en	Deputy Commander of the People's Liberation Army Rocket Force; 2016	Succeeded by Zhang Zhenzhong
Preceded by Zhang Junxiang	Chief of Staff of the People's Liberation Army Rocket Force; 2016–2017	Succeeded by Li Jun
