= Yang Guoliang =

Chinese military personnel

- 杨国梁

Commander of the Second Artillery Corps
- In office November 1992 – January 2003
- Preceded by: Li Xuge
- Succeeded by: Jing Zhiyuan

Personal details
- Born: March 1938 (age 88) Zunhua County, Hebei, China
- Party: Chinese Communist Party
- Education: Beihang University; PLA National Defence University

Military service
- Allegiance: People's Republic of China
- Branch/service: People's Liberation Army Ground Force (1963–1985); Second Artillery Corps (1985–2003)
- Years of service: 1963–2003
- Rank: General
- Unit: Second Artillery Corps

Chinese name
- Simplified Chinese: 杨国梁
- Traditional Chinese: 楊國樑
Transcriptions
Standard Mandarin
- Hanyu Pinyin: Yáng Guóliáng

Yang Guoliang (Chinese: 杨国梁; born March 1938) is a general in the People's Liberation Army of China who served as commander of the Second Artillery Corps from 1992 to 2003.

He was an alternate member of the 12th and 13th Central Committee of the Chinese Communist Party and a member of the 14th and 15th Central Committee of the Chinese Communist Party. He was a member of the Standing Committee of the 10th National People's Congress.

== Biography ==
Yang was born in Zunhua County (now Zunhua), Hebei, in March 1938. He secondary studied at Changli No. 1 High School. In 1958, he entered Beihang University, majoring in the system design of missile.

He joined the Chinese Communist Party (CCP) in May 1961 and enlisted in the People's Liberation Army (PLA) in winter of 1963. He was assigned to the Jiuquan Satellite Launch Center in October 1964. In September 1983, he became deputy commander of the Taiyuan Satellite Launch Center, rising to commander in 1985. He served as deputy commander of the Second Artillery Corps in July 1985, and seven years later promoted to the commander position. In 2003, he took office as vice chairperson of the National People's Congress Foreign Affairs Committee, serving in the post until his retirement in 2008.

He was promoted to the rank of major general (shaojiang) in September 1988, lieutenant general (zhongjiang) in July 1993, and general (shangjiang) in March 1998.

Military offices
Preceded by Qiao Ping (乔平)	Commander of the Taiyuan Satellite Launch Center; 1985	Succeeded by ?
Preceded by Li Xuge	Commander of the Second Artillery Corps; 1992–2003	Succeeded by Jing Zhiyuan
