= Sun Jinming =

Chinese military officer (born 1965)

- 孙金明

Chief of Staff of the People's Liberation Army Rocket Force
- In office March 2022 – July 2024
- Preceded by: Li Yuchao

Personal details
- Born: March 1965 (age 61) Taizhou, Jiangsu, China
- Party: Chinese Communist Party (expelled in 2024)

Military service
- Allegiance: People's Republic of China
- Branch/service: People's Liberation Army Ground Force; People's Liberation Army Rocket Force
- Rank: Lieutenant general

Chinese name
- Simplified Chinese: 孙金明
- Traditional Chinese: 孫金明
Transcriptions
Standard Mandarin
- Hanyu Pinyin: Sūn Jīnmíng

Sun Jinming (Chinese: 孙金明; born March 1965) is a lieutenant general in the People's Liberation Army of China.

He was an alternate of the 20th Central Committee of the Chinese Communist Party.

== Biography ==
Sun was born in Taizhou, Jiangsu, in March 1965.

He was promoted to deputy commander of the 52th Base of the Second Artillery Force in 2015. In 2017, he was promoted again to commander the 69th Base of the Second Artillery Force. In 2018, he was appointed commander the 64th Base of the Second Artillery Force, he remained in that position until March 2022, when he was chosen as chief of staff of the People's Liberation Army Rocket Force.

He was promoted to the rank of major general (shaojiang) in August 2016 and lieutenant general (zhongjiang) in March 2022.

In July 2024, the 3rd Plenary Session of the 20th CCP Central Committee confirmed the decision to expel Sun.

Military offices
Preceded by Li Yuchao	Chief of Staff of the People's Liberation Army Rocket Force; 2022–2024	Succeeded by TBA
