= DF-26 =

Chinese nuclear and conventional intermediate-range ballistic missile

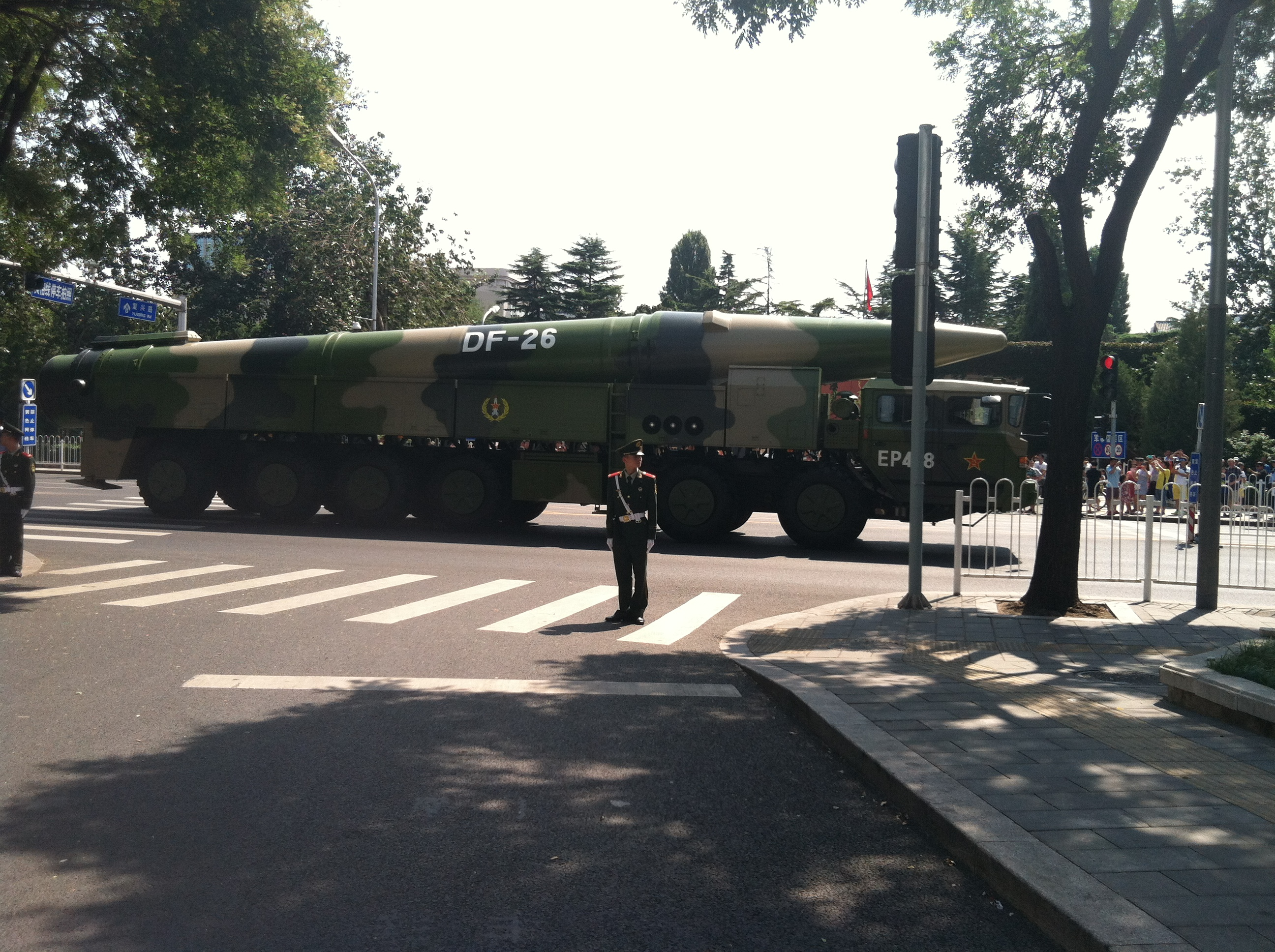
- DF-26 missile as seen after the military parade on September 3, 2015.
- Type: IRBM; ASBM
- Place of origin: China

Service history
- In service: 2016
- Used by: People's Liberation Army Rocket Force

Production history
- Manufacturer: China Aerospace Science and Technology Corporation

Specifications
- Warhead: 1,200–1,800 kg thermonuclear weapon Conventional
- Engine: Solid-fuel rocket
- Operational range: 5,000 km (3,100 mi)
- Accuracy: 100 m (330 ft) CEP
- Launch platform: Mobile launcher

The Dongfeng-26 or DF-26 (simplified Chinese: 东风-26; traditional Chinese: 東風-26; lit. 'East Wind-26'; NATO reporting name: CH-SS-18) is an intermediate-range ballistic missile of the Dongfeng series deployed by the People's Liberation Army Rocket Force and produced by the China Aerospace Science and Technology Corporation (CASC).

Chinese sources claim the DF-26 has a range of over 5,000 km (3,100 mi) and may conduct precision nuclear or conventional strikes against ground and naval targets. It is China's first conventionally-armed ballistic missile claimed to be capable of reaching Guam and the American military installations located there; this has led to the missile being referred to as the "Guam Express" or "Guam Killer".

The possibility that a DF-26 unit could have nuclear warheads makes it likely an adversary would target these missiles in a first strike. This weapon advances military goals from a brinkmanship policy to a calibrated escalation.

The missile was officially revealed at the 2015 China Victory Day Parade. In April 2018, it was officially confirmed that the DF-26 was in service with the People's Liberation Army Rocket Force (PLARF). The United States believes the missile was first fielded in 2016, with 16 operational launchers in 2017.

== Tests and deployments ==
On 26 August 2020, along with a DF-21D, a DF-26B was launched into an area of the South China Sea between Hainan and the Paracel Islands, one day after China said that an American U-2 spy plane entered a no-fly zone without its permission during a Chinese live-fire naval drill in the Bohai Sea off its north coast (the US confirmed a U-2 sortie but denied it was improper.) and came as Washington blacklisted 24 Chinese companies and targeted individuals it said were part of construction and military activities in the South China Sea. US officials subsequently claimed that the People's Liberation Army Rocket Force (PLARF) had fired four medium-range ballistic missiles in total. The missile tests drew criticism from Japan, the Pentagon and Taiwan and led to volatility in Asian markets. As of 2019, the DF-26 has not been tested against targets at sea.

A missile test range located in China's Taklamakan Desert is used for the development of the DF-26 anti-ship ballistic missile. The facility, which is a component of the People's Liberation Army's anti-access/area denial (A2/AD) strategy, includes full-scale mock-ups of U.S. naval assets, such as a Gerald R. Ford-class aircraft carrier, and Arleigh Burke-class destroyers . Some of these targets are mounted on rail systems to simulate movement. This test site is used to refine the DF-26's guidance systems and terminal-stage sensors, supporting its capability to engage and destroy naval vessels.

== Variants ==
- DF-26
- DF-26B
- DF-26D: a variant of DF-26. Unveiled on the 2025 China Victory Day Parade.

== See also ==
- Agni-IV – (India)
- DF-21 – (China)
- DF-27 – (China)
- RSD-10 Pioneer – (Soviet Union)

== Notes and references ==
=== General bibliography ===
- United States Department of Defense (May 2019). Annual Report to Congress: Military and Security Developments Involving the People's Republic of China 2019 (PDF) (Report). Archived from the original (PDF) on 9 May 2019.
- Wilson, Jordan (10 May 2016). China's Expanding Ability to Conduct Conventional Missile Strikes on Guam (PDF) (Report). United States-China Economic and Security Review Commission.
