= Wei Fenghe =

Chinese general and minister (born 1954)

- 魏凤和
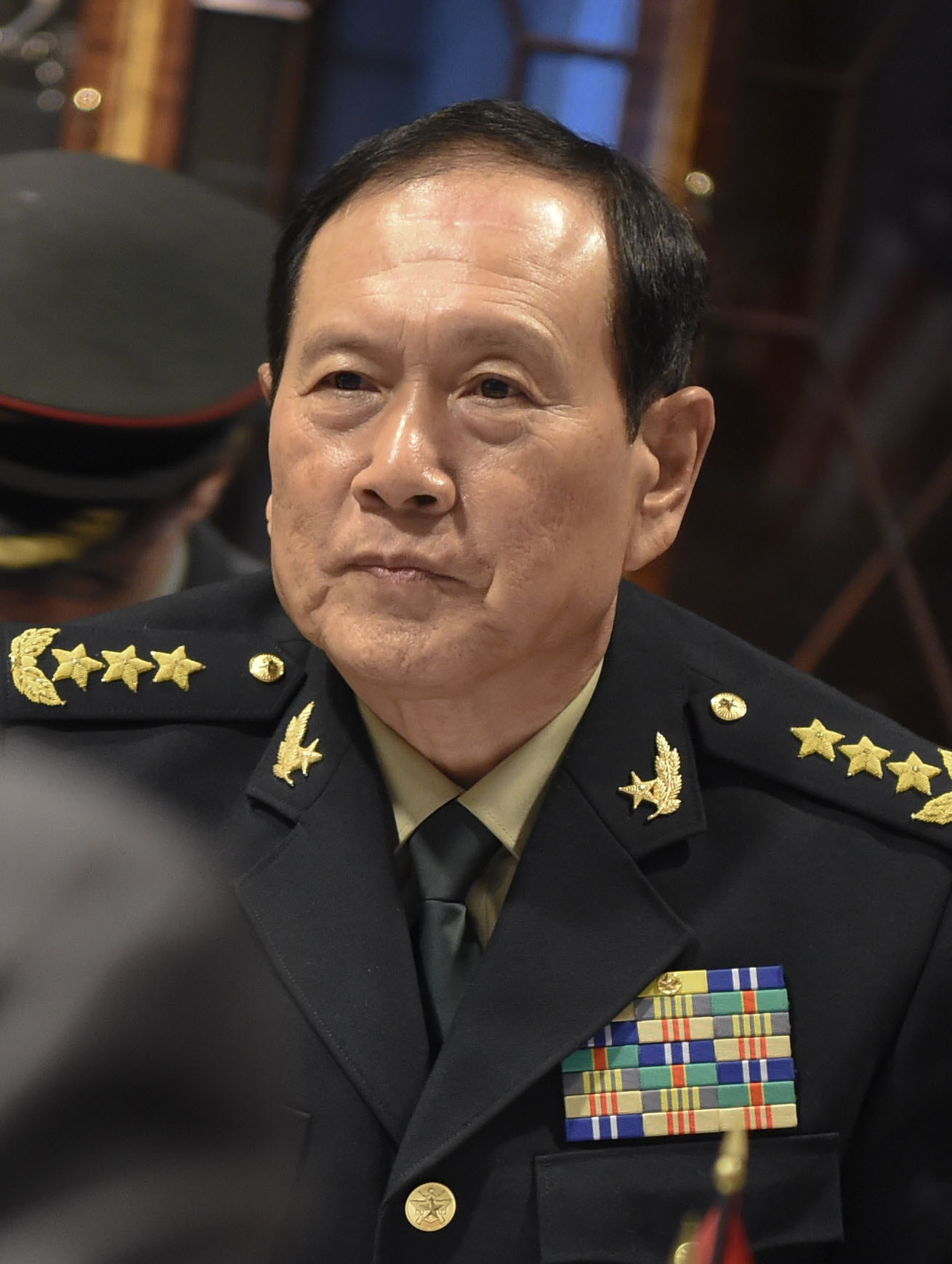

State Councilor of China
- In office 19 March 2018 – 11 March 2023
- Premier: Li Keqiang
- Preceded by: Chang Wanquan
- Succeeded by: Li Shangfu

12th Minister of National Defense
- In office 19 March 2018 – 12 March 2023
- Premier: Li Keqiang
- CMC Chairman: Xi Jinping
- Preceded by: Chang Wanquan
- Succeeded by: Li Shangfu

Commander of the People's Liberation Army Rocket Force
- In office October 2012 – September 2017
- Preceded by: Jing Zhiyuan (as Commander of the Second Artillery Corps）
- Succeeded by: Zhou Yaning

Personal details
- Born: February 1954 (age 72) Liaocheng, Shandong, China
- Party: Chinese Communist Party (1972–2024; expelled)
- Awards: Nishan-e-Imtiaz (Military)

Military service
- Allegiance: China
- Branch/service: PLA Rocket Force
- Years of service: 1970–2023
- Rank: General (stripped in 2024)
- Unit: Central Military Commission; State Council
- Commands: Ministry of National Defense (2018–2023); PLA Rocket Force (2015–2017); PLA Second Artillery Corps (2012–2015)

Chinese name
- Simplified Chinese: 魏凤和
- Traditional Chinese: 魏鳳和
Transcriptions
Standard Mandarin
- Hanyu Pinyin: Wèi Fènghé

Wei Fenghe (Chinese: 魏凤和; pinyin: Wèi Fènghé; born February 1954) is a former Chinese general (shang jiang) in the People's Liberation Army (PLA) who served as commander of the PLA Rocket Force, formerly known as the Second Artillery Corps. From 2018 to 2023, he was the Minister of National Defense, the first to have not come from the PLA Ground Forces and the first-ranked State Councilor from March 2018 to March 2023, and also the first-ranked ordinary Member of the Central Military Commission (CMC).

In September 2023, Wei was investigated by the CMC's disciplinary inspection department for charges of corruption. In June 2024, he was expelled from the Chinese Communist Party (CCP) and his case transferred to the military judiciary for criminal prosecution, and his rank of General in the Rocket Force revoked. In May 2026, Wei was sentenced to death with a two-year reprieve, which will be commuted to life imprisonment upon the expiration of the two-year reprieve period without the possibility of parole.

== Early life and career ==
Wei Fenghe was born in February 1954 in Liaocheng, Shandong. He joined the PLA and CCP in December 1970 and January 1972, respectively. Wei graduated from the PLA Second Artillery Command Academy's Command Department in 1984, and rose from the ranks of the Second Artillery Corps to the rank of general.

In October 2012, Wei replaced Jing Zhiyuan as commander of the Second Artillery Corps. In November, he was promoted to the rank of general. Prior to becoming commander of the Second Artillery, Wei served as the deputy chief of the PLA General Staff, a first for a Second Artillery officer. Wei also served as chief of staff of the Second Artillery, deputy chief of staff of the Second Artillery, 53rd Base commander, 54th Base chief of staff, and a variety of other command positions in the Second Artillery.

Wei was an alternate of the 17th CCP Central Committee, as well as a full member of the 18th and 19th CCP Central Committees.

=== Minister of National Defense ===
On March 19, 2018, Wei was appointed as the Minister of National Defense and the State Councilor.

On June 2, 2019, a few days before the 30th anniversary of the 1989 Tianamen Square crackdown, Wei defended the actions of the government in the 1989 events in Tiananmen Square and the handling of the protests by the government, saying the government "was decisive in stopping the turbulence".

On December 1, 2020, Wei was awarded the Nishan-e-Imtiaz for his services in promoting defense cooperation between Pakistan and China.

In June 2022, Wei warned that "if anyone dares to split Taiwan from China, the Chinese army will definitely not hesitate to start a war no matter the cost," adding that the People's Liberation Army "would have no choice but to fight … and crush any attempt of Taiwan independence, safeguarding national sovereignty and territorial integrity."

In March 2023, Wei retired from his position as State Councillor and Minister of National Defense at first session of the 2023 National People's Congress, and was succeeded by Li Shangfu.

== Downfall ==
On 31 August 2023, when a reporter asked Wu Qian, spokesperson of the Ministry of National Defense, about the whereabouts of Wei Fenghe, Wu stated that the Chinese military "will investigate every case and crack down on every corrupt official. The Chinese military governs according to the law, and shows zero tolerance of corruption." At the 74th National Day of China celebrations on September 23, Wei and Li Shangfu were absent from the event. Rumors regarding Wei's purge due to the ongoing corruption in the PLA's Rocket Force intensified after his name was not featured in Xinhua News Agency's article listing more than 130 senior Chinese politicians. In May 2024, at the funeral of former Vice Chairman of the Standing Committee of the National People's Congress Uyunqimg, a wreath under the name of Wei was present at the funeral, leading to assumptions that he escaped the ongoing anti-corruption purge within the Rocket Force. However, on 27 June 2024, the CCP Politburo announced that both Wei and Li Shangfu have been expelled from the party for "disciplinary and law violations", and their cases have been referred to the military's legal organisations for criminal prosecution, with Wei being accused of accepting unauthorised gifts and large amounts of money in exchange for using his power to obtain benefits for others. Both men were stripped of their rank of general. Some of the accusations made against Wei are unique to his case and are known for being used against high-level CCP members who had defected to the Kuomintang in the past.

On 7 May 2026, Wei was sentenced to death with a two-year reprieve over accepting bribes, and no further commutation or parole will be allowed after their penalties are commuted to life imprisonment upon the expiration of the two-year reprieve period. On 8 May 2026, the People's Liberation Army Daily posted an editorial which stated "The military wields the gun and there must be no one who harbours disloyalty to the party" and added "As senior party and military leaders, Wei and Li showed a collapse of faith and a loss of loyalty, betraying their original aspirations and missions and abandoning party principles". It added that Wei and Li had betrayed the trust and expectations of the CCP Central Committee and the Central Military Commission, "severely polluted the political environment of the military, and caused immense damage to the party’s cause, national defence, military construction and the image of senior leaders".

== See also ==
- 2022 Chinese military exercises around Taiwan

Government offices
Preceded by General Chang Wanquan	Minister of National Defense; 2018 – 2023	Succeeded by General Li Shangfu
