= Xu Xisheng =

Chinese general

- 徐西盛

Political Commissar of the People's Liberation Army Rocket Force
- Incumbent
- Assumed office July 2023
- Commander: Wang Houbin
- Preceded by: Xu Zhongbo

Deputy Political Commissar of the Southern Theater Command
- In office July 2017 – July 2023
- Political Commissar: Wei Liang; Wang Jianwu

Personal details
- Born: April 1964 (age 61–62) Xintai, Shandong, China
- Party: Chinese Communist Party

Military service
- Allegiance: People's Republic of China
- Branch/service: People's Liberation Army Rocket Force (2023–present); People's Liberation Army Air Force (until 2023)
- Rank: General

Xu Xisheng (Chinese: 徐西盛; pinyin: Xú Xīshèng; born April 1964) is a general in the People's Liberation Army of China, currently serving as political commissar of the People's Liberation Army Rocket Force.

He is a representative of the 20th National Congress of the Chinese Communist Party and a member of the 20th Central Committee of the Chinese Communist Party. He was a delegate to the 13th National People's Congress.

== Biography ==
Xu was born in Xintai County (now Xintai), Tai'an, Shandong province, in April 1964.

Xu once served as political commissar of the Fuzhou Command Post of the People's Liberation Army Air Force, director of the Political Department of the Beijing Military Region Air Force, and director of the Political Work Department of the Central Theater Command Air Force.

He was deputy political commissar of the Southern Theater Command in July 2017, in addition to serving as political commissar of the Southern Theater Command Air Force.

He attained the rank of lieutenant general (zhongjiang) in July 2018. He was promoted to general on 31 July 2023.

Military offices
Preceded by An Zhaoqing	Deputy Political Commissar of the Southern Theater Command; 2017–2023	Succeeded by TBA
Preceded by Xu Zhongbo	Political Commissar of the People's Liberation Army Rocket Force; 2023–present	Incumbent
