= Dongfeng (missile) =

Chinese strategic ballistic missile series

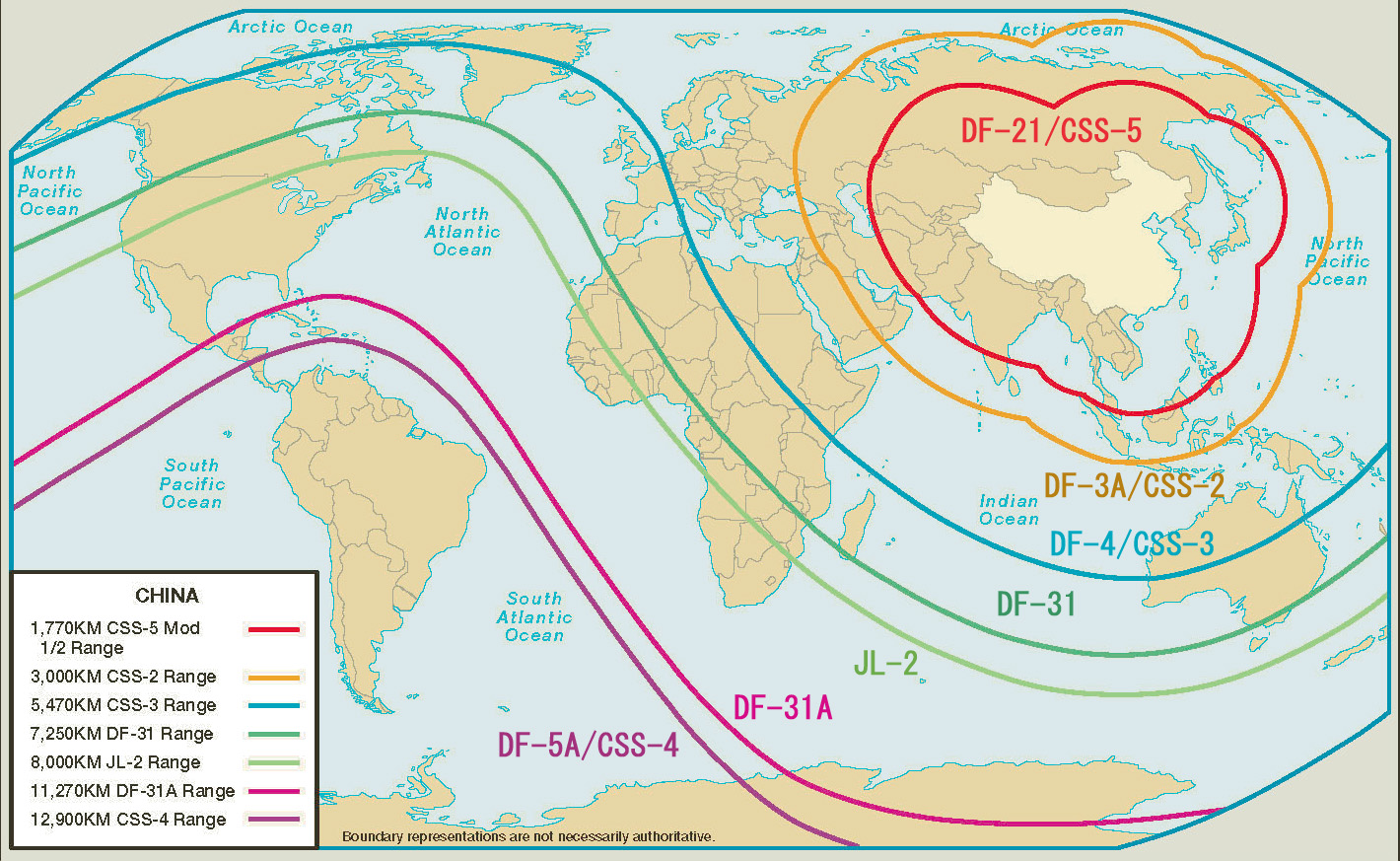
The range of China's medium and Intercontinental range ballistic missiles in 2007. Newer systems, such as the DF-31, DF-31A, and JL-2, will give China a more survivable nuclear force.

The Dongfeng (Chinese: 东风; lit. 'East Wind') series, typically abbreviated as "DF missiles", are a family of short, medium, intermediate-range and intercontinental ballistic missiles operated by the Chinese People's Liberation Army Rocket Force (formerly the Second Artillery Corps). Missiles of this series have consistently been the primary delivery method of China's nuclear weapons. The Long March family of space launch vehicles is also rooted in early Dongfeng development.

The DF-61 and DF-41 are examples of modern solid-fuel nuclear-armed ICBMs deployed by China. Conventional warheads are also used, including the DF-ZF hypersonic glide vehicle deployed on the DF-17, the dual-capable DF-26, and the DF-21, hailed as the world's first anti-ship ballistic missile.

== History ==
After the signing of the Sino-Soviet Treaty of Friendship, Alliance and Mutual Assistance in 1950, the Soviet Union assisted China's military R&D with training, technical documentation, manufacturing-equipment and licensed production of Soviet weapons. In the area of ballistic missiles, the Soviets transferred R-1 (SS-1), R-2 (SS-2) and R-11F technology to China. The PRC based its first ballistic missiles on Soviet designs. Since then, China has made many advances in its ballistic-missile and rocket technology. For instance, the space-launch Long March rockets have their roots in the Dongfeng missiles.

== Dongfeng missiles ==
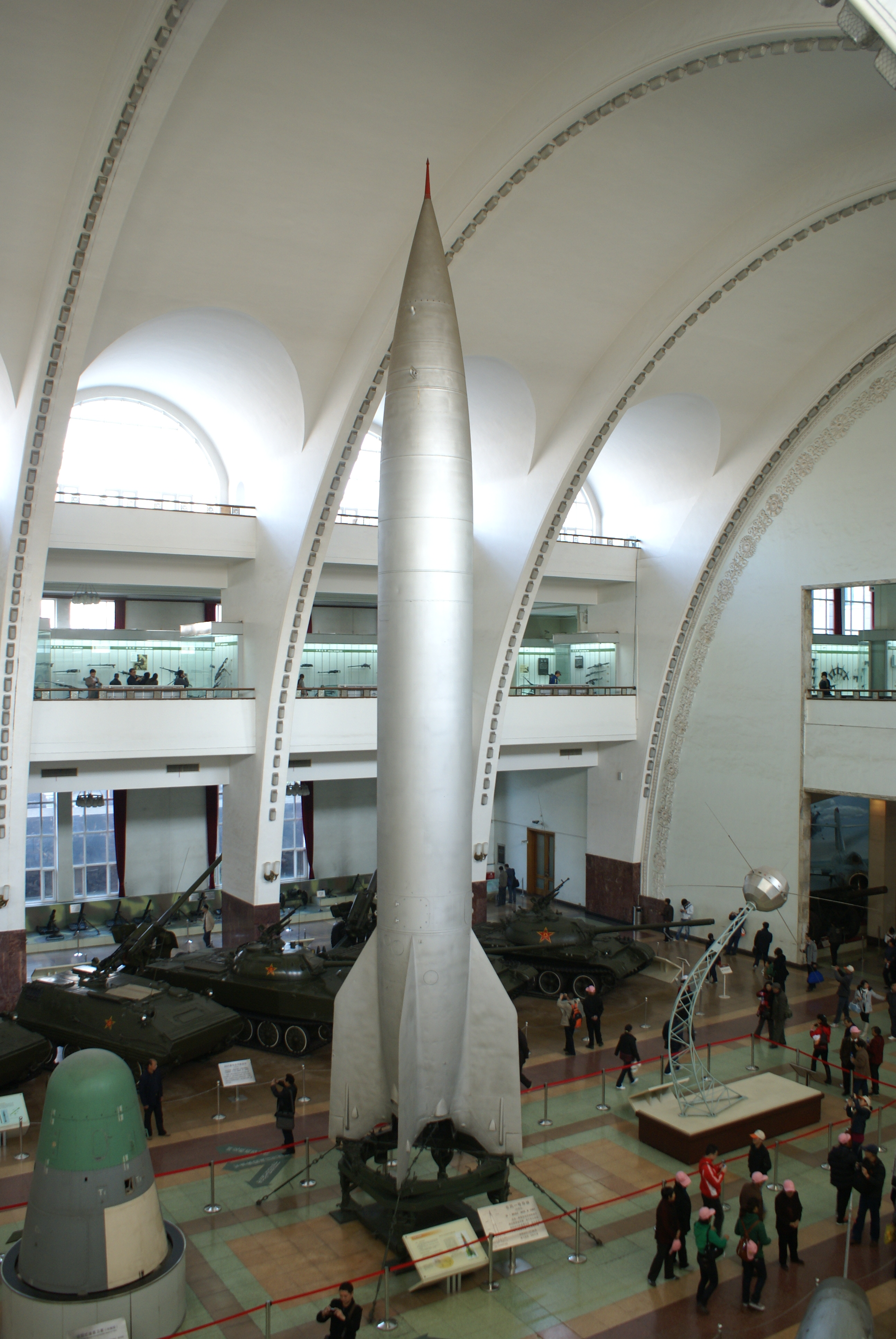
Dongfeng 1

=== Dongfeng 1 (SS-2) ===
The first of the Dongfeng missiles, the DF-1, was a licensed copy of the Soviet R-2 (SS-2 Sibling) short-range ballistic missile (SRBM), based on the German V-2 rocket.

In November 1960, the Chinese launched their first ballistic missile, which was a DF-1 fitted with a dummy warhead. Following the Sino-Soviet split, the Chinese used their existing missile production facilities to build an indigenous missile design, the DF-2.

=== Dongfeng 2 (CSS-1) ===
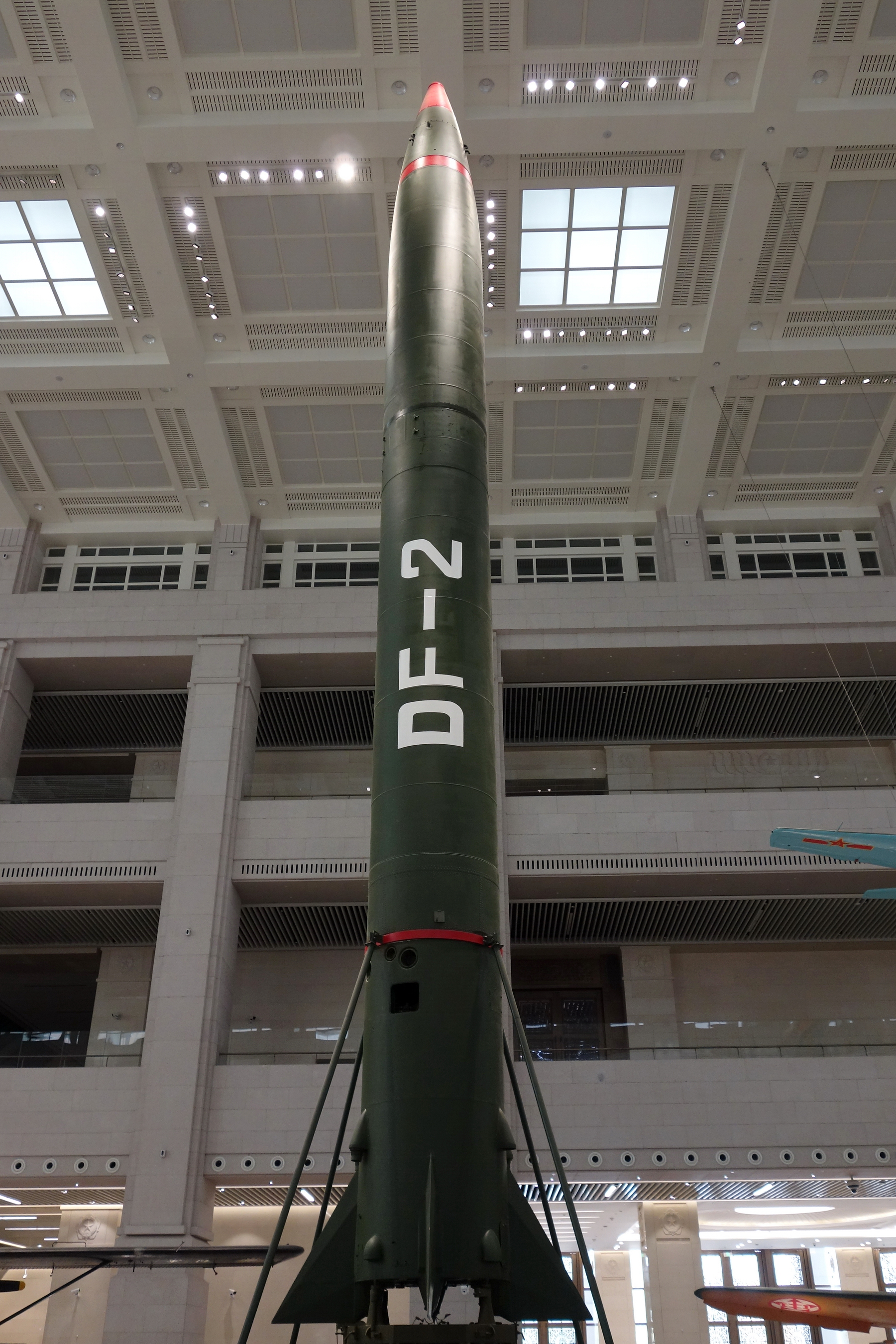
A Dongfeng 2 at the Beijing military museum

The DF-2 (CSS-1) is China's first medium-range ballistic missile (MRBM). It received the western designation of CSS-1 ("China Surface-to-Surface missile-1"). According to Lennox, it's "almost certain" that the Chinese had limited access to the R-5 Pobeda (SS-3 Shyster) missile before relations with the Soviet Union broke down, with some sources suggesting that the DF-2 combined the SS-3 airframe with a locally developed liquid oxygen and alcohol propulsion system based on the SS-2.

It was a single-stage liquid-fueled missile 20.6 m (68 ft) long with a diameter of 1.65 m (5 ft 5 in), four fins at the base, a 1,500 kg (3,300 lb) warhead with a blast yield of 15−20 kt, launch weight of 32,000 kg (71,000 lb), and presumably an inertial guidance system. The original DF-2 had a range of 1,050 km (650 mi), while the improved DF-2A had a range of 1,250 km (780 mi), allowing it to strike all United States military bases in Japan.

The first DF-2 failed in its launch test in 1962, leading to the improved DF-2A. The DF-2A was used to carry out China's test of a live warhead on a rocket on 27 October 1966, detonated in the atmosphere above Lop Nor. A drawback of the system was that the use of liquid oxygen prevented the missile from being kept stored fully fueled for long periods of time, which led to the development of newer missiles using storable propellants. About 100 missiles were produced until 1969. From 1966, 90 of these were deployed in Northern China, until they were taken out of service in the 1980s.

=== Dongfeng 3 (CSS-2) ===
The DF-3 (CSS-2) was the first Chinese ballistic missile to make use of storable propellants, allowing it to be kept stored fully fueled for long periods of time and launched at short notice. The common IRBM design was greatly influenced by the Soviet R-14 Chusovaya missile. The first stage engine was a direct copy of the С.2.1100/С.2.1150 La-350 booster engine developed by Aleksei Isaev at OKB-2 (NII-88). Design leadership has been attributed to both Tu Shou'e and Sun Jiadong.

The missile was produced at Factory 211 (Capital Astronautics Co., [首都航天机械公司], also known as Capital Machine Shop, [首都机械厂]). The 2,500 km DF-3 was originally designed with a 2,000 kg payload to carry an atomic, later thermonuclear warhead. A further improved DF-3A with 3,000 km range (~4,000 km with reduced payload) was developed in 1981, and exported to Saudi Arabia with a conventional high-explosive warhead.

The DF-3's range of 2,810 km means it is just short of being able to target Guam. The 2012 DOD report on China's military power states that they have a range of 3,300 km, which would be enough to target Guam. The 2013 Pentagon report on China's military power confirms the DF-3's 3,300 km range, and its maps show Guam being within the DF-3's range. All DF-3/DF-3A's were retired by the mid-2010s and replaced by the DF-21.

=== Dongfeng 4 (CSS-3) ===
The DF-4 (CSS-3) "Chingyu" is China's first two-stage ballistic missile, with 5,550-7,000 km range and 2,200 kg payload (3 Mt nuclear warhead). It was developed in late 1960s to provide strike capability against Moscow and Guam. The DF-4 missile also served as basis for China's first space launch vehicle, Chang Zheng 1 (Long March 1). Approx. 20 DF-4's remain in service, and are scheduled to be replaced by DF-31 by 2010–2015.

=== Dongfeng 5 (CSS-4) ===
The DF-5 (CSS-4) is an intercontinental ballistic missile (ICBM), designed to carry a 3 megaton (Mt) nuclear warhead to distance up to 12,000 km. The DF-5 is a silo-based, two-stage missile, and its rocket served as the basis for the space-launch vehicle Fengbao-Tempest (FB-1) used to launch satellites. The missile was developed in the 1960s, and entered service in 1981. In the mid 1990s, an improved variant, the DF-5A, was produced with improved range (>13,000 km).

Currently, an estimated 24-36 DF-5A's are in service as China's primary ICBM force. If the DF-5A is launched from the eastern part of the Qinghai province, it can reach cities like Los Angeles, Sacramento and San Francisco. If it is launched from the most eastern parts of northeastern provinces, it can cover all of the mainland of the United States.

=== Dongfeng 11 (CSS-7) ===
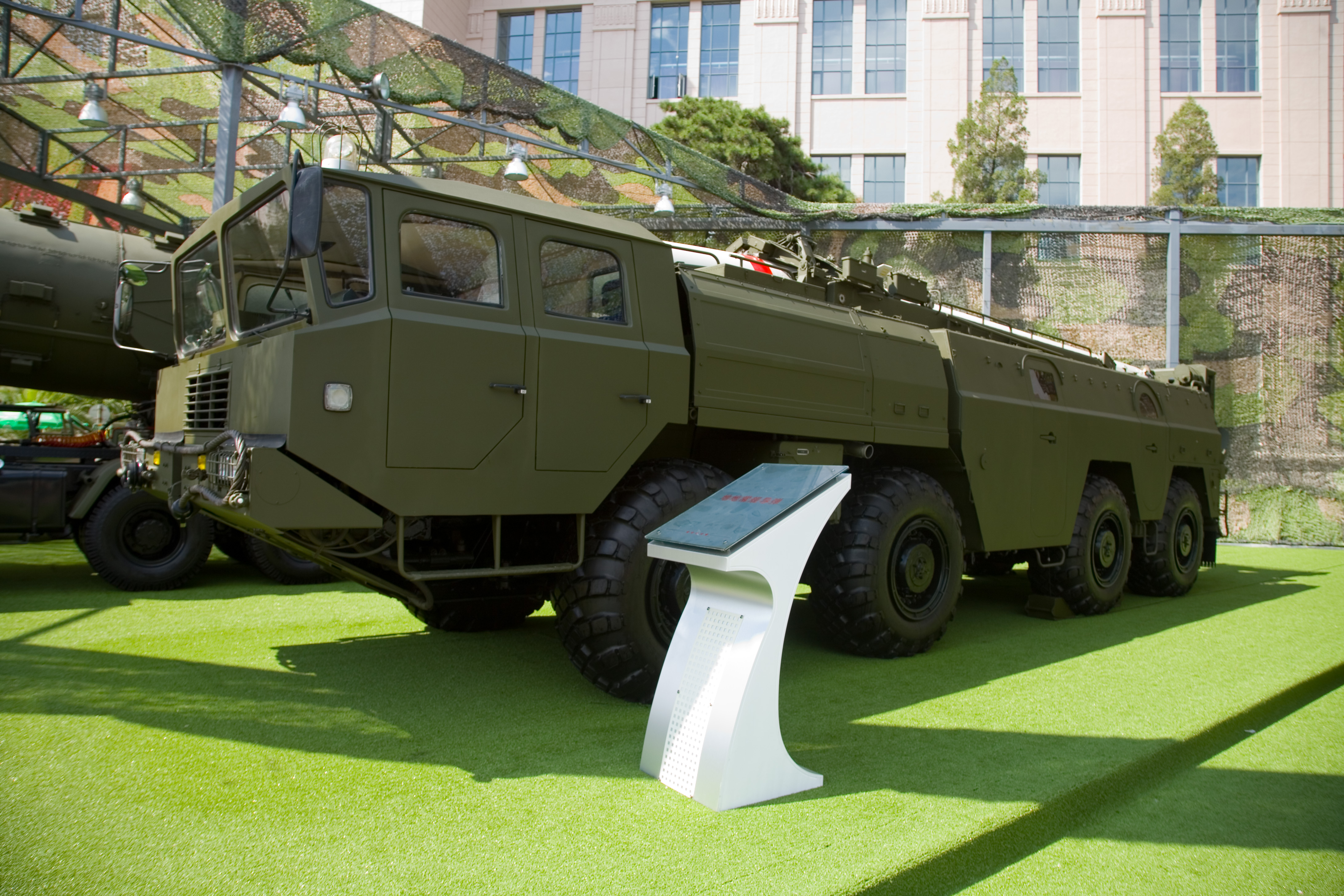
A DF-11 TEL.

The DF-11 (CSS-7, also M-11 for export), is a road-mobile SRBM designed by Wang Zhenhua at the Sanjiang Missile Corporation (also known as the 066 Base) in the late 1970s. Unlike previous Chinese ballistic missiles, the DF-11 use solid fuel, which greatly reduces launch preparation time to around 15–30 minutes, while liquid-fuelled missiles such as the DF-5 require up to 2 hours of pre-launch preparation. The DF-11 has a range of 300 km and an 800 kg payload. An improved DF-11A version has increased range of >825 km. The range of the M-11 does not violate the limits set by the Missile Technology Control Regime (MTCR). Estimates on the number of DF-11s in service vary between 500 and 600.

=== Dongfeng 12 (CSS-X-15) ===
3D rendering of DF-12/M20 tactical ballistic missile system

The DF-12 (CSS-X-15) is an SRBM formerly known as the M20. The change in designation signalled a shift in fielding to the Second Artillery Corps, making it possible the missile could be armed with a tactical nuclear warhead. Images of it bear a resemblance to the Russian 9K720 Iskander missile which, although not purchased by China from Russia, could have been acquired from former Soviet states. Like the Iskander, the DF-12 reportedly has built-in countermeasures including terminal maneuverability to survive against missile defense systems.

Its range is officially between 100–280 km (62–174 mi), but given MTCR restrictions, actual maximum range may be up to 400–420 km (250–260 mi). With guidance provided by inertial navigation and Beidou, accuracy is 30 meters CEP; since the missile is controlled throughout the entire flight path, it can be re-targeted mid-flight. The DF-12 is 7.815 m (25.64 ft) long, 0.75 m (2.5 ft) in diameter, has a take-off weight of 4,010 kg (8,840 lb), and an 880 lb (400 kg) warhead that can deliver cluster, high explosive fragmentation, penetration, or high-explosive incendiary payloads. They are fired from an 8×8 transporter erector launcher (TEL) that holds two missiles.

An anti-ship ballistic missile export variant of the M20, called A/MGG-20B (M20B), was unveiled at the 2018 Zhuhai Airshow.

=== Dongfeng 15 (CSS-6) ===
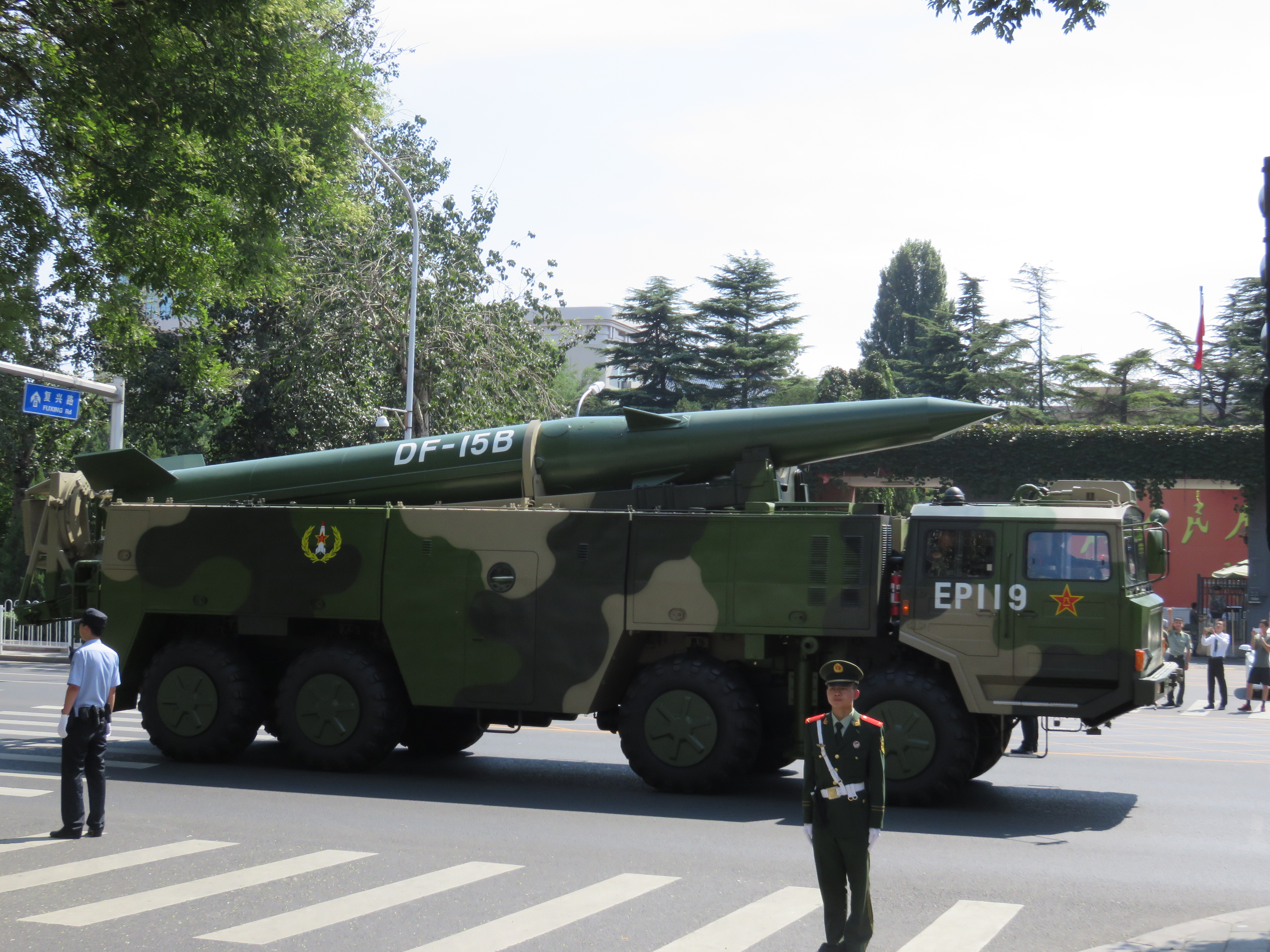
DF-15

The DF-15 (CSS-6, also M-9 for export) was developed by the China Aerospace Science and Technology Corporation (CASC, previously known as the 5th Aerospace Academy)'s Academy of Rocket Motor Technology (ARMT, also known as the 4th Academy). The missile is a single-stage, solid-fuel SRBM with a 600 km range and a 500 kg payload. During the 1995-1996 Taiwan strait crisis, the PLA launched six DF-15's near Taiwan in a demonstration of the missile's capability. Although the DF-15 is marketed for export, its range would violate the Missile Technology Control Regime (MTCR) agreement. In September 2026, Saudi Arabia appeared to have launched a DF-15 in strikes against Houthi militants in Yemen. Approximately 300-350 DF-15's are in service with the PLA Rocket Force.

=== Dongfeng 16 (CSS-11) ===
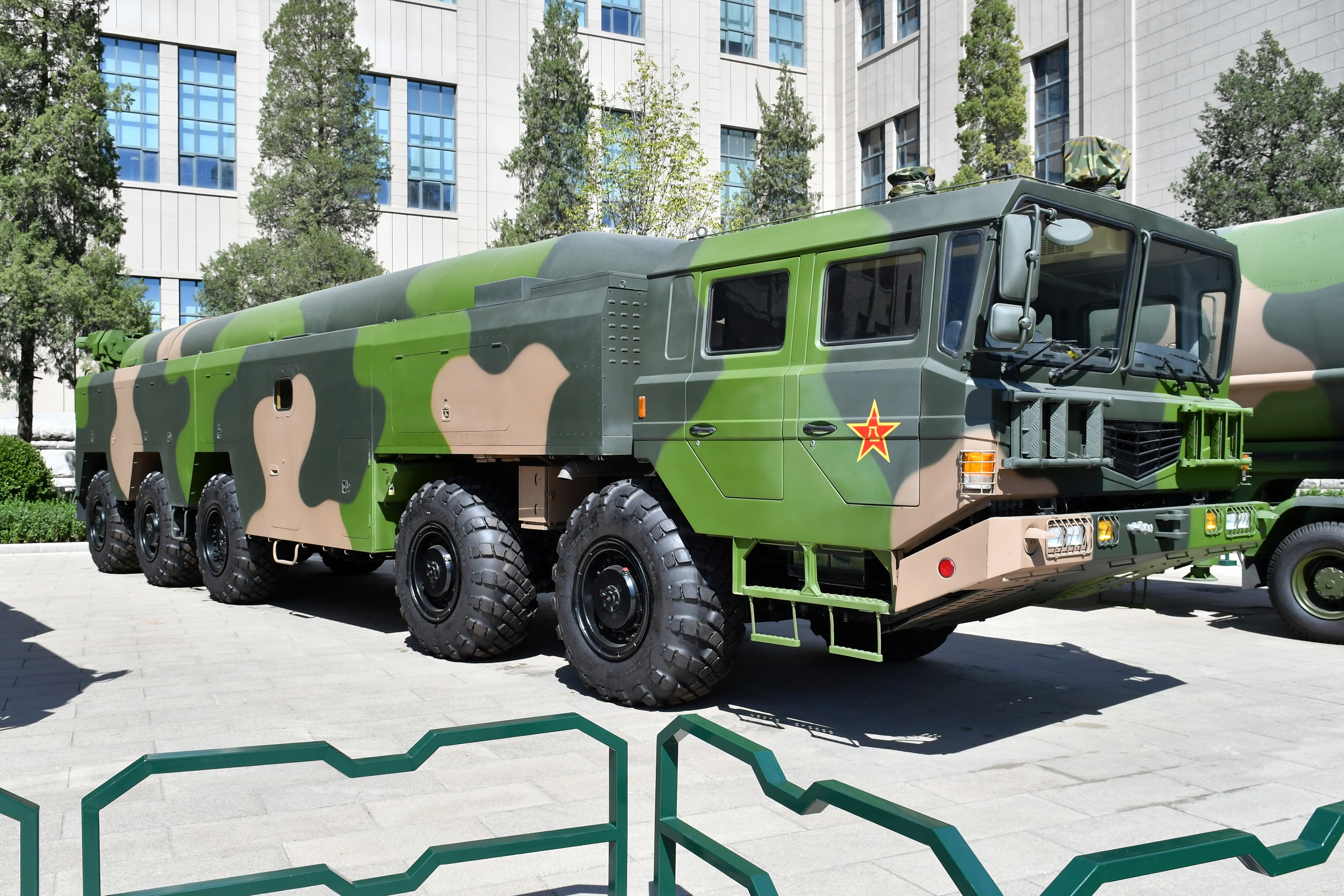
DF-16 as seen after the 2015 Beijing military parade.

The DF-16 (CSS-11) is a new-model missile that has a longer range than the DF-15, between 800–1,000 km (500–620 mi). In March 2011, Taiwan believed that China had begun deploying the missiles. The DF-16 represents an increased threat to Taiwan because it is more difficult to intercept for anti-ballistic missiles systems such as the MIM-104 Patriot PAC-3. Due to its increased range, the missile has to climb to higher altitudes before descending, giving more time for gravity to accelerate it on re-entry, faster than a PAC-3 could effectively engage it.

The DF-16 is an MRBM longer and wider than previous models with a 1,000–1,500 kg (2,200–3,300 lb) warhead and 5-10 meter accuracy. Its bi-conic warhead structure leaves room for potential growth to include specialized terminally guided and deep penetrating warheads. It is launched from a 10×10 wheeled TEL similar to that of the DF-21, but instead of a "cold launch" missile storage tube it uses a new protective "shell" to cover the missile. It is also capable of carrying a nuclear warhead.

The missile was shown to the public during the 2015 China Victory Day Parade in Beijing.

=== Dongfeng 17 ===
The DF-17 is a medium-range ballistic missile used to launch the DF-ZF hypersonic glide vehicle. The DF-ZF is a conventional warhead, although US intelligence considers it to be nuclear capable. The system entered service in the second half of 2019.

=== Dongfeng 21 (CSS-5) ===
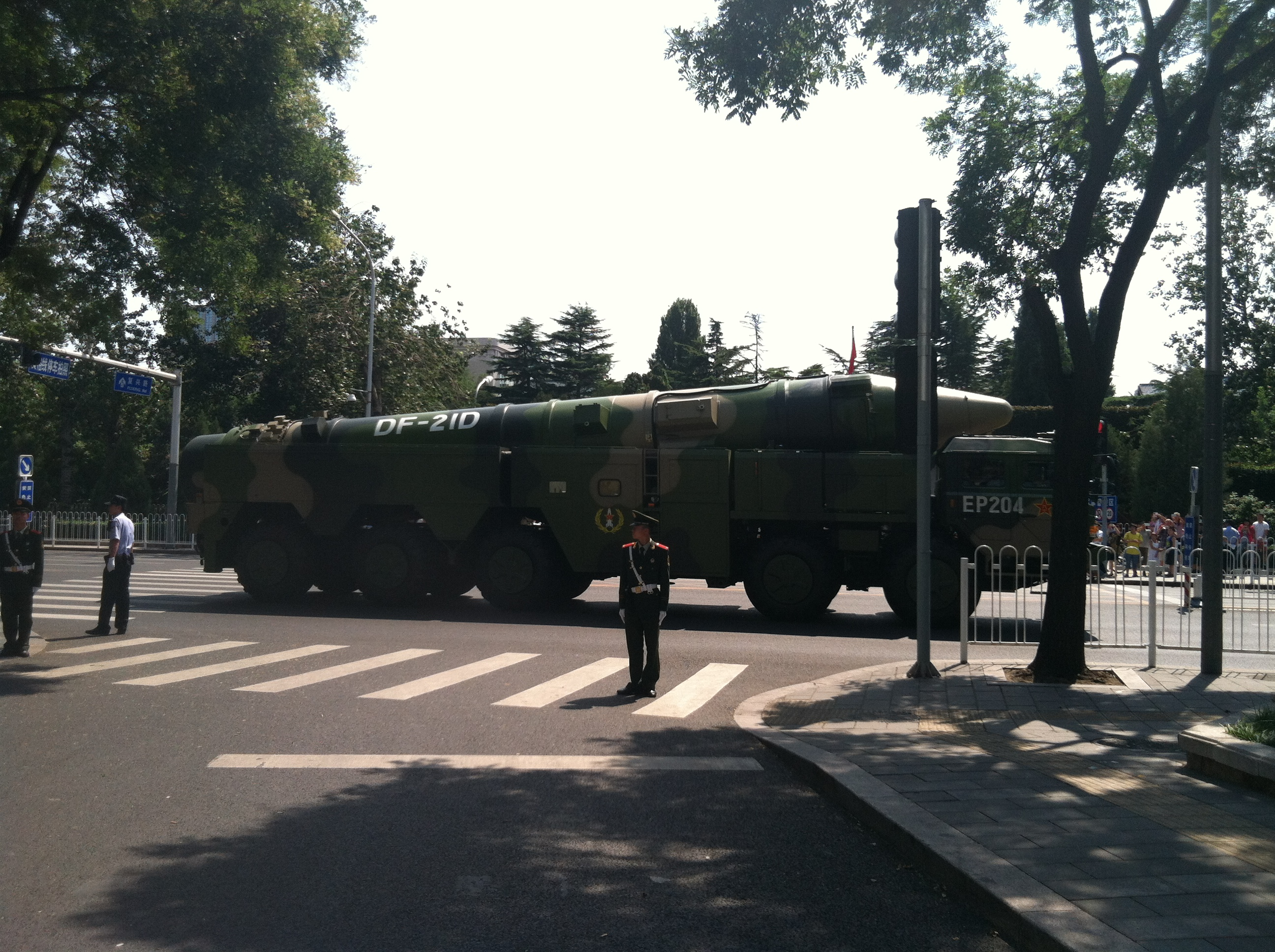
A DF-21D after the 2015 Beijing military parade.

The DF-21 (CSS-5) is a two-stage, solid-fuel MRBM developed by the 2nd Aerospace Academy (now China Changfeng Mechanics and Electronics Technology Academy) in the late 1970s. It was the first solid-fuelled ballistic missile deployed by the Second Artillery Corp. The missile carries a single 500 kt nuclear warhead, with up to 2,500 km (1,600 mi) range. The DF-21 also served as the basis for the submarine-launched ballistic missile (SLBM) JL-1 (CSS-N-3), used on the Xia-class SSBN.

In 1996, an improved variant, the DF-21A, was introduced. In 2010, 60-80 DF-21/DF-21A were estimated to be in service. This number may have increased since then. Sources say Saudi Arabia bought a DF-21 in 2007.

The latest variant, the DF-21D, has a maximum range exceeding 1,450 kilometres (900 mi; 780 nmi) according to the U.S. National Air and Space Intelligence Center. It is hailed as the world's first anti-ship ballistic missile (ASBM) system, capable of targeting a moving carrier strike group from long-range, land-based mobile launchers. The DF-21D is thought to employ maneuverable reentry vehicles (MaRVs) with a terminal guidance system. It may have been tested in 2005–2006. The launch of the Jianbing-5/YaoGan-1 and Jianbing-6/YaoGan-2 satellites offering targeting information from synthetic aperture radar (SAR) and visual imaging, respectively.

=== Dongfeng 25 ===
The DF-25 was a mobile-launch, two-stage, solid-fuel IRBM with a range of 3,200 kilometres (2,000 mi). Development was allegedly cancelled in 1996. The U.S. Department of Defense in its 2013 report to Congress on China's military developments made no mention of the DF-25 as a missile in service.

=== Dongfeng 26 (CSS-18) ===
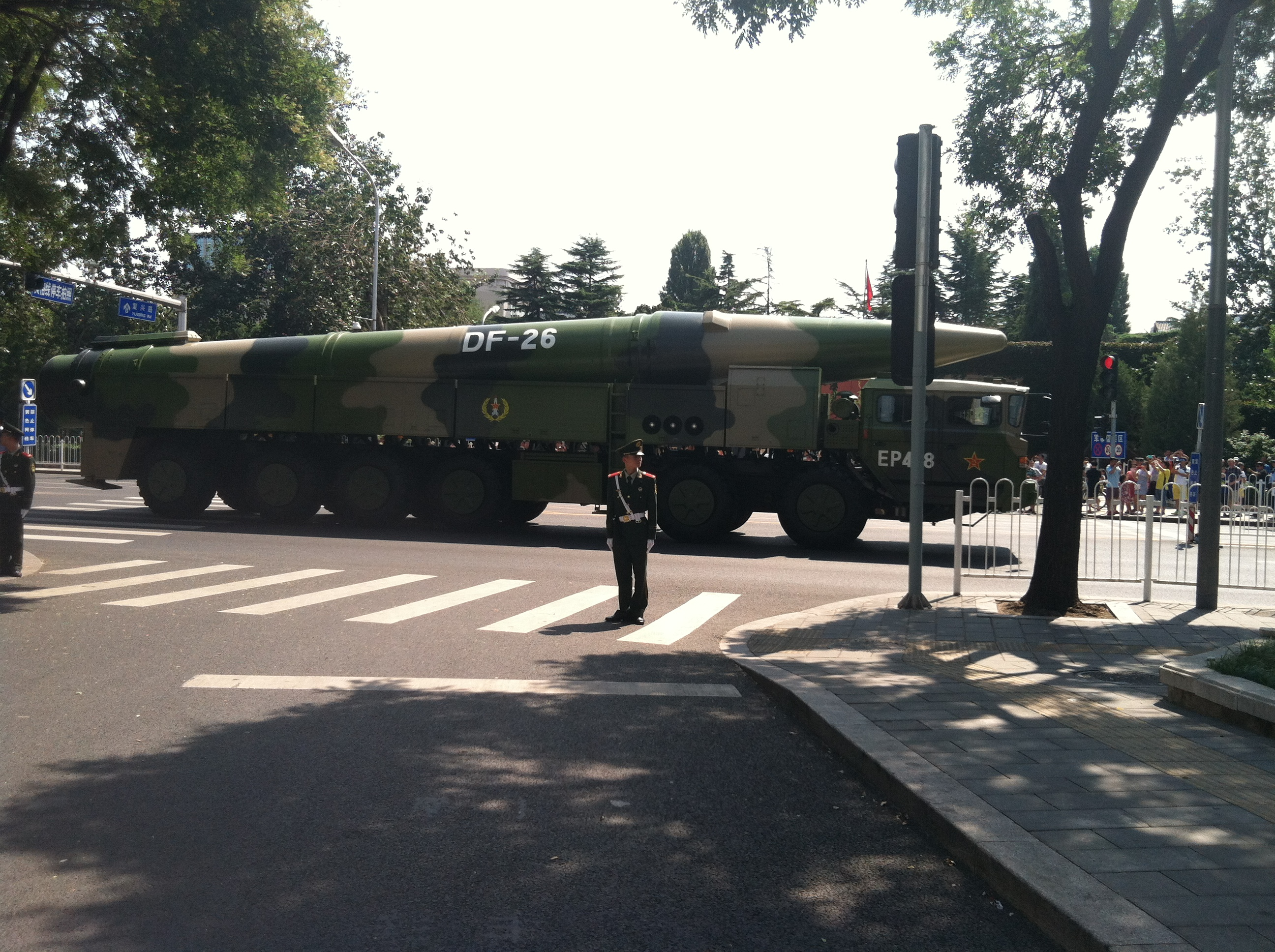
A DF-26 after the 2015 Beijing military parade.

The DF-26C is an IRBM with a range of at least 5,000 km (3,100 mi), far enough to reach U.S. naval bases in Guam. Few details are known, but it is believed to be solid-fuelled and road-mobile, allowing it to be stored in underground bunkers and fired at short notice, hence difficult to counter. It is possible that the DF-26C is a follow-up version of the DF-21. Possible warheads include conventional, nuclear or even maneuverable anti-ship and hypersonic glide warheads.

=== Dongfeng 27 ===
The DF-27 (CH-SS-X-24) is an intermediate-range ballistic missile (IRBM), equipped with a hypersonic glide vehicle (HGV) warhead. The ballistic missile was in development as of 2021, with a range of 5,000 km to 8,000 km.

=== Dongfeng 31 (CSS-10) ===
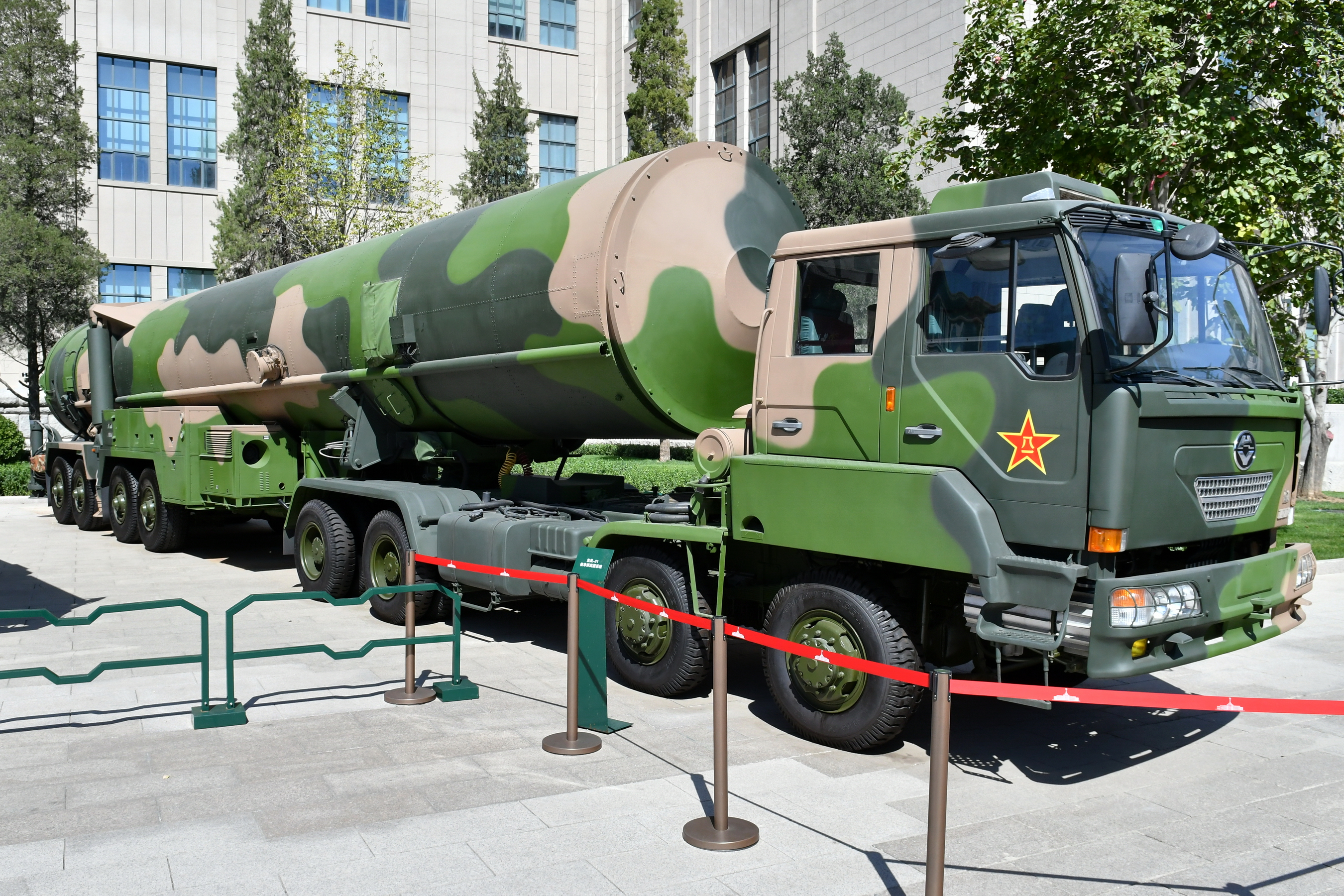
A DF-31 at the Military Museum of the Chinese People's Revolution.

The DF-31 (CSS-10) is a solid-fuel ICBM developed by China's 4th Aerospace Academy (now ARMT). The DF-31 has range of 8,000+ km, and can carry a single 1,000 kt warhead, or up to three 20-150 kt MIRV warheads. An improved version, the DF-31A, has range of 11,000+ km, far enough to reach Los Angeles from Beijing.

The DF-31 was developed to replace many of China's older ballistic missiles, and served as basis to the new JL-2 (CSS-NX-4/CSS-NX-5) SLBM. In 2009, approx. 30 DF-31/DF-31A are estimated to be in service; it is possible this number may have increased since then. 12 were displayed at the 2009 military parade in Beijing commemorating the 60th anniversary of the PRC's founding.

The DF-31AG uses a mobile launcher with improved mobility. It made its first official public appearance in the 2017 PLA Day Parade.

=== Dongfeng 41 (CSS-20) ===
The DF-41 (CSS-20) is a solid-fuel ICBM equipped to carry ten or twelve MIRV warheads. With an estimated range between 12,000 - 15,000 km, it is believed to surpass the range of the US's LGM-30 Minuteman ICBM to become the world's longest range missile.

=== Dongfeng 61 ===
The DF-61 is a solid-fuel ICBM and the newest addition to China's nuclear arsenal. It was unveiled at the 2025 China Victory Day Parade.

== See also ==
- Hwasong (missile family)
- Agni (missile family)
