= Zhang Zhenzhong =

Lieutenant general of People's Liberation Army, China

- 张振中

Deputy Chief of Staff of the Joint Staff Department of the Central Military Commission
- Incumbent
- Assumed office March 2022
- Chief of Staff: Li Zuocheng

Personal details
- Born: March 1961 (age 65) Hancheng County, Shaanxi, China
- Party: Chinese Communist Party
- Education: Northwestern Polytechnical University

Military service
- Allegiance: People's Republic of China
- Branch/service: People's Liberation Army Ground Force
- Years of service: ?–present
- Rank: Lieutenant general

Chinese name
- Simplified Chinese: 张振中
- Traditional Chinese: 張振中
Transcriptions
Standard Mandarin
- Hanyu Pinyin: Zhāng Zhènzhōng

Zhang Zhenzhong (Chinese: 张振中; born March 1961) is a lieutenant general in the People's Liberation Army of China.

He was an alternate of the 19th Central Committee of the Chinese Communist Party.

== Biography ==
Zhang was born in Hancheng County, Shaanxi, in March 1961, and graduated from Northwestern Polytechnical University.

Zhang used to be chief of staff and deputy commander of Jiuquan Satellite Launch Center, commander of Xichang Satellite Launch Center, general commander of Wenchang Space Launch Site, and commander of the Rocket Army Base. In July 2016, he was commissioned as deputy commander of the People's Liberation Army Rocket Force, he remained in that position until March 2022, when he was appointed deputy chief of staff of the Joint Staff Department of the Central Military Commission.

He attained the rank of lieutenant general (zhongjiang) in July 2017.
