= Zhou Yaning =

Chinese army general

- 周亚宁

Commander of the People's Liberation Army Rocket Force
- In office September 2017 – January 2022
- Preceded by: Wei Fenghe
- Succeeded by: Li Yuchao

Personal details
- Born: December 1957 (age 68) Nangong, Hebei, China
- Party: Chinese Communist Party

Military service
- Allegiance: China
- Branch/service: PLA Rocket Force
- Years of service: 1976-2022
- Rank: General

Zhou Yaning (Chinese: 周亚宁; born December 1957) is a general (shang jiang) of the People's Liberation Army (PLA) of China. He served as commander of the PLA Rocket Force from 2017 to 2022.

== Biography ==
Zhou Yaning was born in Nangong, Hebei. He joined the People's Liberation Army in December 1976, at the age of 19. Zhou rose through the ranks of the Second Artillery Corps. In January 2015, he was appointed deputy commander of the PLA Second Artillery Force (later renamed as PLA Rocket Force). Zhou replaced Wei Fenghe as commander of the PLA Rocket Force in September 2017, and was promoted to the rank of lieutenant general in August 2016. Zhou also served as 52nd Base Commander, 53rd Base Commander, and a variety of other command positions in the Second Artillery.

In October 2017, Zhou was elected a member of the 19th Central Committee of the Chinese Communist Party.

On 29 December 2023, Zhou was removed from his position as a representative of the 14th National People's Congress.
