= Li Yuchao =

Chinese general

- 李玉超

Commander of the People's Liberation Army Rocket Force
- In office January 2022 – July 2023
- Preceded by: Zhou Yaning
- Succeeded by: Wang Houbin

Chief of Staff of the People's Liberation Army Rocket Force
- In office April 2020 – January 2022
- Preceded by: Li Jun
- Succeeded by: Sun Jinming

Personal details
- Born: November 1962 (age 63) Sui County, Henan, China
- Party: Chinese Communist Party (expelled in 2024)
- Education: PLA National Defence University

Military service
- Allegiance: People's Republic of China
- Branch/service: People's Liberation Army Rocket Force
- Years of service: 1980–2023
- Rank: General

Li Yuchao (Chinese: 李玉超; pinyin: Lǐ Yùchāo; born November 1962) is a general (shangjiang) of the People's Liberation Army (PLA) who served as the commander of People's Liberation Army Rocket Force between January 2022 and July 2023.

Li was an alternate of the 19th Central Committee of the Chinese Communist Party (CCP), and a member of the 20th Central Committee. He placed under investigation by the Commission for Discipline Inspection of the Central Military Commission in July 2023, and expelled from the CCP in July 2024.

== Biography ==
Li was born in Sui County, Henan, in November 1962 and joined the PLA in December 1980. He graduated from the PLA National Defence University. He served in the Second Artillery Corps for a long time. He led his troops participate the 60th anniversary of the People's Republic of China in 2009 and the 2015 China Victory Day Parade in 2015, respectively. He was commander of the 53rd Base from March 2015 to July 2016, the 55th Base from July 2016 to March 2017, and the 63rd Base from March 2017 to April 2020. He was assigned chief of staff of the People's Liberation Army Rocket Force in April 2020, and rose to become commander in January 2022.

He was promoted to the rank of major general (shaojiang) in July 2013, lieutenant general (zhongjiang) in April 2020 and general (shangjiang) in January 2022.

=== Downfall ===
In July 2023 the South China Morning Post reported that Li was under the investigation of the Commission for Discipline Inspection of the Central Military Commission. Later that month, Li was officially removed from his post as commander, being succeeded by Wang Houbin. On 29 December 2023, the Standing Committee of the National People's Congress (NPC) announced Li was removed as a delegate to the NPC due to "serious violation of discipline and law". In July 2024, the 3rd Plenary Session of the 20th CCP Central Committee confirmed the decision to expel Li.

Military offices
| Preceded by Li Jun | Chief of Staff of the People's Liberation Army Rocket Force; 2020–2022 | Succeeded by Sun Jinming |
| Preceded by Zhou Yaning | Commander of the People's Liberation Army Rocket Force; 2022–2023 | Succeeded by Wang Houbin |
