= Jing Zhiyuan =

Chinese general

- 靖志远
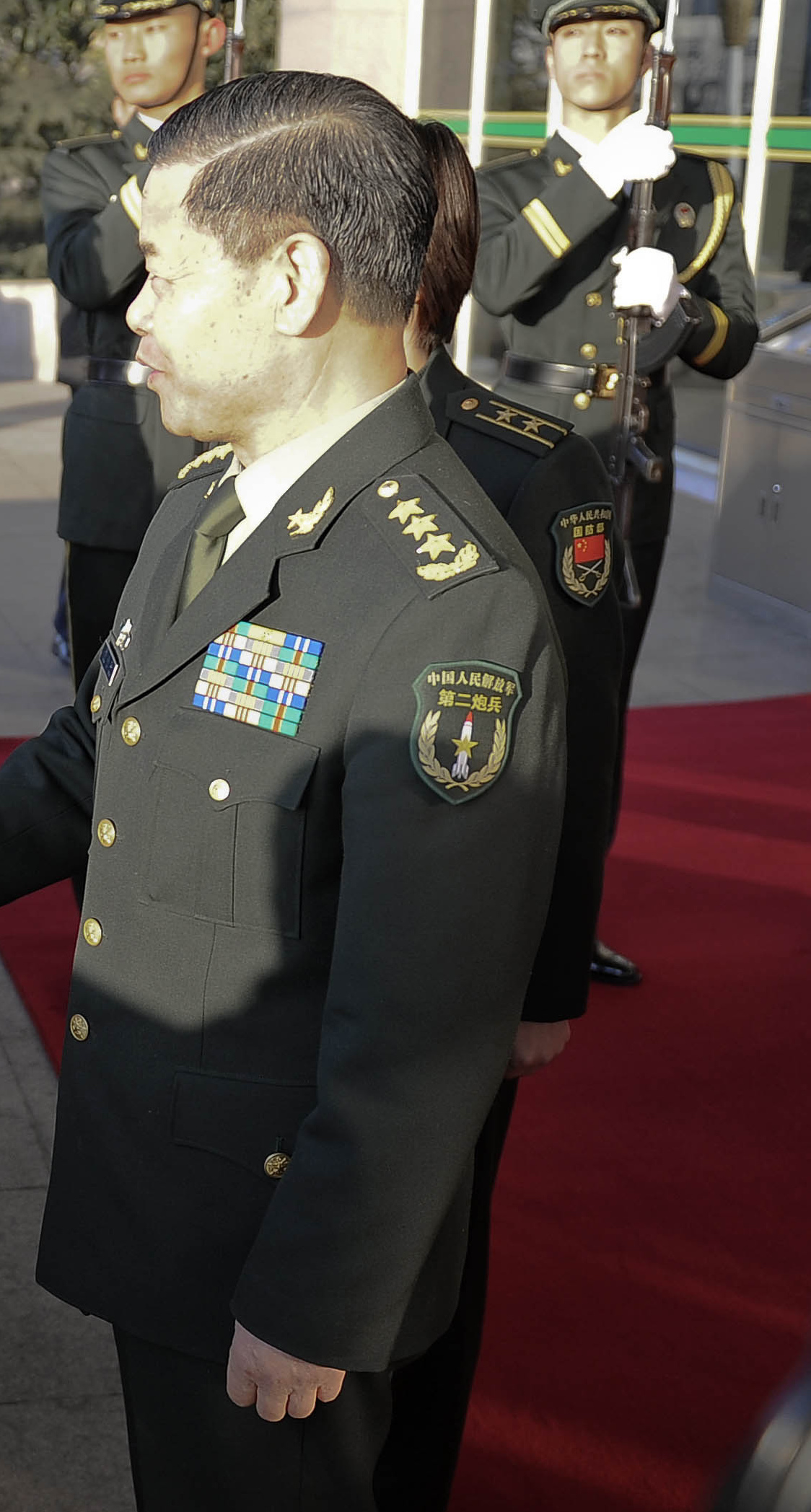
- Jing Zhiyuan in January 2011.
- Born: 1944 (age 81–82); Shandong, China
- Military career
- Allegiance: People's Republic of China
- Branch: PLA Second Artillery Corps
- Service years: 1963-2013
- Rank: General
- Commands: Second Artillery Corps

Jing Zhiyuan (Chinese: 靖志远; pinyin: Jìng Zhìyuǎn; born 1944) is a retired general (shang jiang) in the Chinese People's Liberation Army. He served as commander of the Second Artillery Corps.

== Military career ==
His ancestors are from Linshu, Shandong province, and he was born in Xiangyang, Hubei province. Jing joined the People's Liberation Army in August 1963. From November 1985 to February 1993, he served as the head of the base general staff and the deputy commander of the Second Artillery Corps. He became a major general in the PLA in July 1990. From 1993 to February 1999, Jing served as the commander of the base of the Second Artillery Corps. From 1999 to January 2003, he served as the head of the general staff of the Corps and a member of the Chinese Communist Party standing committee for it. He became a lieutenant general in July 2000. In 2003, he returned to his previous post as commander of the Second Artillery Corps. In September 2004, along with Zhang Dingfa from the People's Liberation Army Navy (PLAN), Jing was chosen to become a member of the Central Military Commission; he was the first commander from the Second Artillery to receive this appointment. He was elevated to the rank of general on September 20, 2004. He retired in November 2012 and was replaced by General Wei Fenghe, and retired from Central Military Commission in March 2013.
