= Wu Qian (military officer) =

Chinese military officer

- 吴谦
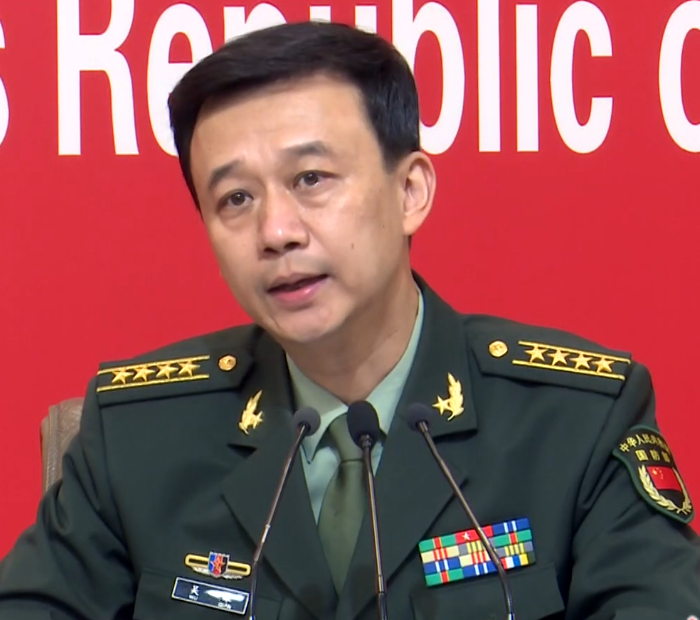
- Wu in 2019

Defense Attaché to Egypt
- Incumbent
- Assumed office July 2025

Director of the Information Bureau of Ministry of National Defense
- In office August 2017 – May 2025
- Preceded by: Yang Yujun
- Succeeded by: Jiang Bin

Personal details
- Born: 1973 (age 52–53) Beijing, China
- Party: Chinese Communist Party
- Children: 1
- Education: PLA Institute of International Relations; University of Birmingham (MBA)
- Occupation: Public affairs officer

Military service
- Allegiance: People's Republic of China
- Service: People's Liberation Army Strategic Support Force
- Years of service: 1996–present
- Rank: Major General (Shao Jiang)

Chinese name
- Traditional Chinese: 吳謙
- Simplified Chinese: 吴谦
Transcriptions
Standard Mandarin
- Hanyu Pinyin: Wú Qiān

Wu Qian (Chinese: 吴谦; born 1973) is a Chinese military officer currently serving as the Chinese defense attaché to Egypt. He formerly served as the director and spokesman of the Information Bureau of Ministry of National Defense of the People's Republic of China from 2017 to 2025.

== Biography ==
Wu was born in Beijing in 1973. In 1991, he was accepted to the PLA Institute of International Relations, and graduated in 1995. He also earned a Master of Business Administration from the University of Birmingham.

After university, he was assigned to the Ministry of National Defense of the People's Republic of China. In June 2015 he became the deputy director of the Information Bureau of Ministry of National Defense, rising to the Director in August 2017.

He was promoted to the rank of Senior colonel (Daxiao) in December 2016.

In July 2025, he was promoted to the rank of major general (Shao Jiang) and was appointed as Defense Attaché to Egypt.

=== As spokesperson for China's defense ministry ===
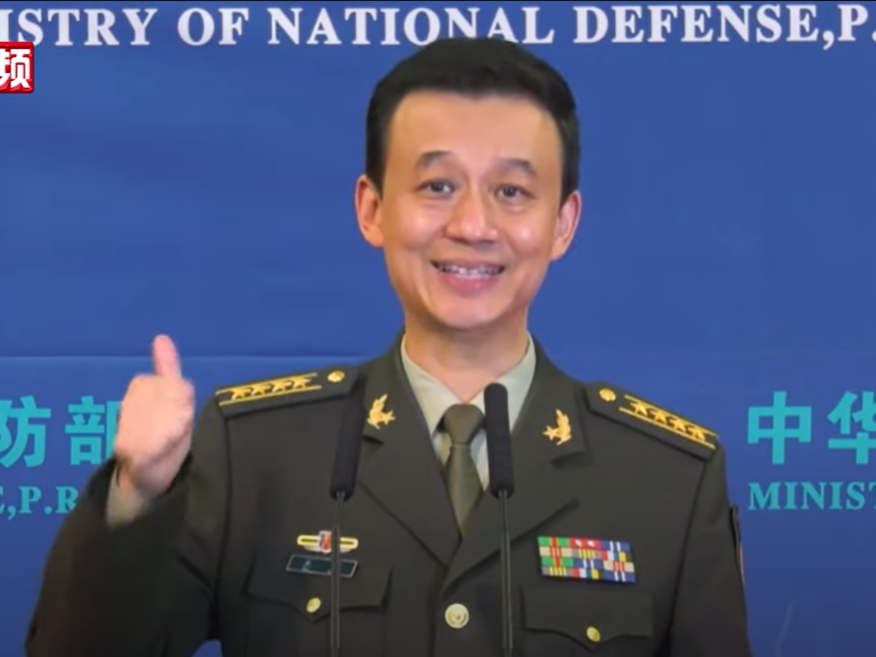
Wu as spokesman for China's defence ministry, 2021

In May 2024, as the spokesperson for China's defence ministry, Wu described the deployed U.S. missiles in the Philippines as "strategic and offensive weapons with a Cold War colour". In November 2024, he also criticized Taiwanese president Lai Ching-te's trip to Hawaii and Guam. He opposed "China's Taiwan region" of any "official interaction".

In December 2024, Taiwanese officials became alarmed over China's large deployment of naval and coast guard ships near Taiwan. Wu commented on this activity by quoting Sun Tzu's Art of War saying that military tactics adapt to changing conditions much like flowing water.

== Personal life ==
He is married and has a daughter.

Military offices
Preceded by Yang Yujun (杨宇军)	Director of the Information Bureau of Ministry of National Defense of the People's Republic of China; 2017-2025	Succeeded by Jiang Bin (人蒋斌)
