= Wang Houbin =

Chinese general

- 王厚斌

Commander of the People's Liberation Army Rocket Force
- In office July 2023 – October 2025
- Preceded by: Li Yuchao

Deputy Commander of the People's Liberation Army Navy
- In office December 2019 – July 2023
- Commander: Shen Jinlong; Dong Jun

Deputy Chief of Staff of the People's Liberation Army Navy
- In office April 2018 – December 2019
- Chief of Staff: Zhang Wendan

Chief of Staff of South Sea Fleet
- In office July 2016 – April 2018
- Preceded by: Li Yujie
- Succeeded by: Wu Dongzhu

Personal details
- Born: 1961 (age 64–65) Dangshan County, Anhui, China
- Party: Chinese Communist Party

Military service
- Allegiance: China
- Branch/service: People's Liberation Army Rocket Force (2023–2025); People's Liberation Army Navy (1979–2023)
- Years of service: 1979–2025
- Rank: General

Wang Houbin (Chinese: 王厚斌; pinyin: Wáng Hòubīn; born 1961) is a general and former vice admiral of the People's Liberation Army of China. As of July 2023, he is serving as the commander of the People's Liberation Army Rocket Force. He was previously deputy commander of the People's Liberation Army Navy from 2019 to 2023 and formerly served as its Deputy Chief of Staff. He attained the rank of rear admiral (shaojiang) in December 2014, and was promoted to the rank of vice admiral (zhongjiang) in December 2019. On 31 July 2023, he was promoted to the rank of general. He was expelled by the Chinese Communist Party on 17 October 2025.

== Biography ==
Wang enlisted in the People's Liberation Army (PLA) in 1979. He was Deputy Chief of Staff of East Sea Fleet and Deputy Commander of Zhoushan Coastal Defence Region before serving as Chief of Staff of South Sea Fleet in January 2016. In April 2018, he was promoted to become Deputy Chief of Staff of the People's Liberation Army Navy (PLAN), a position he held until December 2019, when he was appointed Deputy Commander there.

Military offices
Preceded by Li Yujie	Chief of Staff of South Sea Fleet; 2016–2018	Succeeded by Wu Dongzhu
Preceded by Li Yuchao	Commander of the People's Liberation Army Rocket Force; 2023–2025	
