= People's Liberation Army Rocket Force =

Strategic and tactical missile force of the Chinese People's Liberation Army

- 中国人民解放军火箭军
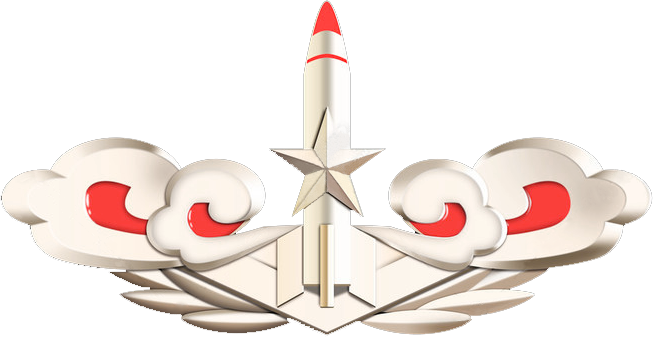
- Emblem of the People's Liberation Army Rocket Force
- Founded: 1 July 1966; 60 years ago
- Country: China
- Allegiance: Chinese Communist Party
- Type: Tactical and strategic missile force
- Role: Strategic deterrence Second strike
- Size: 120,000+ personnel
- Part of: People's Liberation Army
- Headquarters: Qinghe, Haidian, Beijing, China
- March: 火箭军进行曲 ("March of the Rocket Force")
- Anniversaries: 1 July annually
- Equipment: Ballistic missiles; Cruise missiles; Hypersonic glide vehicles
- Engagements: Third Taiwan Strait Crisis

Commanders
- Commander: General Lei Kai (Acting)
- Political Commissar: General Xu Xisheng

Insignia
- Flag

- Badge

- Sleeve badge

The People's Liberation Army Rocket Force, (Note: PLARF; Chinese: 中国人民解放军火箭军; pinyin: Zhōngguó Rénmín Jiěfàngjūn Huǒjiàn Jūn) formerly the Second Artillery Corps, (Note: Chinese: 第二炮兵) is the strategic and tactical missile force of the People's Republic of China. The PLARF is the 4th branch of the People's Liberation Army (PLA) and manages China's arsenal of land-based ballistic, hypersonic, cruise missiles—both nuclear and conventional.

The armed service branch was established on 1 July 1966 and made its first public appearance on 1 October 1984. The headquarters for operations is located at Qinghe, Beijing. The PLARF is under the direct command of the Chinese Communist Party's Central Military Commission (CMC). The name was changed from the PLA Second Artillery Corps to the PLA Rocket Force on 1 January 2016.

The PLARF comprises more than 120,000 personnel and six ballistic missile "Bases" (units at roughly corps or army group grade), plus 3 support Bases in charge of storage, engineering, and training respectively. The six operational Bases are independently deployed in the five Theaters throughout China. and each controls a number of brigades.

China has the largest land-based missile arsenal in the world. According to United States Department of Defense estimates, this includes 400 ground-launched cruise missiles, 900 conventionally armed short-range ballistic missiles, 1,300 conventional medium-range ballistic missiles, 500 conventional intermediate-range ballistic missiles, as well as 400 intercontinental ballistic missiles. Many of these are extremely accurate, which would allow them to destroy targets even without nuclear warheads. In 2025, the Federation of American Scientists estimated the Chinese nuclear stockpile at around 600 warheads (the majority stored and not directly operational), while the Pentagon estimates that the PRC will have around 1,000 warheads by 2030.

== History ==
=== Second Artillery Corps ===
China established the Second Artillery as a branch of the PLA designed to operate its nuclear missiles. Top political leadership retained centralized control over the nuclear arsenal. In 1967, the CMC issued the Temporary Regulations on the Second Artillery's Basic Tasks and Command Relationships, which established a direct line of command to the nuclear missile units and specified that "force development, deployments, maneuvers, and especially its combat [operations] must all be under the collective leadership of the CMC; extremely strictly [and] extremely precisely, obeying and carrying out the orders of the CMC."

In the 1970s, the nuclear weapons program saw the development of MRBM, IRBM and ICBMs and marked the beginning of a deterrent force. China continued MRBM deployment, began deploying the Dongfeng-3 IRBM and successfully tested and commenced deployment of the Dongfeng-4 (CSS-4) limited-range ICBM.

In 1980, the CMC stated that the Second Artillery should operate under the principles of "close defense" to ensure survivability of the nuclear force and "key point counterstrikes" to carry out retaliation. In 1984, the Second Artillery added a third principle, reflecting Deng Xiaoping's preferences, that the nuclear force be "lean and effective". The Second Artillery made its first public appearance on 1 October 1984.

In the late 1980s, China was the world's third-largest nuclear power, possessing a small but credible nuclear deterrent force of approximately 100 to 400 nuclear weapons. Beginning in the late 1970s, China deployed a full range of nuclear weapons and acquired a nuclear second-strike capability. The nuclear forces were operated by the 100,000-person Strategic Missile Force, which was controlled directly by the General Staff.

China began developing nuclear weapons in the late 1950s with substantial Soviet assistance. With the Sino-Soviet split in the late 1950s and early 1960s, the Soviet Union withheld plans and data for an atomic bomb, abrogated the agreement on transferring defense and nuclear technology, and began the withdrawal of Soviet advisers in 1960. Despite the termination of Soviet assistance, China committed itself to continue nuclear weapons development to break "the superpowers' monopoly on nuclear weapons," to ensure Chinese security against the Soviet and American threats, and to increase Chinese prestige and power internationally.

China made rapid progress in the 1960s in developing nuclear weapons. In a 32-month period, China successfully tested its first atomic bomb on October 16, 1964, at Lop Nor, launched its first nuclear missile on October 27, 1966, and detonated its first hydrogen bomb on June 17, 1967. Deployment of the Dongfeng-1 conventionally armed short-range ballistic missile and the Dongfeng-2 (CSS-1) medium-range ballistic missile (MRBM) occurred in the 1960s. The Dongfeng-3 (CCS-2) intermediate-range ballistic missile (IRBM) was successfully tested in 1969. Although the Cultural Revolution disrupted the strategic weapons program less than other scientific and educational sectors in China, there was a slowdown in succeeding years.

Gansu hosted a missile launching area. China destroyed 9 U-2 surveillance craft while two went missing when they attempted to spy on it.

By 1980, China had overcome the slowdown in nuclear development caused by the Cultural Revolution and had successes in its strategic weapons program. In May 1980, China successfully test launched its full-range ICBM, the Dongfeng-5 (CCS-4); the missile flew from central China to the Western Pacific, where it was recovered by a naval task force. The Dongfeng-5 possessed the capability to hit targets in the Soviet Union and the western United States.

In 1981, China launched three satellites into space orbit from a single launch vehicle, indicating that China might possess the technology to develop multiple independently targetable reentry vehicles (MIRVs). China also launched the Type 092 submarine SSBN (Xia-class) in 1981, and the next year it conducted its first successful test launch of the Julang-2 submarine-launched ballistic missile (CSS-NX-4).

In addition to the development of a sea-based nuclear force, China began considering the development of tactical nuclear weapons. PLA exercises featured the simulated use of tactical nuclear weapons in offensive and defensive situations beginning in 1982. Reports of Chinese possession of tactical nuclear weapons had remained unconfirmed in 1987.

In 1986, China possessed a credible deterrent force with land, sea and air elements. Land-based forces included ICBMs, IRBMs, and MRBMs. The sea-based strategic force consisted of SSBNs. The Air Force's bombers were capable of delivering nuclear bombs but would be unlikely to penetrate the sophisticated air defenses of modern military powers.

During the 1999 NATO bombing of Yugoslavia, the United States bombed the Chinese embassy in Belgrade. Believing that the bombing was intentional, Chinese leadership worried that China was significantly lacking in leverage against the United States. Among the measures China took to close its lack in leverage were efforts to develop precision missiles and accelerating plans to expand conventional missile forces.

China's nuclear forces, in combination with the PLA's conventional forces, served to deter both nuclear and conventional attacks on the Chinese lands. Chinese leaders pledged to not use nuclear weapons first (no first use), but pledged to absolutely counter-attack with nuclear weapons if nuclear weapons are used against China. China envisioned retaliation against strategic and tactical attacks and would probably strike countervalue rather than counterforce targets.

The combination of China's few nuclear weapons and technological factors such as range, accuracy, and response time limited the effectiveness of nuclear strikes against counterforce targets. China has been seeking to increase the credibility of its nuclear retaliatory capability by dispersing and concealing its nuclear forces in difficult terrain, improving their mobility, and hardening its missile silos.

The CJ-10 long-range cruise missile made its first public appearance during the military parade on the 60th Anniversary of the People's Republic of China; the CJ-10 represents the next generation in rocket weapons technology in the PLA.

In late 2009, it was reported that the Corps was constructing a 3,000–5,000-kilometre (1,900–3,100 mi) long underground launch and storage facility for nuclear missiles in the Hebei province. 47 News reported that the facility was likely located in the Taihang Mountains.

The DF-ZF hypersonic glide vehicle (HGV) made its first flight test on 9 January 2014; it likely entered service by October 2019. It is believed to have atop speed of Mach 10, or 12,360 km/h (7,680 mph).

Two Chinese technical papers from December 2012 and April 2013 show that China has concluded that hypersonic weapons pose "a new aerospace threat" and that they are developing satellite directed precision guidance systems. China is the third country to enter the "hypersonic arms race" after Russia and the United States. The U.S. Air Force has flown the X-51A Waverider technology demonstrator and the U.S. Army has flight tested the Advanced Hypersonic Weapon. China later confirmed the successful test flight of a "hypersonic missile delivery vehicle," but claimed it was part of a scientific experiment and not aimed at a target.

Since 2013, the Second Artillery operated the Kuaizhou family of launch vehicles, derived from the DF-21.

=== People's Liberation Army Rocket Force ===
The name was changed from the PLA Second Artillery Corps to the PLA Rocket Force on 1 January 2016. Despite claims by some, there appears to be no evidence to suggest that the new generation of Chinese ballistic-missile submarines came under PLARF control.

US Air Force National Air and Space Intelligence Center estimated that as of 2023 the number of Chinese nuclear warheads capable of reaching the United States has expanded well over 200.

In June 2021, James Martin Center for Nonproliferation Studies has found out that China is constructing new missile silo field in Gansu in western China. According to the satellite picture, 119 missile silos for intercontinental ballistic missiles are under construction near Yumen City. In July, Federation Of American Scientists found out there are another 110 silos being built in Hami, Xinjiang. The two significant expansion projects include silos more than ten times the number of ICBM silos in operation of PLARF today.

In July 2021, China tested globe-circling hypersonic missile including the unprecedented launch of a separate 2nd missile from the ultra-high-speed vehicle according to the Financial Times and Wall Street Journal. The test showed China's development of its strategic, nuclear-capable weapons as more advanced than any had thought, surprising Pentagon officials, the two newspapers said. Neither the United States nor Russia has demonstrated the same ability, which requires launching a missile from a parent vehicle traveling five times the speed of sound. According to reporting by the Financial Times, this weapons system consists of two parts: a fractional orbital bombardment system (FOBS) and a hypersonic glide vehicle (HGV).

In July 2023, South China Morning Post reported that PLARF commander Li Yuchao and deputy commander Liu Guangbin were under the investigation by the CMC Commission for Discipline Inspection. Later that month, both Li Yuchao and Liu Guangbin were officially removed from their posts, while Wang Houbin was appointed as the commander of the PLARF. Additionally, Xu Xisheng was appointed as the political commissar. Li Yuchao and Liu Guangbin's expulsion has not been formally explained. There are rumors that they are being investigated for corruption or disclosing military secrets. Furthermore, it was thought to be an odd decision to replace the Rocket Force commander with military personnel from outside the branch, and this led to concerns about the security, credibility, and integrity of the PLA as well as its participation in China's military tactics during the Taiwan Strait conflict.

On 25 September 2024 at 00:44 UTC, the PLARF performed its first intercontinental ballistic missile (ICBM) test over the Pacific Ocean since the early 1980s. The specific ICBM that was launched was not stated.

=== Missile ranges ===
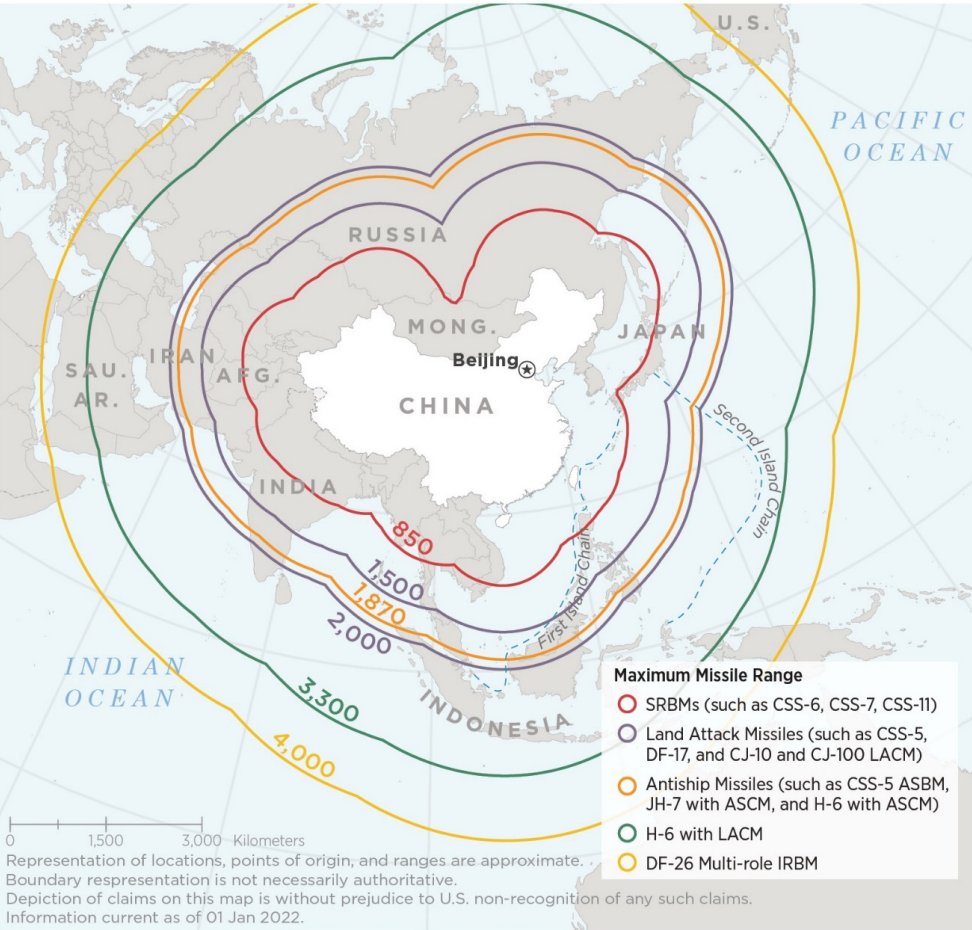
Chinese Conventional Strike Ranges as of 2022

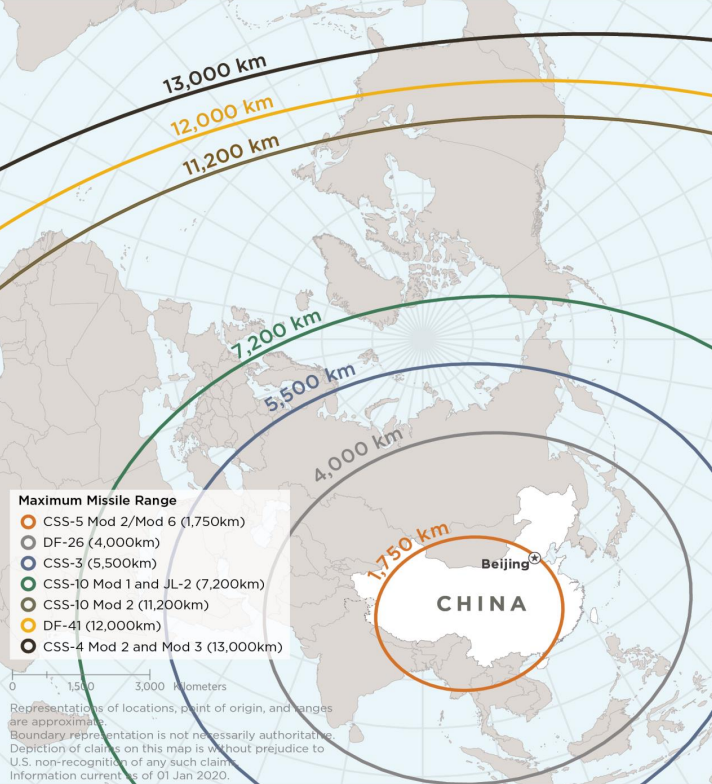
Chinese Nuclear Ballistic Missile Strike Ranges as of 2022

== Ranks ==
=== Officers ===
Title	上将 Shang jiang	中将 Zhong jiang	少将 Shao jiang	大校 Da xiao	上校 Shang xiao	中校 Zhong xiao	少校 Shao xiao	上尉 Shang wei	中尉 Zhong wei	少尉 Shao wei	学员 Xue yuan
Equivalent translation	General	Lieutenant general	Major general	Senior colonel	Colonel	Lieutenant colonel	Major	Captain	First lieutenant	Second lieutenant	Officer cadet
Shoulder insignia											
Collar insignia											

=== Enlisted ===
Rank group	高级军士 Gāo jí jūn shì			中级军士 Zhōng jí jūn shì		初级军士 Chū jí jūn shì		义务兵 Yì wù bīng	
Title	一级军士长 Yī jí jūn shì zhǎng	二级军士长 Er jí jūn shì zhǎng	三级军士长 Sān jí jūn shì zhǎng	一级上士 Yī jí shàng shì	二级上士 Er jí shàng shì	中士 Zhōng shì	下士 Xià shì	上等兵 Shàng děng bīng	列兵 Liè bīng
Equivalent translation	Master Sergeant First Class	Master Sergeant Second Class	Master Sergeant Third Class	Staff Sergeant First Class	Staff Sergeant Second Class	Sergeant	Corporal	Private First Class	Private
Shoulder insignia									
Collar insignia									

== Leadership ==
Commander:

- Xiang Shouzhi (July - August 1967)
- Yang Junsheng (September 1968 - May 1969)
- Zhang Yixiang (May 1969 - April 1975)
- Xiang Shouzhi (April 1975 - September 1977)
- Li Shuiqing (September 1977 - November 1982)
- He Jinheng (November 1982 - July 1985)
- Li Xuge (July 1985 - November 1992)
- Yang Guoliang (November 1992 - January 2003)
- Jing Zhiyuan (January 2003 - October 2012)
- Wei Fenghe (October 2012 - August 2017)
- Zhou Yaning (August 2017 - January 2022)
- Li Yuchao (January 2022 - July 2023)
- Wang Houbin (July 2023 - October 2025)
- Lei Kai (December 2025 – present)

Political Commissars:

- Li Tianhuan (July 1967 - March 1968)
- Wu Lie (1968 -1970)
- Chen Fanong (1970 - 1975)
- Chen Heqiao (May 1975 - November 1982)
- Liu Lifeng (November 1982 - April 1990)
- Liu Anyuan (April 1990 - November 1992)
- Sui Yongju (November 1992 - November 1997)
- Sui Mingtai (November 1997 - December 2003)
- Peng Xiaofeng (December 2003 - December 2009)
- Zhang Haiyang (December 2009 - December 2014)
- Wang Jiasheng (December 2014 - July 2020)
- Xu Zhongbo (July 2020 - July 2023)
- Xu Xisheng (July 2023 – present)

== Equipment ==
=== Firearms ===
Name	Origin	Type	References
QSZ-92	PRC	Semi-automatic pistol	
QCQ-171	PRC	Submachine gun	
QBZ-95	PRC	Assault rifle	
QBZ-03	PRC	Assault rifle	
QBZ-191	PRC	Assault rifle	
QBU-88	PRC	Sniper rifle	

=== Active missiles ===
As of at least 2024, China has the largest land-based missile arsenal in the world.

Missile	NATO designation	Profile	Type	Operational range	TEL	Number	Warhead	Notes
CJ-10	CH-SSC-9 Mod 1		Cruise missile	1,500-2,000 km	WS2400	~72	Conventional	
CJ-10A	CH-SSC-9 Mod 2		Cruise missile		WS2400	~72	Conventional	
CJ-100	CH-SSC-13		Supersonic Cruise missile	4,000 km	WS2400	~54	Conventional	
CJ-1000			Hypersonic Cruise missile		WS2400		Nuclear/Conventional	
DF-5A	CSS-4 Mod 2		ICBM	13,000-20,000 km	SILO	18+	Nuclear	
DF-5B	CSS-4 Mod 3		ICBM		SILO	18+	Nuclear	
DF-5C	CSS-4 Mod 4 (uncertain)		ICBM		SILO	18+	Nuclear	
DF-11A	CSS-7		SRBM	700+ km	WS2400	~108	Conventional	
DF-15B	CSS-6		SRBM	800 km	TAS5450	~81	Conventional	
DF-16	CSS-11		SRBM		WS2500	~36	Conventional	
DF-17	CSS-22		MRBM	1,600 km	WS2500	~48	Conventional	Carries DF-ZF hypersonic glide vehicle (HGV)
DF-21A	CSS-5		MRBM	1,770 km	WS2600/HY4260	~24	Conventional	
DF-21E	CSS-5		MRBM	1,770 km	WS2600/HY4260	~24	Conventional	
DF-21C	CSS-5		MRBM	1,700 km	WS2600/HY4260	~30	Conventional	
DF-21D	CSS-5		MRBM	1,500 km	WS2600/HY4260	~30	Conventional	
DF-26	CSS-18		IRBM	5,000 km	HTF5680A1	~250	Conventional/nuclear	
DF-27			IRBM	5,000-8,000 km	HTF5680A1		Conventional/nuclear	Carries HGV
DF-31	CSS-10 Mod 1		ICBM	7,200-8,000 km	HY4330	~6	Nuclear	Silo-based
DF-31A	CSS-10 Mod 2 (uncertain)		ICBM	13,200 km	HY4330	~24	Nuclear	
DF-31AG	CSS-10 Mod 2 (uncertain)		ICBM		HTF5980/HY4330	~56	Nuclear	
DF-31BJ			ICBM		SILO	~150	Nuclear	
DF-41	CSS-20		ICBM	12,000-15,000 km	HTF5980	~44	Nuclear	
DF-61			ICBM	12,000-15,000 km	HTF5980		Nuclear	Carries HGV

=== Retired missiles ===
- DF-3A, CSS-2 (IRBM) – In service from 1971 to 2014

=== Transporter erector launchers ===
- TA580/TAS5380
- TA5450/TAS5450
- HTF5680A1
- HTF5980
- WS2300
- WS2400
- WS2500
- WS2600

=== Tractor trucks ===
- Hanyang HY4260
- Hanyang HY4330

== Structure ==
The PLARF is directly subordinated to the CMC. and headquartered in Beijing. The PLARF comprises more than 120,000 personnel, and is organized into six operational bases and three support bases; these are corps leader or corps deputy grade units. The operational bases cover geographical areas, and their ordnance mix reflects their location and mission. They are similarly structured with six to eight missile brigrades, support regiments, and at least one hospital. Base equipment inspection regiments are responsible for storing nuclear warheads. Bases have peacetime administrative control of nuclear forces. In wartime, the CMC has direct control over nuclear forces. Control over conventional forces is unclear; in 2022, there was evidence of continuing integration with theater commands.

The PLARF has operated a separate command and control structure from the rest of the PLA since 1967. The goal of the system is to ensure tight control of nuclear warheads at the highest levels of government. This is done by the Central Military Commission having direct control of the PLARF, outside of the structure of military regions. The six operational Bases are independently deployed in the five Theaters throughout China. and each controls a number of brigades.

The Military Unit Cover Designators (MUCD) from the April 2017 system for PLARF units are 5-digit numbers starting with "96" with the remaining digits organization details. MCUD's starting with "961" or "965" are from the pre-2017 MUCD system.

=== Headquarters ===
PLARF headquarters has four administrative departments: Staff Department, Political Work Department, Equipment Department, and Logistics Department.

Wang Houbin became PLARF commander in July 2023, Xu Xisheng was the political commissar in 2022.

=== Base 61 ===
Base 61 (第六十一基地), MUCD Unit 96601 is an operational base covering eastern and some of southeastern China with headquarters in Huangshan, Anhui. It was created in 1965.

Base 61 includes a brigade for testing its large short-ranged conventional missile inventory and an unmanned aerial vehicle regiment for intelligence, surveillance and reconnaissance.

Missile brigades
Name	Chinese name	MUCD	Location	Weapons	Nuclear capable	Notes
611		Unit 96711	Qingyang, Anhui	DF-26	Yes	Major upgrade underway
612		Unit 96712	Leping, Jingdezhen, Jiangxi	DF-21A	Yes	Possibly upgrading to DF-31AG
613		Unit 96713	Shangrao, Anhui	DF-15B	No	Possibly upgrading to DF-17
614		Unit 96714	Yong'an, Fujian	DF-17	Unknown	
615		Unit 96715	Meizhou, Guangdong	DF-11A	No	
616		Unit 96716	Ganzhou, Jiangxi	DF-17	No	New base added since 2020.
617		Unit 96717	Jinhua, Zhejiang	DF-16	No	
			Nanchang, Jiangxi		No	Status uncertain

=== Base 62 ===
Base 62 (第六十二基地), MUCD Unit 96602 is an operational base covering most of southeastern China with headquarters in Kunming, Yunnan. It was created in 1966.

Missile brigades
Name	Chinese name	MUCD	Location	Weapons	Nuclear capable	Notes
621		Unit 96721	Yibin, Sichuan	DF-31AG (uncertain)	Yes	
622		Unit 96722	Yuxi, Yunnan	DF-31A	Yes	
623		Unit 96723	Liuzhou, Guangxi	DF-10A	No	
624		Unit 96724	Danzhou, Hainan	DF-21D	No	Possibly upgrading to new missile
625		Unit 96725	Jianshui, Yunnan	DF-26	Yes	
626		Unit 96726	Qingyuan, Guangdong	DF-26	Yes	
627		Unit 96727	Puning. Jieyang, Guangdong	DF-17	No	Base expansion underway as of 2025

=== Base 63 ===
Base 63 (第六十三基地), MUCD Unit 96603 is an operational base covering southern inland China with headquarters in Huaihua, Hunan.

Base 63 includes a regiment responsible for fueling liquid-fuelled missiles.

Missile brigades
Name	Chinese name	MUCD	Location	Weapons	Nuclear capable	Notes
631		Unit 96731	Jingzhou, Hubei	DF-5B (possibly DF-5C)	Yes	6 silos, adding 6 more
632		Unit 96732	Shaoyang, Hunan	DF-31AG	Yes	
633		Unit 96733	Huitong, Hunan	DF-5A	Yes	6 silos
634		Unit 96734	Yueyang, Hunan	DF-5C (uncertain)	Unknown	12 silos under construction as of 2025
635		Unit 96735	Yichun, Jiangxi	DF-17 (uncertain)	No	
636		Unit 96736	Shaoguan, Guangdong	DF-16A	No	

=== Base 64 ===
Base 64 (第六十四基地), MUCD Unit 96604 is an operational base covering northwest and north-central China with headquarters in Lanzhou, Gansu.

Base 64 has an equipment inspection brigade instead of a regiment.

Missile brigades
Name	Chinese name	MUCD	Location	Weapons	Nuclear capable	Notes
641		Unit 96741	Hancheng, Shaanxi	DF-31 (uncertain)	Unknown	
641		Unit 96741	Hancheng, Shaanxi	DF-31AG	Yes	New based completed 2024
642		Unit 96742	Datong, Shanxi	DF-31AG	Yes	At least 3 dispersed launch units
643		Unit 96743	Tianshui, Gansu	DF-31AG	Yes	
644		Unit 96744	Hanzhong, Shaanxi	DF-41	Yes	
645		Unit 96745	Yinchuan, Ningxia	DF-41 (uncertain)	Unknown	
646		Unit 96746	Korla, Xinjiang	DF-21C DF-26	Yes	
647		Unit 96747	Zhangye, Qinghai	DF-26 (uncertain)	Unknown	New brigade base under construction as of 2025
			Hami, Xinjiang	DF-31A (uncertain)	Unknown	120 silos
			Yumen, Gansu	DF-31A (uncertain)	Unknown	110 silos

=== Base 65 ===
Base 65 (第六十五基地), MUCD Unit 96605 is an operational base covering eastern and northeastern China with headquarters in Shenyang, Liaoning. It was formerly Base 51.

Missile brigades
Name	Chinese name	MUCD	Location	Weapons	Nuclear capable	Notes
651		Unit 96751	Chifeng, Inner Mongolia	DF-41	Yes	
652		Unit 96752	Tonghua, Jilin	DF-31AG	Yes	
652		Unit 96752	Tonghua area	DF-31A (uncertain)	Yes	
653		Unit 96753	Laiwu, Shandong	DF-21D	No	Possibly upgrading to new missile
654		Unit 96754	Dengshahe, Liaoning	DF-26 (uncertain)	Unknown	Former DF-21A used for DF-26 support
654		Unit 96754	Dengshahe, Liaoning	DF-26 (uncertain)	Unknown	New base construction paused
654		Unit 96754	Huangling	DF-26	Yes	
655		Unit 96755	Tonghua, Jilin	DF-17 (uncertain)	No	Base upgrade underway as of 2025
656		Unit 96756	Linyi, Shandong	CJ-100 (uncertain)	No	
657		Unit 96757				Rumored new base
			Yulin, Shaanxi	DF-31A (uncertain)	Unknown	90 silos

=== Base 66 ===
Base 66 (第六十六基地), MUCD Unit 96606 is an operational base covering central China with headquarters in Luoyang, Henan. It was established in 1966.

Missile brigades
Name	Chinese name	MUCD	Location	Weapons	Nuclear capable	Notes
661		Unit 96761	Lushi, Henan	DF-5B	Yes	6 silos
661		Unit 96761	Sanmenxia	DF-5	Yes	New base
662		Unit 96762	Luanchuan, Henan	DF-5C (uncertain)	Yes	12 silos under construction 2025
663		Unit 96763	Nanyang, Henan	DF-31A	Yes	
664		Unit 96764	Xiangyang, Hubei	DF-31AG	Yes	
665		Unit 96765	Changzhi, Shanxi	DF-26 (uncertain)	Unknown	
666		Unit 96766	Xinyang, Henan	DF-26	Yes	

=== Base 67 ===
Base 67 (第六十七基地) is a support base headquartered in Baoji, Shaanxi, responsible for the storage, maintenance and distribution of China's nuclear weapons. Base 67 was created in 1958 as Unit 0674 in Haiyan County, Qinghai. It was transferred to the Commission for Science, Technology and Industry for National Defense in 1969 and moved to Shaanxi, and then to the Second Artillery Corps in 1980. It was known as Base 22 until 2017.

Base 67 includes the subterranean nuclear weapons storage complex in Taibai County in the Qin Mountains. Preparations to move the nuclear weapons storage facility to Taibai began in 1969. In 2010, relatively few warheads were maintained at operational base-level for extended durations. The distribution of warheads is reliant on the country's transportation network. The construction of the Baoji–Chengdu railway by the PLA in the 1960s may have been to support warhead distribution. A derailment inside a tunnel during the 2008 Sichuan earthquake shutdown the Baoji–Chengdu railway for 12 days. In another incident, a Second Artillery Corps crane was used to clear a multiple-vehicle collision caused by icy roads in the Qin Mountains.

The Missile Technical Service Brigade is the main unit overseeing the Taibai facility. Its main focus seems to be warhead storage and maintenance. It is complemented by the brigade-sized Unit 96038 which seems focused on inspection and testing of certain warhead components. Unit 96038 includes a security battalion with the 38-member "Sharp Blade" Special Operations Team (利刃特种大队) for site defense and the "Guardian Spirits of the Restricted Zone" Security Company. The "Sharp Blade" unit also performs nuclear missile escort, warhead security and offensive tasks.

=== Base 68 ===
Base 68 (第六十八基地) is an engineering support base responsible for constructing physical infrastructure headquartered in Luoyang, Henan.

Base 68 was created as the PLARF Engineering Base in 2012 from the Engineering Technical Zongdui (ETZ); ETZ was created in 1962 to handle installation of test platforms for nuclear weapon and satellite tests. It was combined with 308th Engineering Command in 2017 to create Base 68.

Base 68 contains six engineering brigades plus support regiments.

=== Base 69 ===
Base 69 (第六十九基地) is a training support base created in 2017 headquartered in Yinchuan. It has four Test and Training Districts and various independent test and training regiments.

The 1st Test and Training District provides training in desert environments, and provides measurement and control support for missile tests. The 2nd Test and Training District hosts a opposing force (OPFOR) regiment for PLARF training. The 3rd Test and Training District provides training in plateau operations, hosts the PLARF's electronic warfare OPFOR unit, and supports the Gobi Desert test range. The 4th Test and Training District provides cruise missile and rail transport training.

== Operations in Saudi Arabia ==
The PLARF Golden Wheel Project (Chinese Wikipedia: 金轮工程) co-operates the DF-3 and DF-21 medium-range ballistic missiles in Saudi Arabia since the establishment of the Royal Saudi Strategic Missile Force in 1984.

== See also ==
- Dongfeng (missile)
- Nuclear triad
- List of states with nuclear weapons
- Qian Xuesen (also known as Tsien Hsue-shen)
- Army Rocket Force Command
