= Chinese frigate Yuncheng =

Type 054A frigate of the PLA Navy

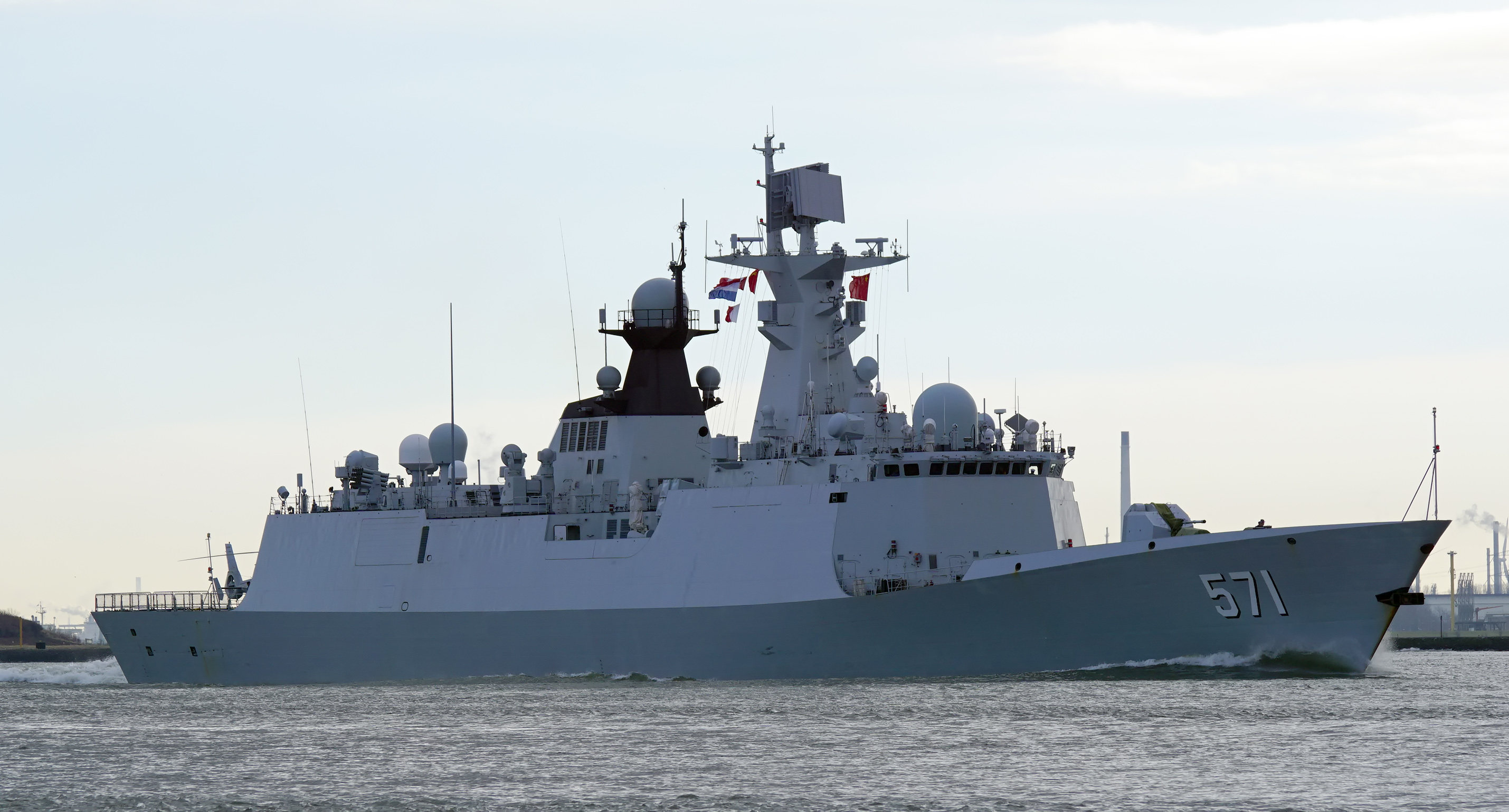
- Yuncheng in Rotterdam on 30 January 2015

History

China
- Name: Yuncheng
- Namesake: Yuncheng; (运城)
- Builder: Huangpu, Shanghai
- Launched: 8 February 2009
- Commissioned: December 2009
- Identification: Pennant number: 571
- Status: Active

General characteristics
- Class & type: Type 054A frigate
- Displacement: 4,053 tonnes (full)
- Length: 134.1 m (440 ft)
- Beam: 16 m (52 ft)
- Propulsion: CODAD, 4 × Shaanxi 16 PA6 STC diesels, 5700 kW (7600+ hp @ 1084 rpm) each
- Speed: 27 knots estimated
- Range: 8,025 nautical miles (9,235 mi; 14,862 km) estimated
- Complement: 165
- Sensors & processing systems: Type 382 Radar; Type 344 Radar (Mineral-ME Band Stand) OTH target acquisition and SSM fire control radar; 4 × Type 345 Radar(MR-90 Front Dome) SAM fire control radars; MR-36A surface search radar, I-band; Type 347G 76 mm gun fire control radar; 2 × Racal RM-1290 navigation radars, I-band; MGK-335 medium frequency active/passive sonar system; H/SJG-206 towed array sonar; ZKJ-4B/6 (developed from Thomson-CSF TAVITAC) combat data system; HN-900 Data link (Chinese equivalent of Link 11A/B, to be upgraded); SNTI-240 SATCOM; AKD5000S Ku band SATCOM
- Electronic warfare & decoys: Type 922-1 radar warning receiver; HZ-100 ECM & ELINT system; Kashtan-3 missile jamming system
- Armament: 1 × 32-cell VLS; HQ-16 SAM; Yu-8 anti submarine rocket launcher; 2 × 4 C-803 anti-ship / land attack cruise missiles; 1 × PJ26 76 mm dual purpose gun; 2 × Type 730 7-barrel 30 mm CIWS guns or Type 1130; 2 × 3 324mm Yu-7 ASW torpedo launchers; 2 × 6 Type 87 240mm anti-submarine rocket launcher (36 rockets carried); 2 × Type 726-4 18-tube decoy rocket launchers
- Aircraft carried: 1 Kamov Ka-28 'Helix' or Harbin Z-9C
- Aviation facilities: hangar

Yuncheng (571) is a Type 054A frigate of the People's Liberation Army Navy. She was commissioned in December 2009.

== Development and design ==
The Type 054A carries HQ-16 medium-range air defence missiles and anti-submarine missiles in a vertical launching system (VLS) system. The HQ-16 has a range of up to 50 km, with superior range and engagement angles to the Type 054's HQ-7. The Type 054A's VLS uses a hot launch method; a shared common exhaust system is sited between the two rows of rectangular launching tubes.

The four AK-630 close-in weapon systems (CIWS) of the Type 054 were replaced with two Type 730 CIWS on the Type 054A. The autonomous Type 730 provides improved reaction time against close-in threats.

== Construction and career ==
Yuncheng was launched on 8 February 2009 at the Huangpu Shipyard in Shanghai. She was commissioned in December 2009.

On November 2, 2011, Yuncheng and Haikou formed the tenth navy escort fleet from Zhanjiang City, Guangdong Province to perform escort missions in the Gulf of Aden and the waters of Somalia. The escort lasted 186 days, with a total voyage of 98,180 nautical miles, and completed 40 batches of 240 Chinese and foreign ships. On June 7, 2012, Yuncheng returned to Zhanjiang Military Port.

On October 22, 2012, Yuncheng, Haikou and Guangzhou crossed the waters south of Okinawa and went to the western Pacific waters for routine training.

On 19 December 2013, the South Sea Fleet consisting of Huangshan, Yuncheng, and Weishanhu set sail from Zhanjiang City and proceeded to the Western Pacific and other waters. Exercises in subjects such as continuous maritime alert, counter-terrorism and counter-piracy, and joint search and rescue.

In May 2014, the China National Offshore Oil Corporation's drilling platform Offshore Oil 981 conducted drilling operations in the Xisha waters. On May 13, Yuncheng arrived in the sea area where the drilling platform was located, driving away the Vietnamese coast guard ship that was interfering with the operation. On August 1, Yuncheng, Changbai Shan and Chaohu formed the eighteenth navy escort formation from a military port in Zhanjiang, and then went to the Gulf of Aden and Somalia.

Chaohu alongside Yuncheng and Changbai Shan made a goodwill visit to Rotterdam on 30 January 2015.

== Gallery ==
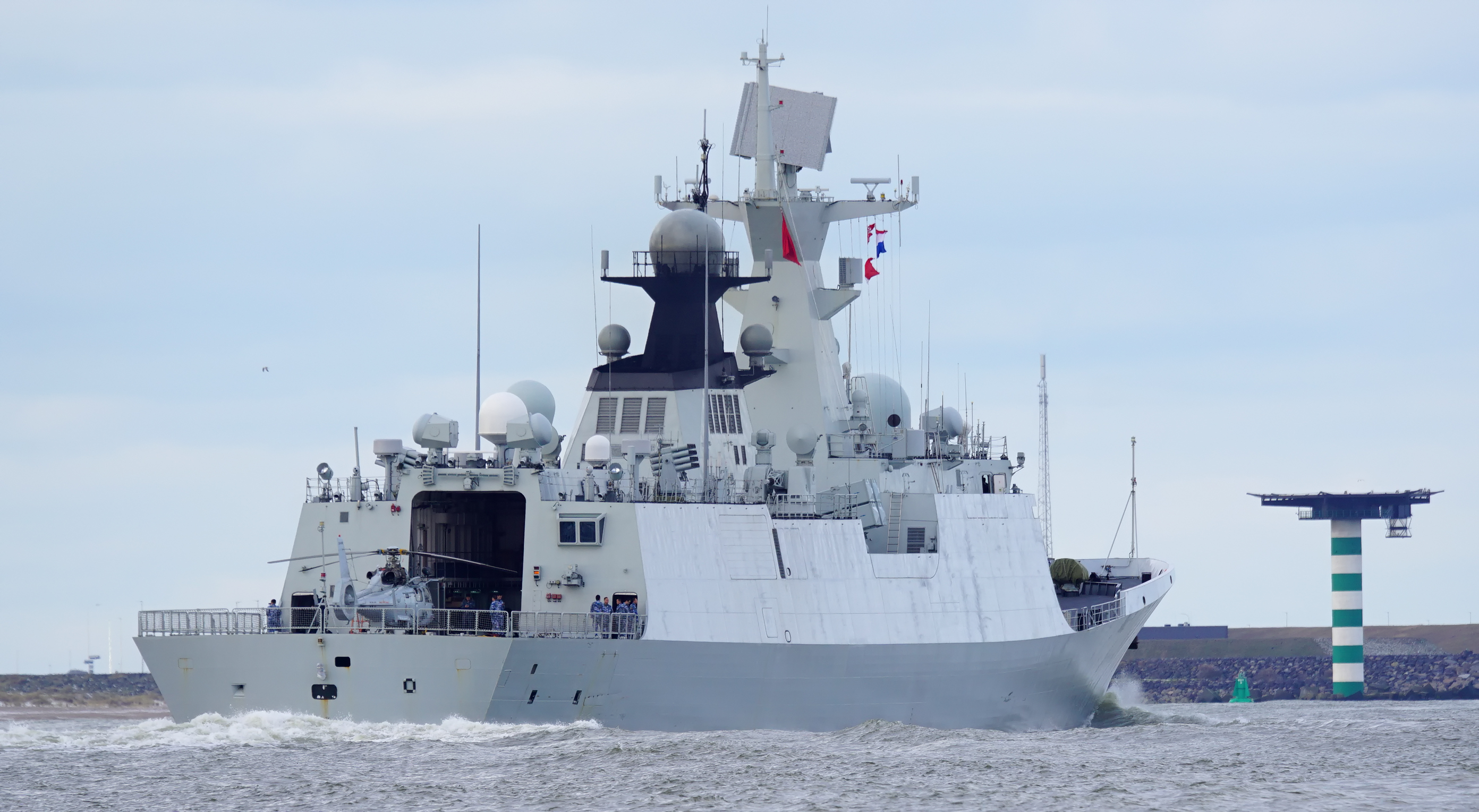
Yuncheng in Rotterdam on 30 January 2015.

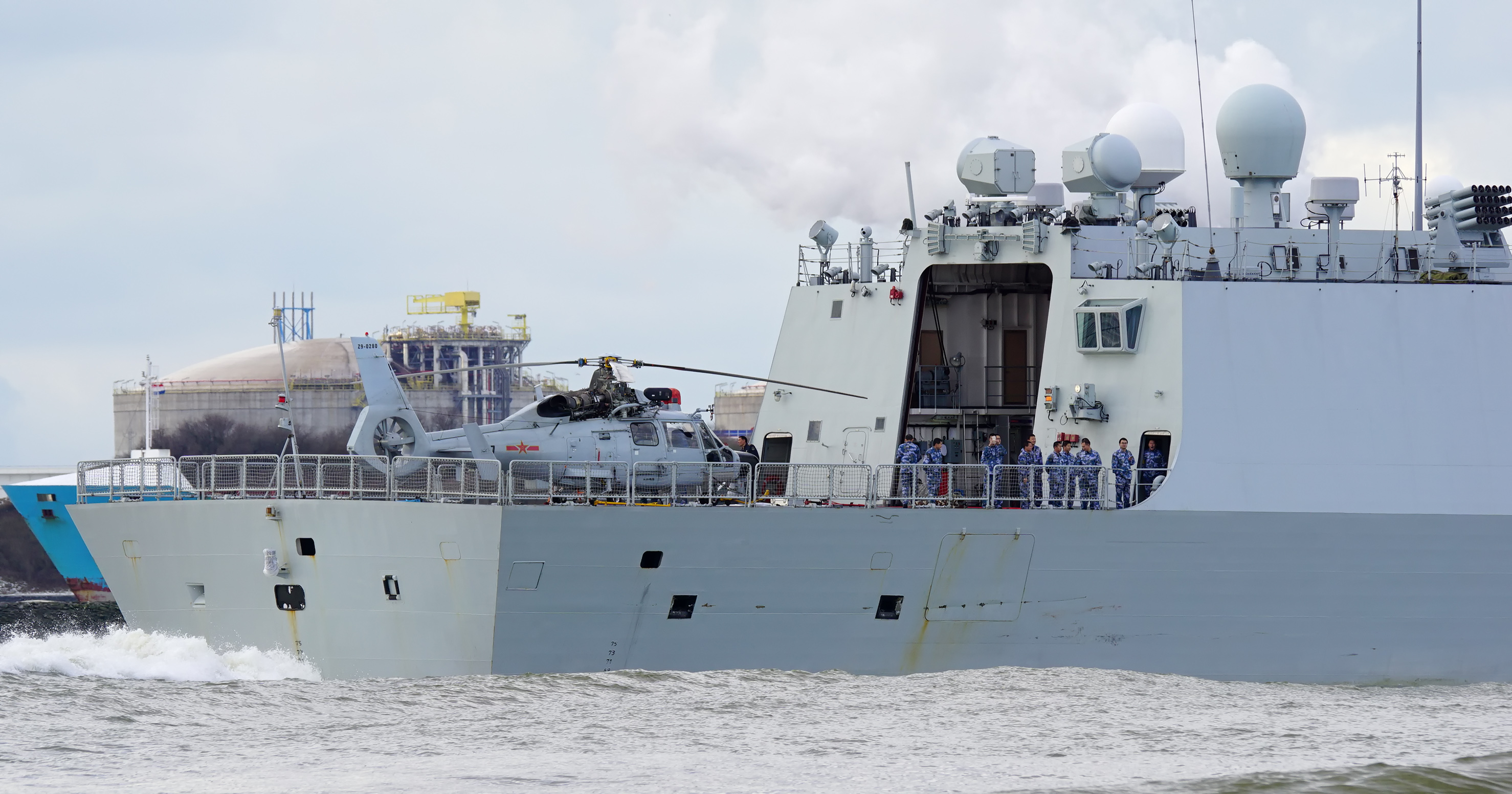
Yuncheng in Rotterdam on 30 January 2015.

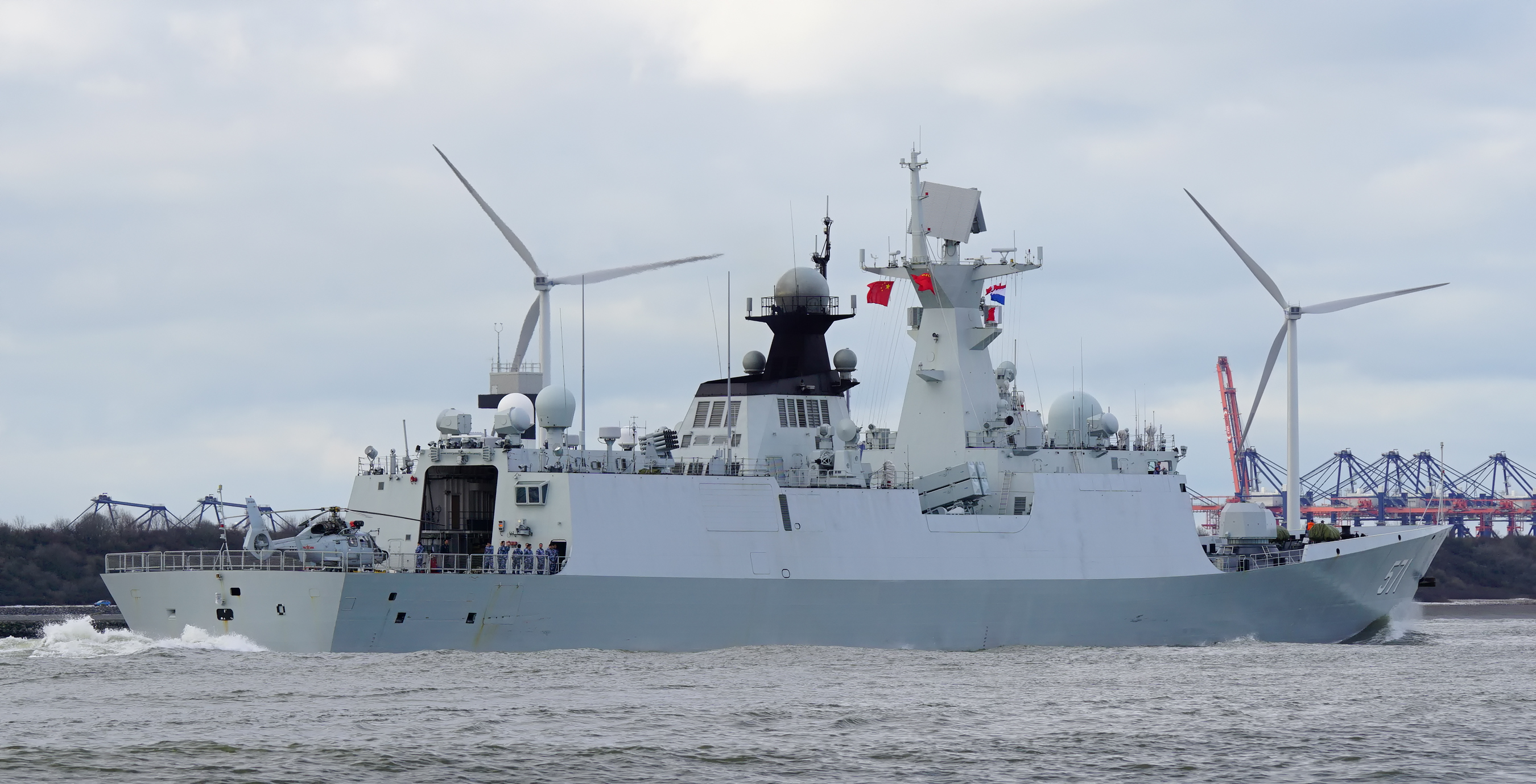
Yuncheng in Rotterdam on 30 January 2015.

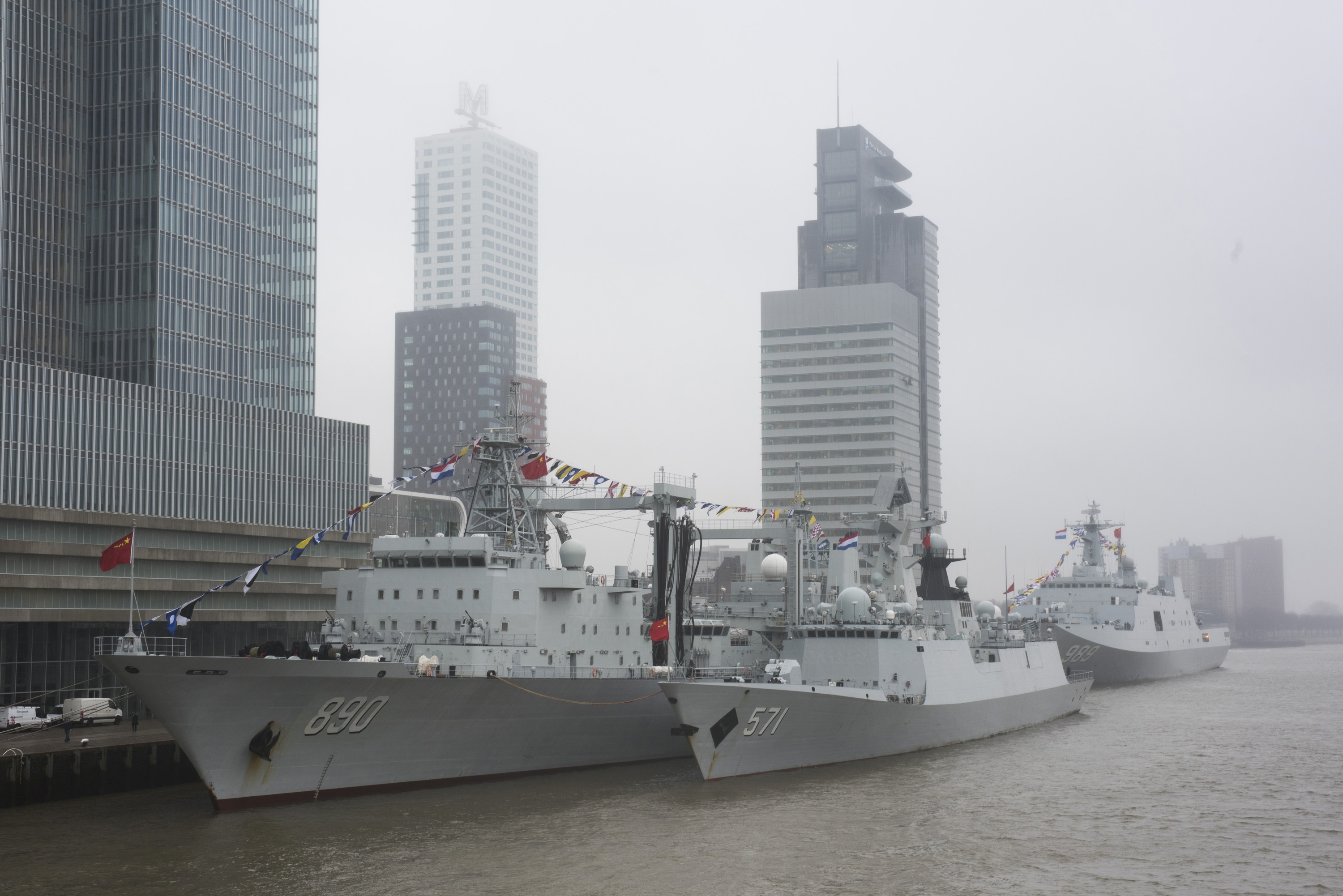
Chaohu, Yuncheng and Changbai Shan in Rotterdam on 26 January 2015.

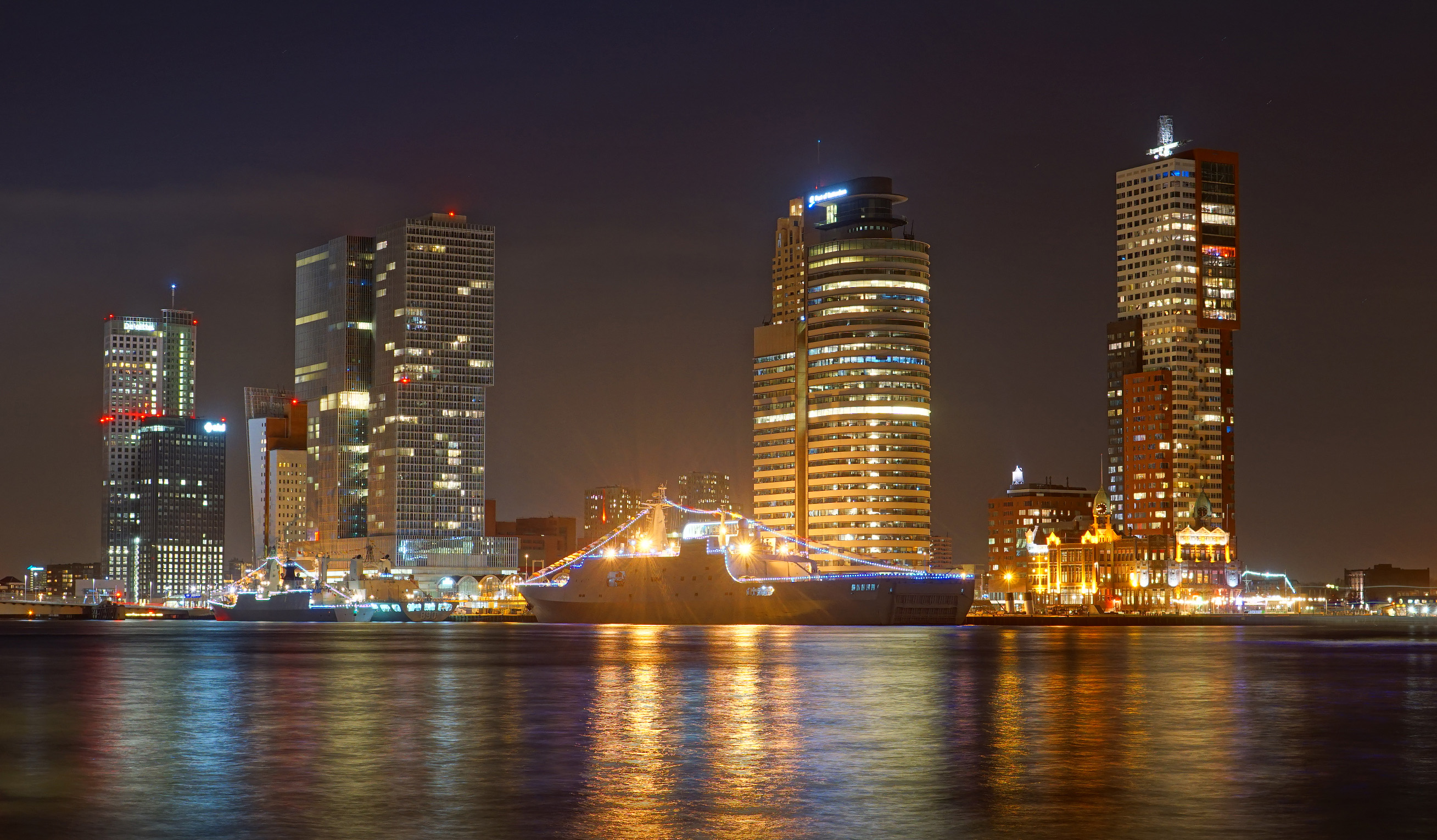
Chaohu, Yuncheng and Changbai Shan in Rotterdam on 26 January 2015.

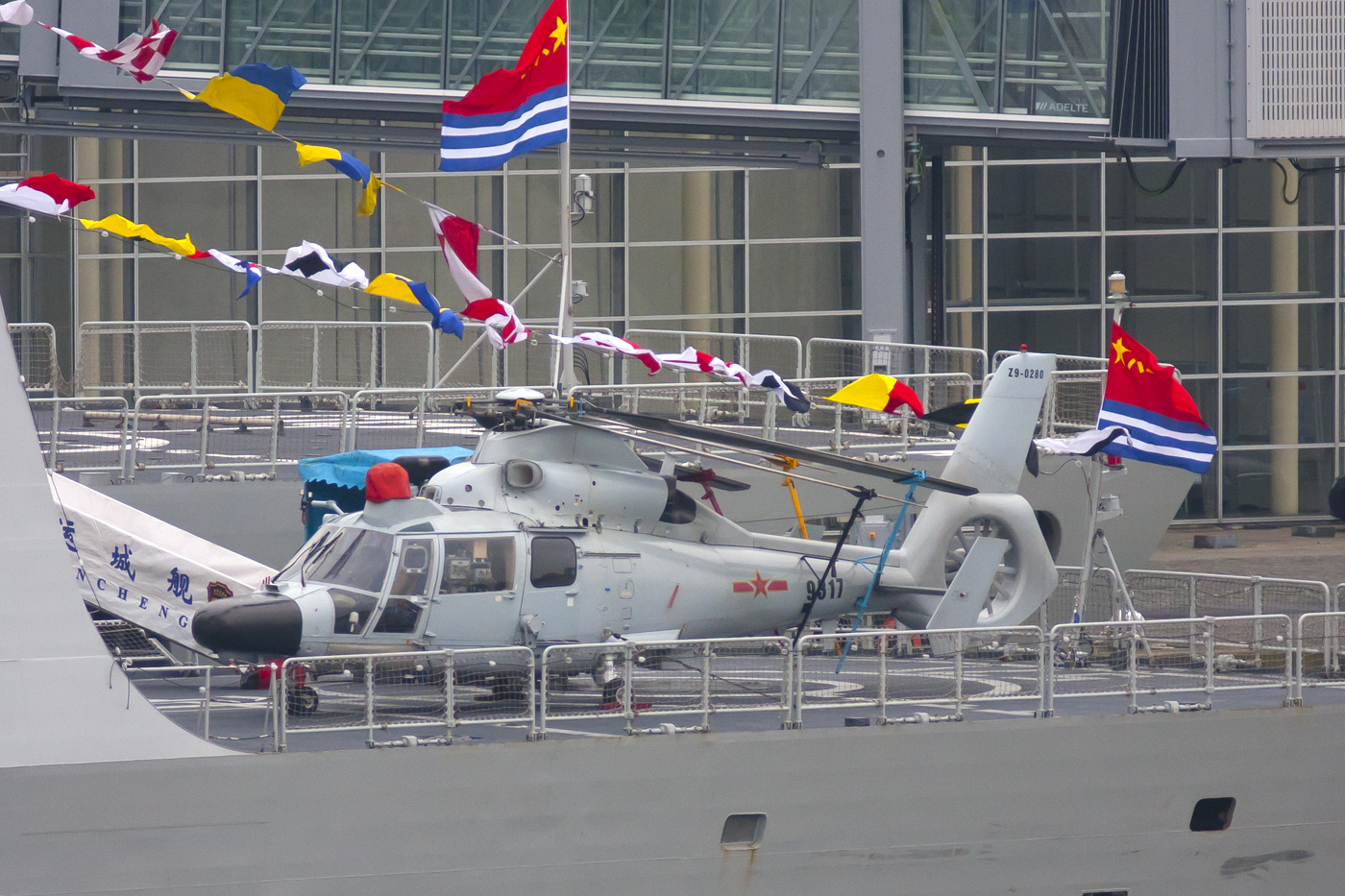
Yuncheng's Harbin Z9C in Rotterdam on 26 January 2015.
