= Chinese frigate Huangshan =

Type 054A frigate of the PLA Navy

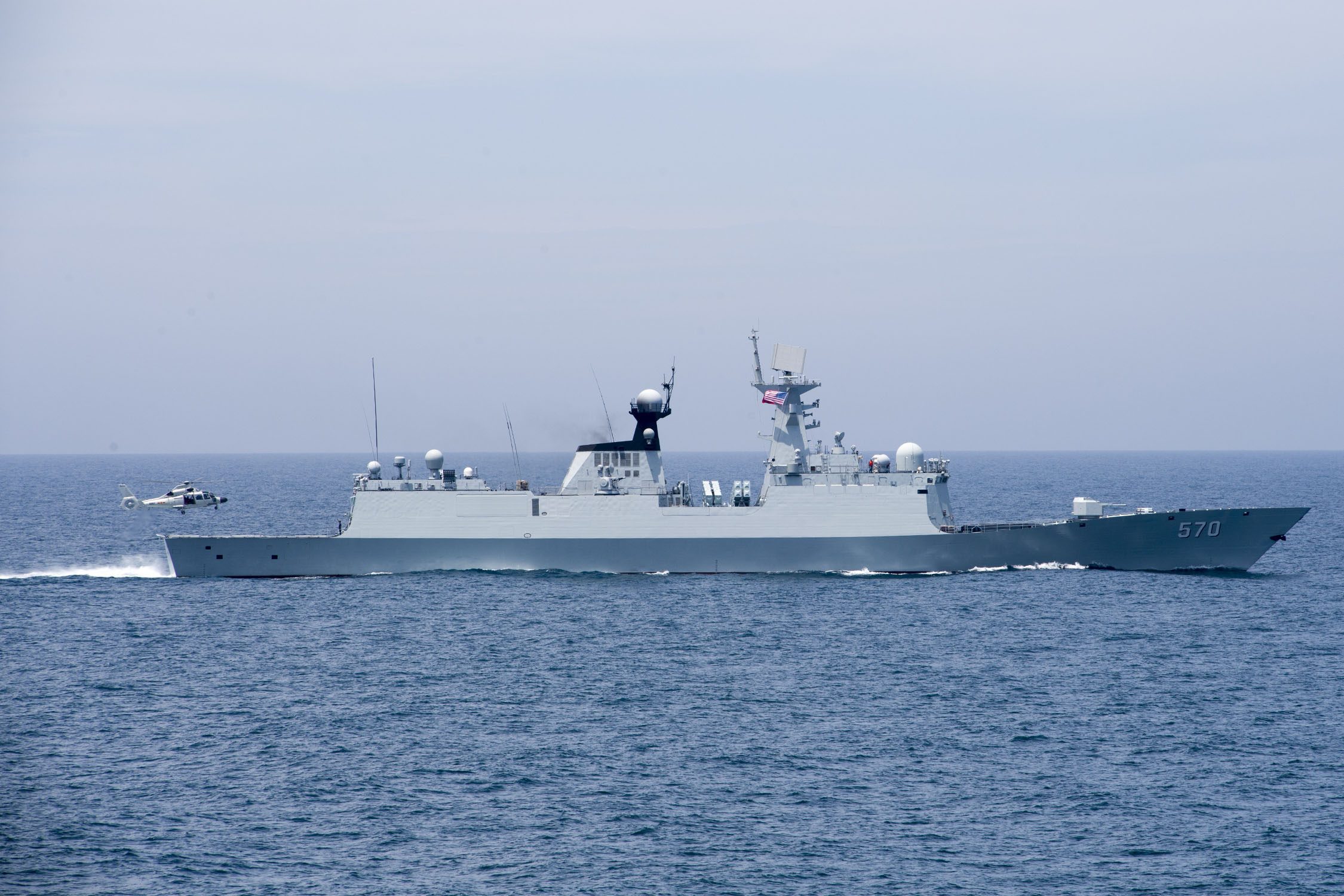
- Huangshan underway on 16 June 2017

History

China
- Name: Huangshan (Chinese: 黄山)
- Namesake: Huangshan; Huangshan City
- Builder: Huangpu, Shanghai
- Laid down: 28 April 2005
- Launched: 18 March 2007
- Commissioned: 13 May 2008
- Identification: Pennant number: 570
- Status: Active

General characteristics
- Class & type: Type 054A frigate
- Displacement: 4,053 tonnes (full)
- Length: 134.1 m (440 ft)
- Beam: 16 m (52 ft)
- Propulsion: CODAD, 4 × Shaanxi 16 PA6 STC diesels, 5700 kW (7600+ hp @ 1084 rpm) each
- Speed: 27 knots estimated
- Range: 8,025 nautical miles (9,235 mi; 14,862 km) estimated
- Complement: 165
- Sensors & processing systems: Type 382 Radar; Type 344 Radar (Mineral-ME Band Stand) OTH target acquisition and SSM fire control radar; 4 × Type 345 Radar(MR-90 Front Dome) SAM fire control radars; MR-36A surface search radar, I-band; Type 347G 76 mm gun fire control radar; 2 × Racal RM-1290 navigation radars, I-band; MGK-335 medium frequency active/passive sonar system; H/SJG-206 towed array sonar; ZKJ-4B/6 (developed from Thomson-CSF TAVITAC) combat data system; HN-900 Data link (Chinese equivalent of Link 11A/B, to be upgraded); SNTI-240 SATCOM; AKD5000S Ku band SATCOM
- Electronic warfare & decoys: Type 922-1 radar warning receiver; HZ-100 ECM & ELINT system; Kashtan-3 missile jamming system
- Armament: 1 × 32-cell VLS; HQ-16 SAM; Yu-8 anti submarine rocket launcher; 2 × 4 C-803 anti-ship / land attack cruise missiles; 1 × PJ26 76 mm dual purpose gun; 2 × Type 730 7-barrel 30 mm CIWS guns or Type 1130; 2 × 3 324mm Yu-7 ASW torpedo launchers; 2 × 6 Type 87 240mm anti-submarine rocket launcher (36 rockets carried); 2 × Type 726-4 18-tube decoy rocket launchers
- Aircraft carried: 1 Kamov Ka-28 'Helix' or Harbin Z-9C
- Aviation facilities: hangar

Huangshan (570) is a Type 054A frigate of the People's Liberation Army Navy. She was commissioned on 13 May 2008 and is a member of the South Sea Fleet.

== Development and design ==
The Type 054A carries HQ-16 medium-range air defence missiles and anti-submarine missiles in a vertical launching system (VLS) system. The HQ-16 has a range of up to 50 km, with superior range and engagement angles to the Type 054's HQ-7. The Type 054A's VLS uses a hot launch method; a shared common exhaust system is sited between the two rows of rectangular launching tubes.

The four AK-630 close-in weapon systems (CIWS) of the Type 054 were replaced with two Type 730 CIWS on the Type 054A. The autonomous Type 730 provides improved reaction time against close-in threats.

== Construction and career ==
Huangshan was laid down on 28 April 2005 and launched on 18 March 2007 at the Huangpu Shipyard in Shanghai. She was commissioned on 13 May 2008.

On April 2, 2009, Huangshan and Shenzhen formed the second escort fleet of the Chinese Navy, which set sail from Zhanjiang City, Guangdong Province, to perform escort missions in the Gulf of Aden and Somali waters. This escort marked the entry of a new phase of orderly succession and normal operation of the Chinese Navy's escort operations. The escort lasted 142 days. Huangshan and others provided regional cover for 85 ships, successfully rescued 4 attacked foreign ships, and verified and driven away 129 suspicious ships. The formation returned to a military port in Zhanjiang City on August 21.

On July 26, 2010, Huangshan, Haikou, and Ningbo conducted a live-firing exercise of multi-arms contract in a certain area of the South China Sea under the organization of the South Sea Fleet. The exercise was carried out in 3 sea areas and more than 18,000 square kilometers of sea area, and 71 missiles of 16 types were launched. It was evaluated as the most complete training elements, the most actual missiles, and the highest degree of information in the history of the PLA Navy at that time. The most complicated joint combat exercise in the electromagnetic environment.

On November 9, 2012, Huangshan, Hengyang, and Qinghaihu formed the 13th Chinese navy escort fleet, which set sail from Zhanjiang Port in Guangdong Province to the Gulf of Aden, Performing escort missions in the waters of Somalia. The escort lasted 196 days and nights. Huangshan and others completed 37 batches of 166 escort missions of Chinese and foreign ships, and verified and driven away suspicious targets at sea in 68 batches and 110 times. After completing the escort mission, the formation visited five countries including Malta, Algeria, Morocco, Portugal and France, and returned to a military port in Zhanjiang on May 23, 2013.

On October 18, 2013, Huangshan and Guangzhou set sail to participate in the navy's "Mobile-5" open sea exercises, and went to the western Pacific waters to perform sea-to-air three-dimensional offensive and defensive exercises and joint anti-submarine warships task. The exercise lasted for 15 days and ended on November 1, 2013. All participating troops returned to the station one after another. On December 19, the South Sea Fleet consisting of Huangshan, Yuncheng, and Weishanhu set sail from Zhanjiang City and proceeded to the Western Pacific and other waters. Exercises in subjects such as continuous maritime alert, counter-terrorism and counter-piracy, and joint search and rescue.

On February 17, 2014, Huangshan and others performed the Syrian chemical weapons maritime escort mission to replace the force from a military port in Zhanjiang City, Guangdong Province, and went to the Mediterranean to replace Yancheng, which has completed three batches of Syrian chemical weapons maritime escort missions. After completing 13 escort missions with ships from Russia, Denmark, Norway and other countries, Huangshan returned to a military port in Zhanjiang City on July 24 after completing the Syrian chemical weapons maritime escort mission. On December 29, 2014, Huangshan sailed to Indonesian waters to participate in the search and rescue operation of Indonesian AirAsia Flight 8501.

== Gallery ==
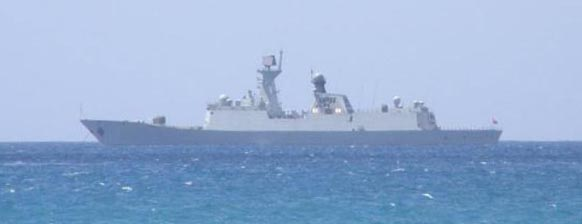
Huangshan off Nanhai on 16 August 2007.

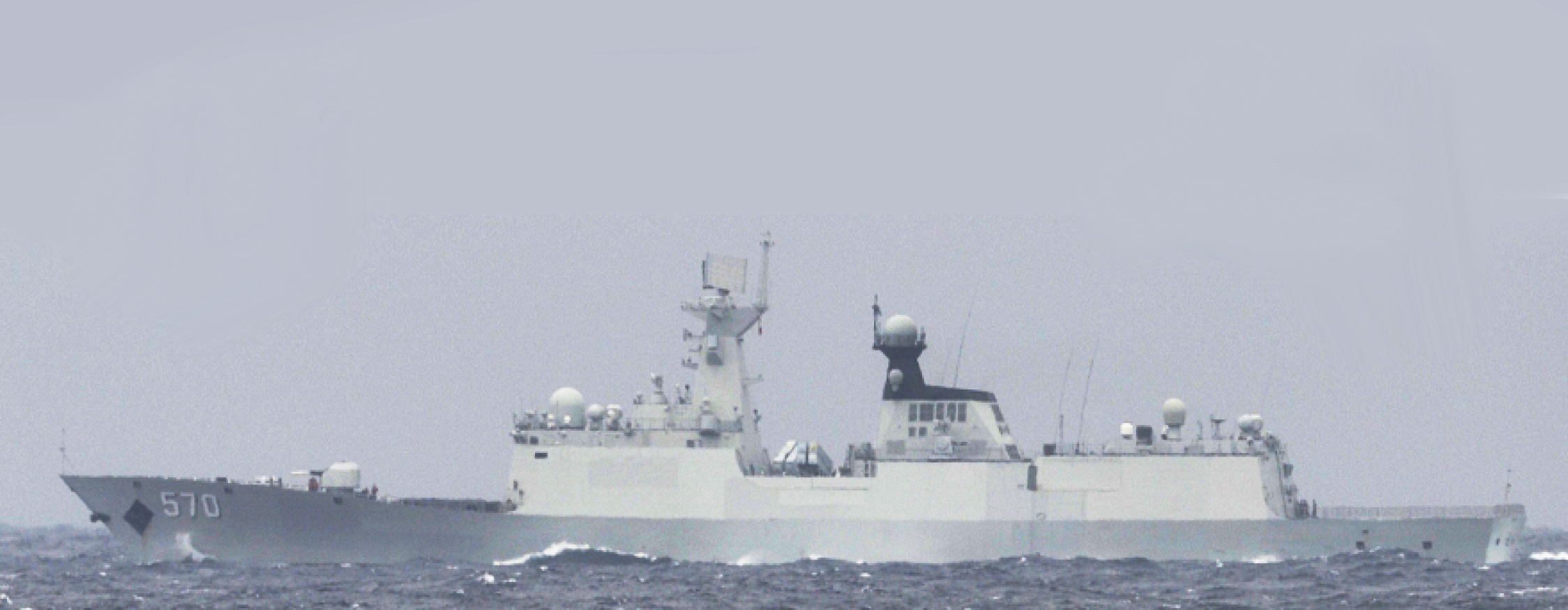
Huangshan underway on 23 December 2013.

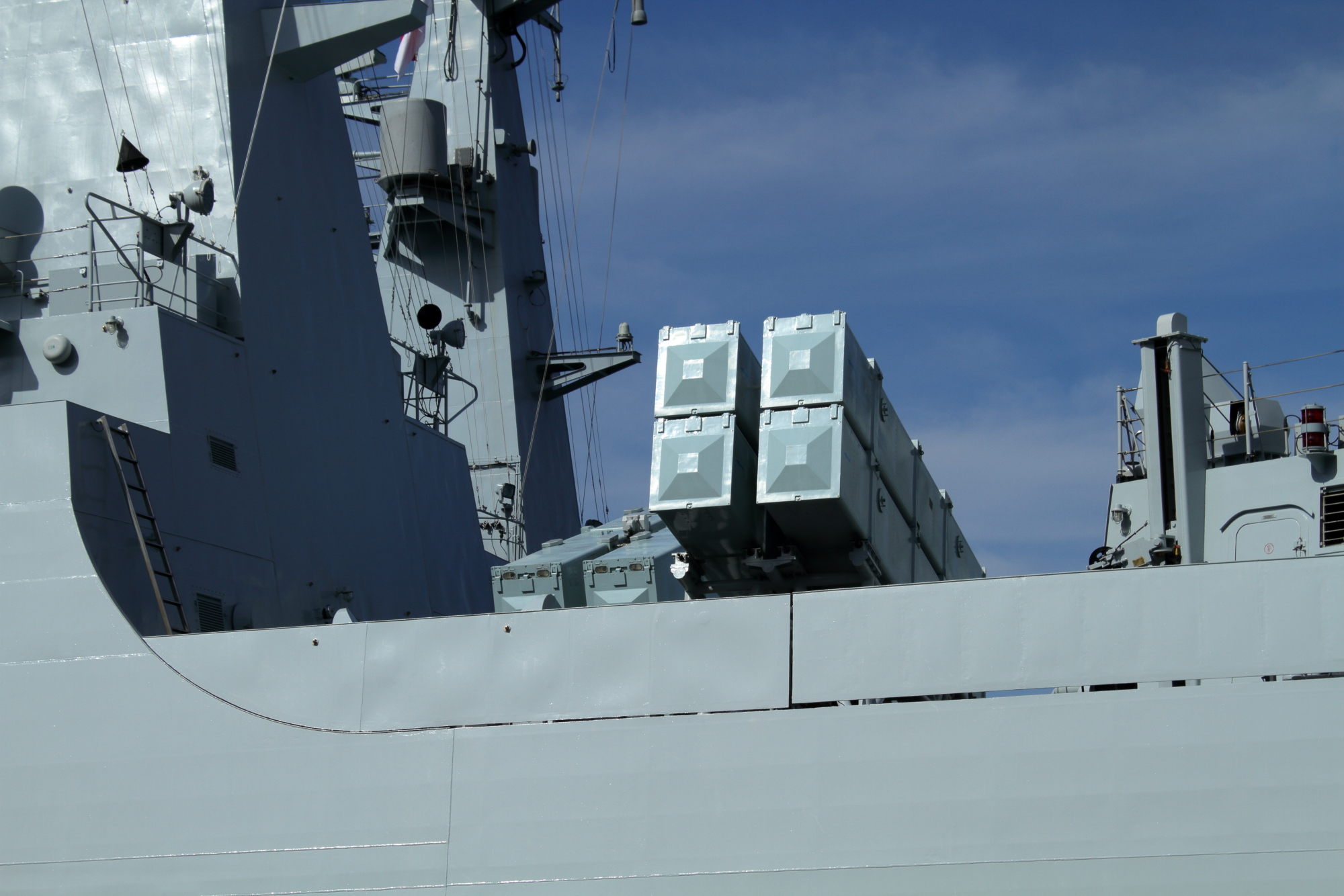
Huangshan's YJ-83 on 16 May 2017.
