= YJ-62 =

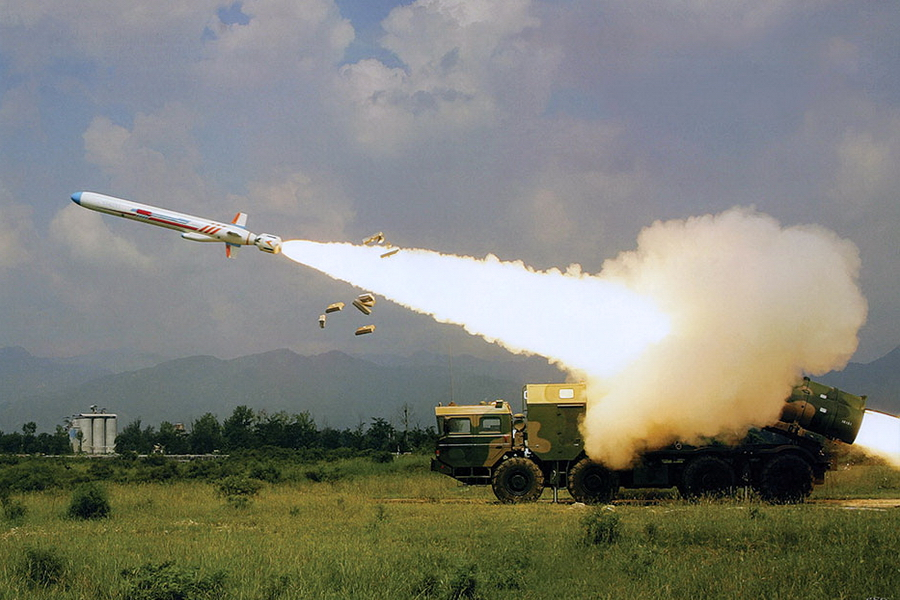
- YJ-62 launched from a transporter erector launcher.
- Type: Anti-ship cruise missile Land-attack cruise missile
- Place of origin: People's Republic of China

Service history
- In service: Prior to 2005 – present
- Used by: People's Liberation Army Navy; Pakistan Navy

Production history
- Manufacturer: China Aerospace Science and Industry Corporation
- Produced: Prior to 2005

Specifications
- Mass: 1,350 kg (2,980 lb) (with booster); 1,140 kg (2,510 lb) (missile only)
- Length: 7 m (23 ft) (with booster); 6.1 m (20 ft) (missile only)
- Diameter: 0.28 m (11 in)
- Wingspan: 2.9 m (110 in)
- Warhead: 210 kg (460 lb) (YJ-62); 300 kg (660 lb) (C-602); 480 kg (1,060 lb) (CM-602G)
- Detonation mechanism: Semi-armor-piercing
- Engine: Turbojet
- Operational range: 400 km (220 nmi) (YJ-62); 280 km (150 nmi) (C-602); 290 km (160 nmi) (CM-602G)
- Flight altitude: 7–10 m (23–33 ft) (terminal)
- Maximum speed: Mach 0.6-0.8
- Guidance system: Inertial/active terminal guidance
- Launch platform: Surface ship/TEL-launched

The YJ-62 (Chinese: 鹰击-62; pinyin: yingji-62; lit. 'eagle strike 62') is a Chinese subsonic land-attack and anti-ship cruise missile. It is manufactured by the China Aerospace Science and Industry Corporation Third Academy.

== Description ==
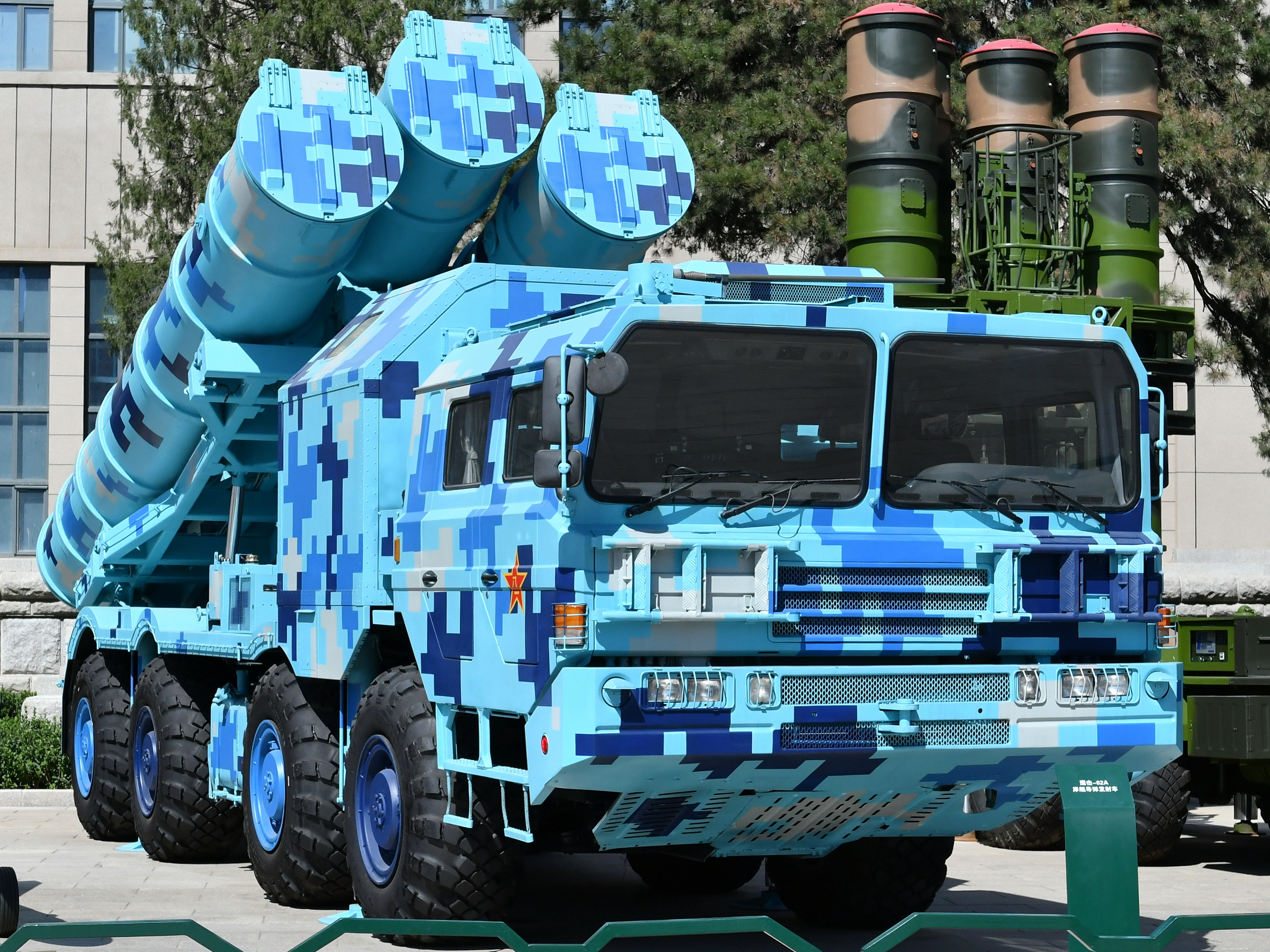
YJ-62A on a TA580/TAS5380

In a September 2014 article published in Joint Forces Quarterly, the YJ-62 is credited with a 210 kg (460 lb) warhead, a speed of Mach 0.6 – Mach 0.8 (735–980 km/h; 457–609 mph), and a sea-skimming terminal attack height of 7–10 m (23–33 ft); The missile has an inertial guidance system using GPS and BeiDou data, and an active terminal sensor. A 2017 China Maritime Studies Institute (CSMI) report credits the active radar seeker with an acquisition range of 22 nautical miles (41 km).

In 2015, the United States Navy's Office of Naval Intelligence considered the YJ-62 to have longer range than the 150 nautical miles (170 mi; 280 km) of the C-602 export version, Figures of at least 400 km have been given. The 2017 CSMI report notes that such long range suggests that the missile receives targeting from other platforms. YJ-62A is credited with a range of up to 400 km (250 mi; 220 nmi).

=== C-602 ===
The C-602 is the export version of the YJ-62, claimed to have a range of 280 km, a 300 kg (660 lb) semi-armour-piercing warhead, and GPS guidance. The reduced range is in accordance with Missile Technology Control Regime restrictions.

The C-602 was revealed in September 2005, and displayed outside of China for the first time at the African Aerospace and Defence exhibition in 2006.

=== CM-602G ===
The CM-602G is a land-attack version of the C-602. It is advertised as having a range of 290 km (180 mi), a 480 kg (1,060 lb) penetrating blast/fragmentation warhead, and an inertial guidance system using GPS data which may be augmented to provide man-in-the-loop control.

The missile was revealed at the China International Aviation & Aerospace Exhibition in 2012.

== Variants ==
YJ-62
Original variant.
YJ-62A
Extended range variant.
C-602
Export variant.
CM-602G
land-attack version of the C-602.
Zarb
Pakistani variant of the C-602.

== Operators ==
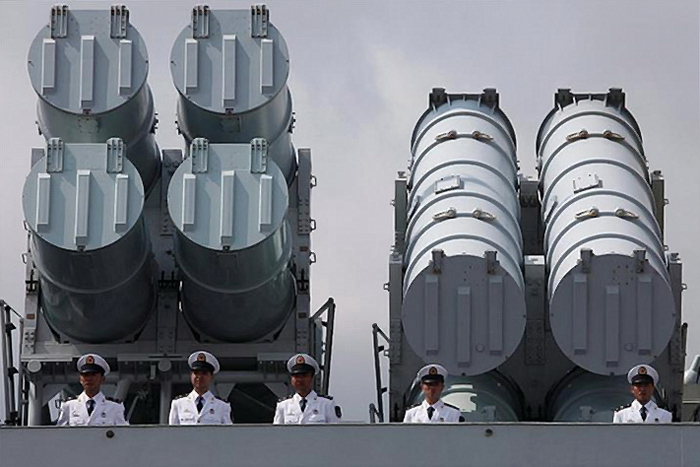
Launchers on the Type 052C destroyer Haikou in 2012.

China

- People's Liberation Army Navy
  - Type 052C destroyer
- People's Liberation Army Navy Coastal Defense Force: 120+ as of 2012

Pakistan

- Pakistan Navy: Zarb used for coastal defense

== Sources ==
- The International Institute for Strategic Studies (2025). The Military Balance 2025. London: Routledge. ISBN 978-1-041-04967-8.

== See also ==
- CJ-10 cruise missile - Similar land-attack cruise missile operated by the PLA Second Artillery Corps, unveiled in 2009
