= Chinese landing ship Changbai Shan =

Type 071 amphibious transport dock

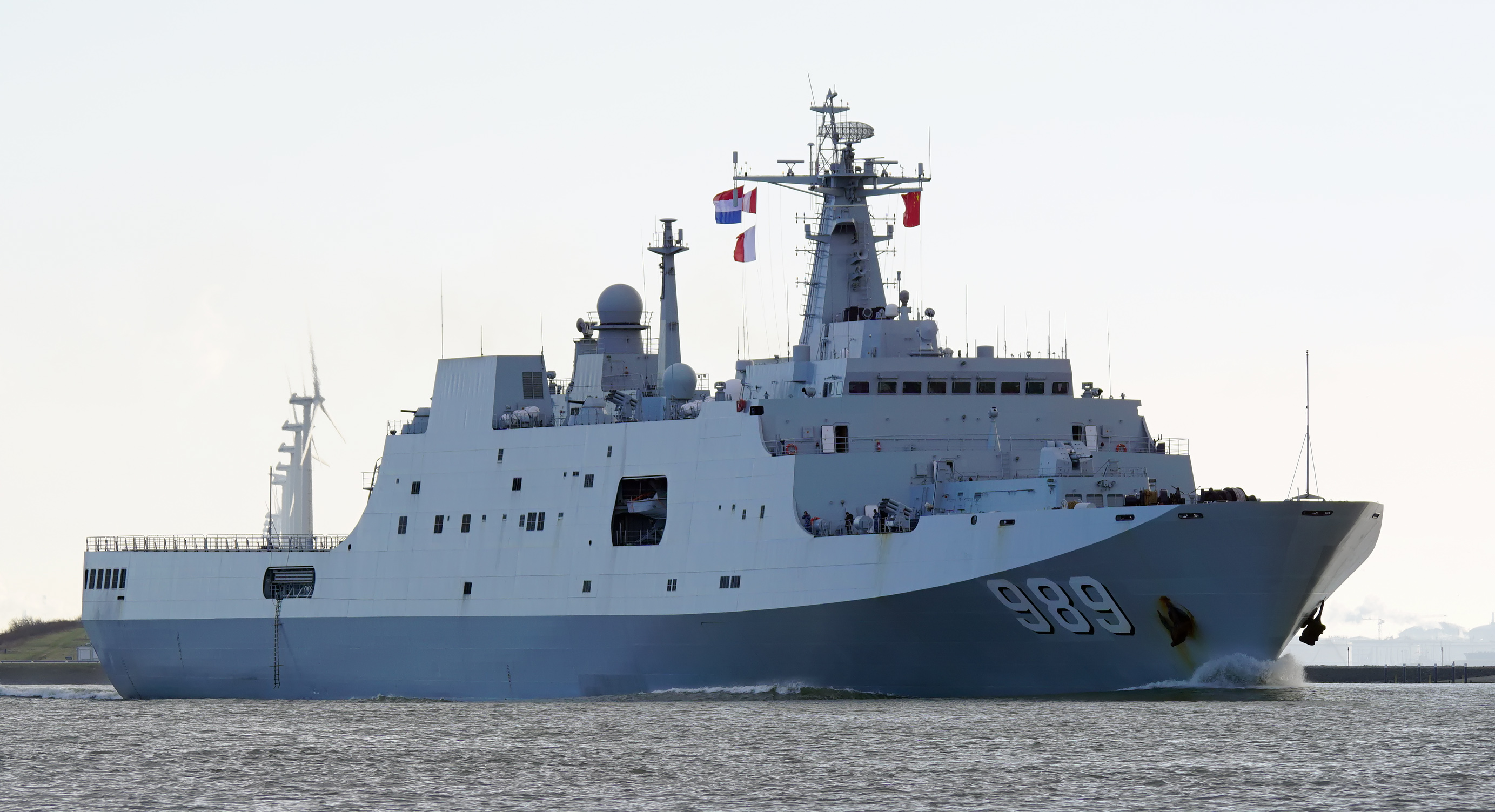
- Changbai Shan in Rotterdam on 30 January 2015

History

China
- Name: Changbai Shan; (长白山)
- Namesake: Changbai Mountains
- Builder: Hudong-Zhonghua Shipyard, Shanghai
- Launched: 26 September 2011
- Commissioned: 23 September 2012
- Identification: Pennant number: 989
- Status: Active

General characteristics
- Class & type: Type 071 amphibious transport dock
- Displacement: 25,000 tons full load.
- Length: 210 m (689 ft 0 in)
- Beam: 28 m (91 ft 10 in)
- Draft: 7 m (23 ft 0 in)
- Speed: 25 knots (46 km/h; 29 mph)
- Range: 10,000 nmi (19,000 km) at 18 knots (33 km/h; 21 mph)
- Boats & landing craft carried: 4 × Type 726 Yuyi class LCAC; Landing craft on port/starboard davits
- Capacity: Vehicles
- Troops: 600–800 troops
- Armament: 1 × AK-176 76 mm (3.0 in) gun; 4 × AK-630 30 mm (1.2 in) CIWS; 4 × 18-tube Type 726-4 decoy/chaff launcher; Possible installation of 2–4 heavy machine guns (Fitted for but not with)
- Aircraft carried: 4 × Z-8 Super Frelon
- Aviation facilities: Hangar and helipad

Changbai Shan (989) is a Type 071 amphibious transport dock of the People's Liberation Army Navy.

== Development and design ==
Type 071 integrated landing ship (NATO code name: Yuzhao-class) is a large dock landing ship of the Chinese People's Liberation Army Navy. It can be used as the mother ship of the air cushion landing craft to transport soldiers, infantry fighting vehicles, main battle tanks, etc. for landing operations. It can also carry amphibious vehicles, the hangar can accommodate 4 helicopters, and the deck can be used for two helicopters to take off and land.

The amphibious warfare ship features a vehicle deck, well-deck, landing deck and a hangar. It can carry a combination of marines, vehicles, landing craft and helicopters. The ship may embark 600 to 800 troops. The stern helicopter deck offers two landing spots for supporting the operations of two Z-8 (SA 321 Super Frelon) transport helicopters. The twin-door cantilever hangar can house up to four Z-8 helicopters. The well deck houses up to four Type 726 air-cushioned landing craft, which can transfer vehicles or marines to the shore at high speed. The LCAC are launched by flooding of the docking area. The vessel can also carry landing craft on port / starboard davits. The vehicle deck can house amphibious assault vehicles including the ZBD05 amphibious IFV and the ZTD-05 amphibious light tank. The stern ramp, two side doors and ramps allow rapid loading of the vehicles and equipment.

The ship is armed with one 76 mm gun and four 30 mm close-in weapon systems.

The Type 071 may operate as the flagship of a task force. the Type 071 may also conduct and support humanitarian, disaster relief, and counterpiracy missions, in addition to amphibious assaults.

== Construction and career ==
She was launched on 26 September 2011 at Hudong-Zhonghua Shipyard in Shanghai and commissioned on 23 September 2012 into the South Sea Fleet.

From January to February 2015, Changbai Shan and Yuncheng and Chaohu of the 18th Gulf of Aden escort fleet visited Britain, France, Germany, and the Netherlands. On 12 January, the formation visited the Portsmouth Naval Port in the United Kingdom. The British Daily Mail reported on this on 13 January: "Three huge warships entered the Royal Navy's home in the amazement of the crowd, but unfortunately they are Chinese warships, not British". On 26 January, the formation arrived at the Port of Rotterdam in the Netherlands. They were the first Chinese navy ship to paid an official visit to the Netherlands for the first time in 43 years since the establishment of diplomatic relations between China and the Netherlands. During the docking period, a local lady asked: "Which country do you rent such a large warship? Or built it yourself?" In August 2015, Changbai Shan with other ships went to Vladivostok, Russia to participate in the "Maritime Joint-2015 (II)" Sino-Russian military exercise. On 25 August, the joint landed in Russia's Peter the Great Bay began a battle. According to the pictures taken by the media, Changbai Shan released 14 amphibious marine combat vehicles, carrying 150 marines to attack the target tidal flat position.

On 15 May 2016, Changbai Shan went to Thailand to participate in the one-month "Blue Assault 2016" Sino-Thai Marine Corps joint training.

On 9 February 2021, the 37th escort group which consists of Yinchuan, Hengyang, Chaganhu, Wuzhi Shan and Tianshuxing participated in the Annual High Sea Joint Training Exercises.

== Gallery ==
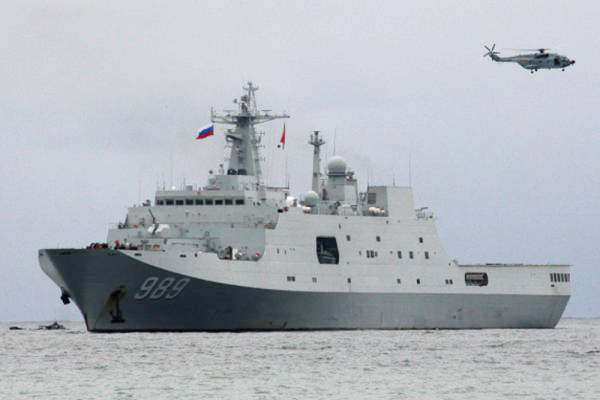
Changbai Shan in Portsmouth on 11 January 2015.

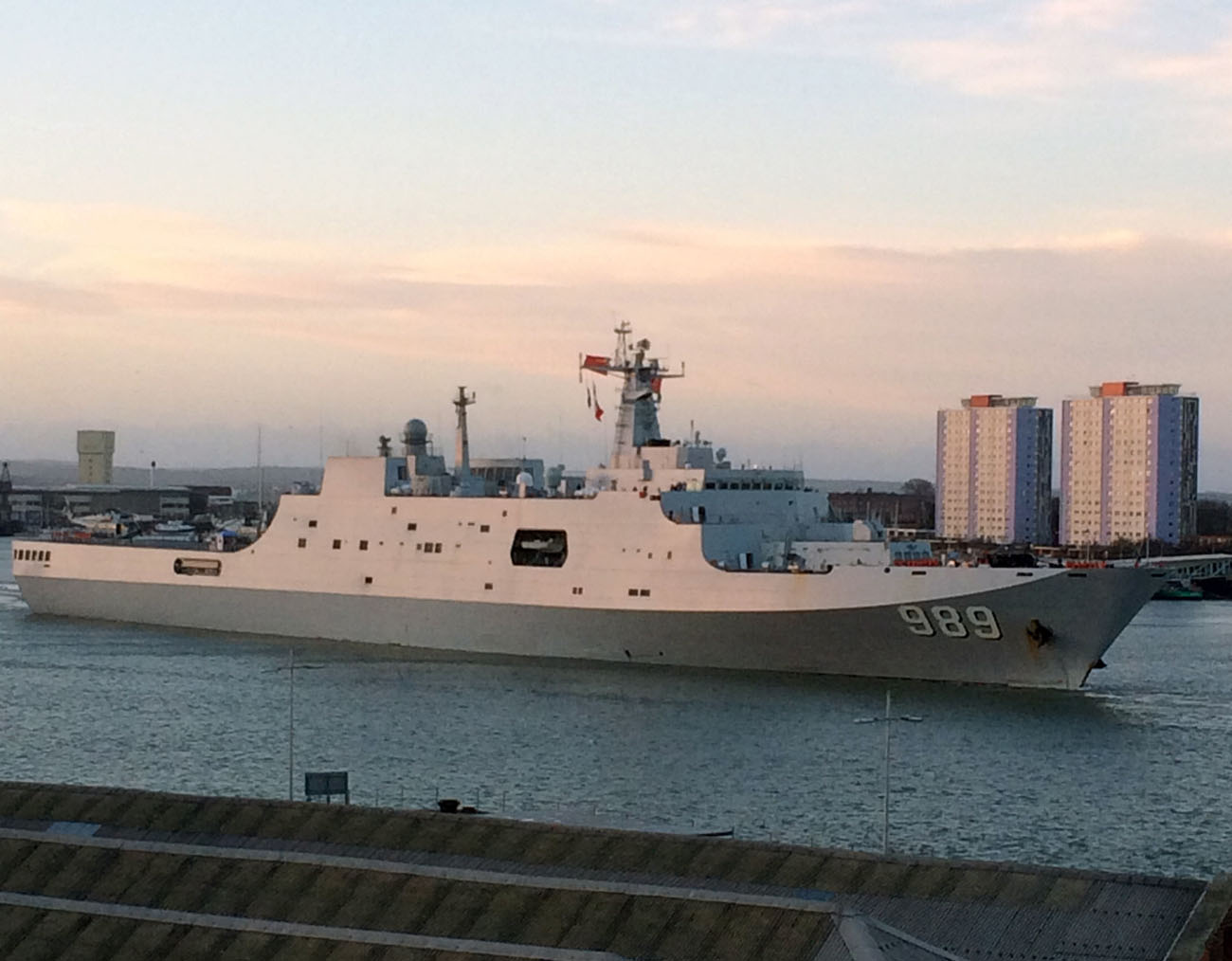
Changbai Shan in Portsmouth on 11 January 2015.

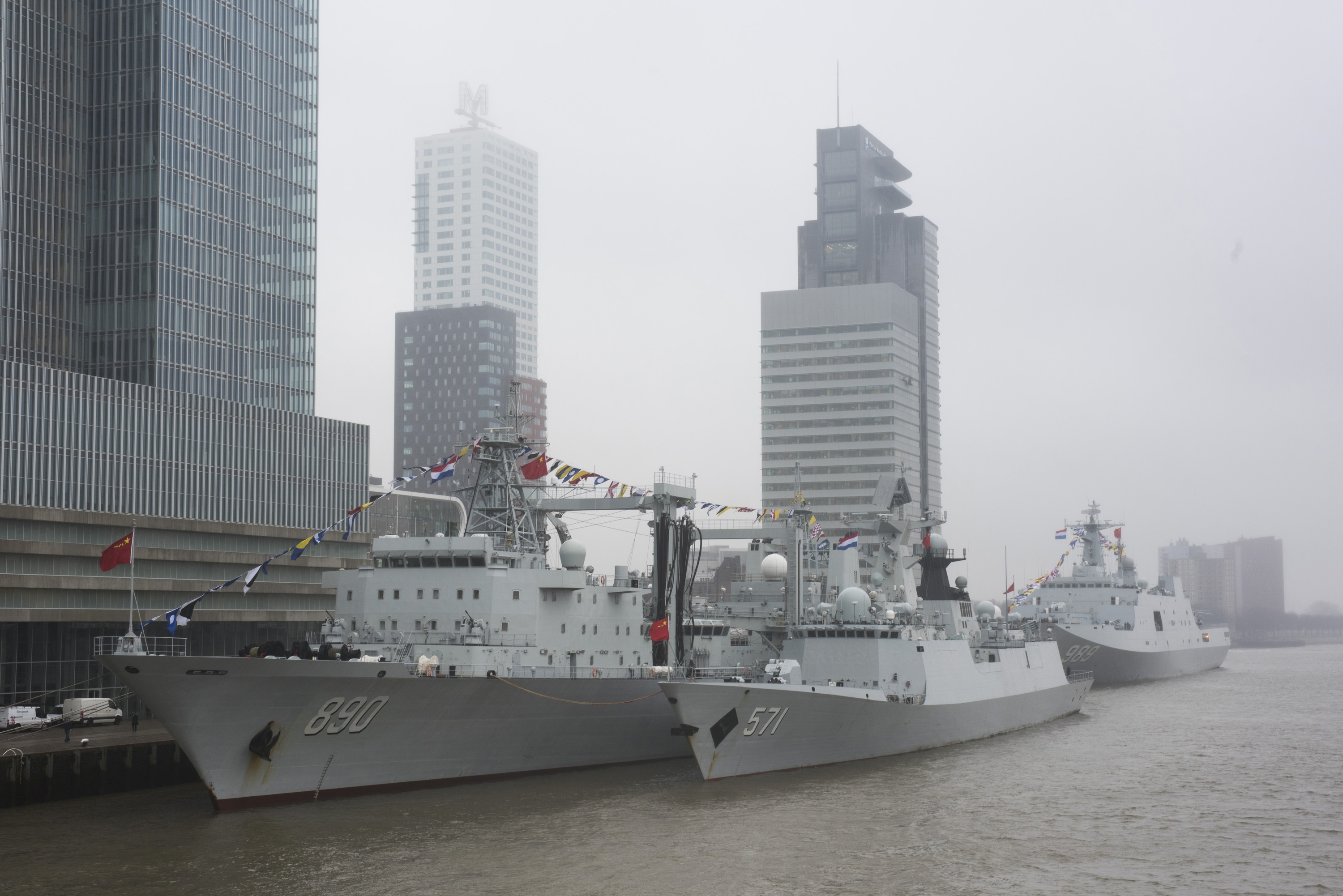
Chaohu, Yuncheng and Changbai Shan in Rotterdam on 26 January 2015.

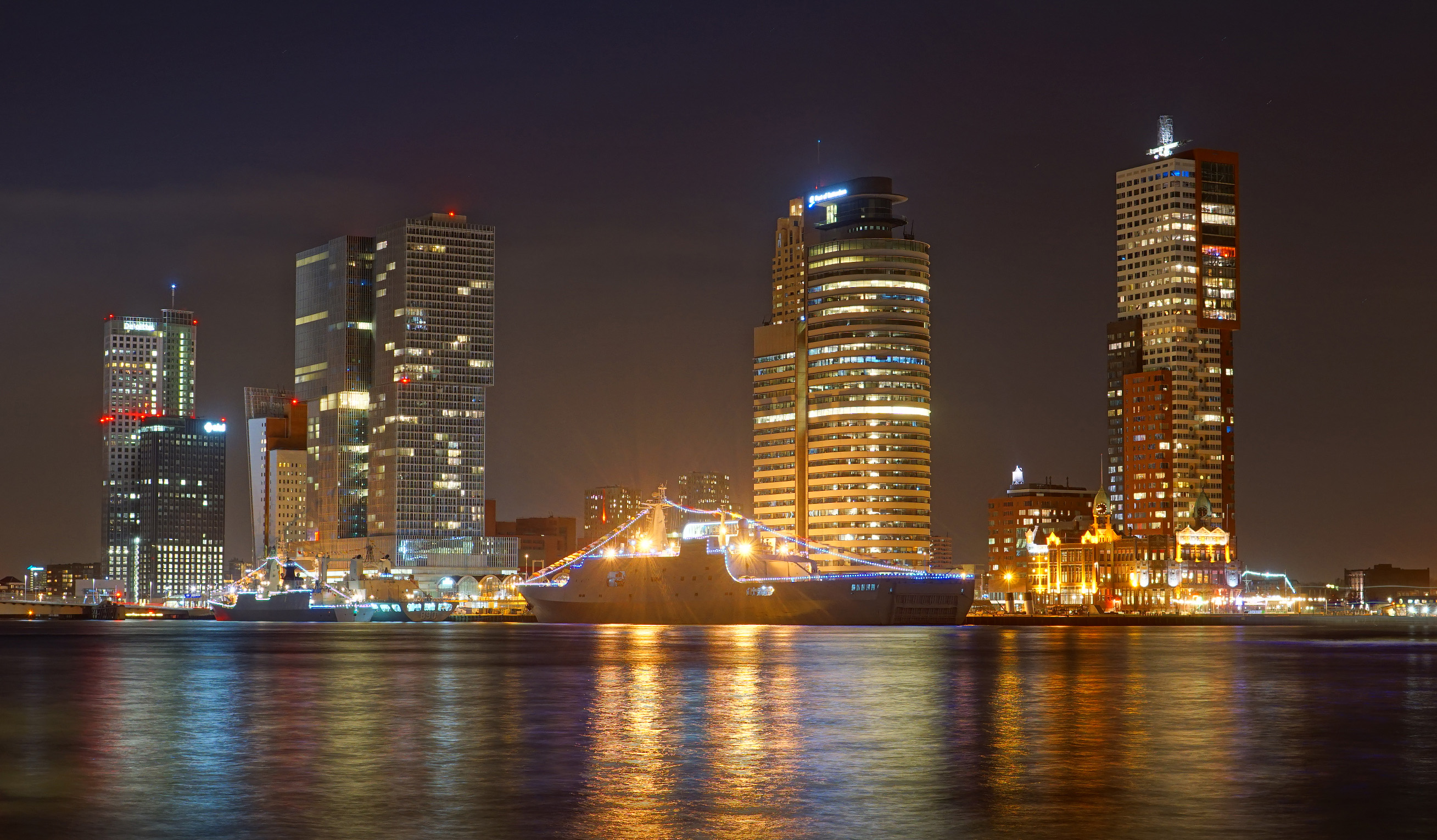
Chaohu, Yuncheng and Changbai Shan in Rotterdam on 26 January 2015.

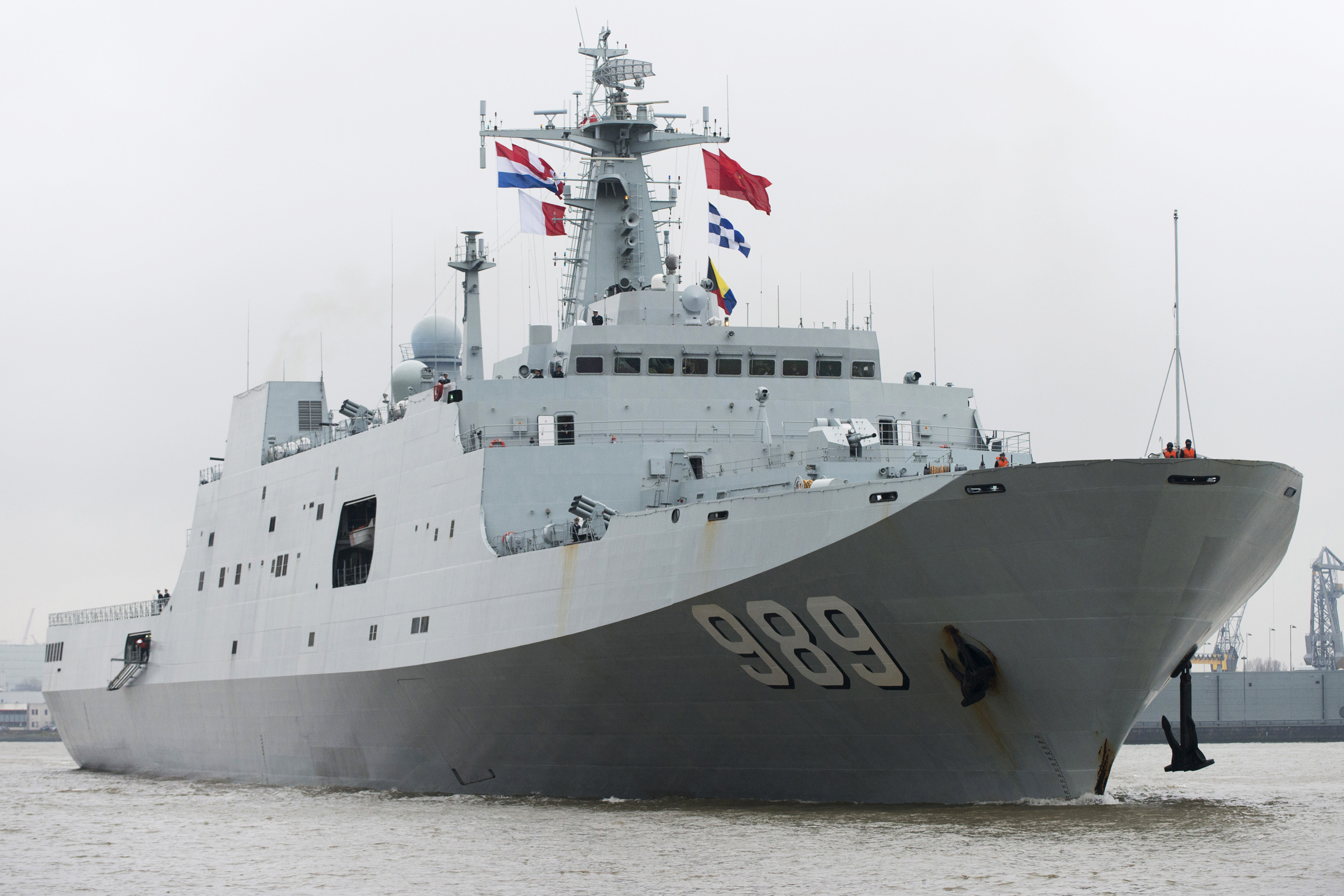
Changbai Shan in Rotterdam on 30 January 2015.

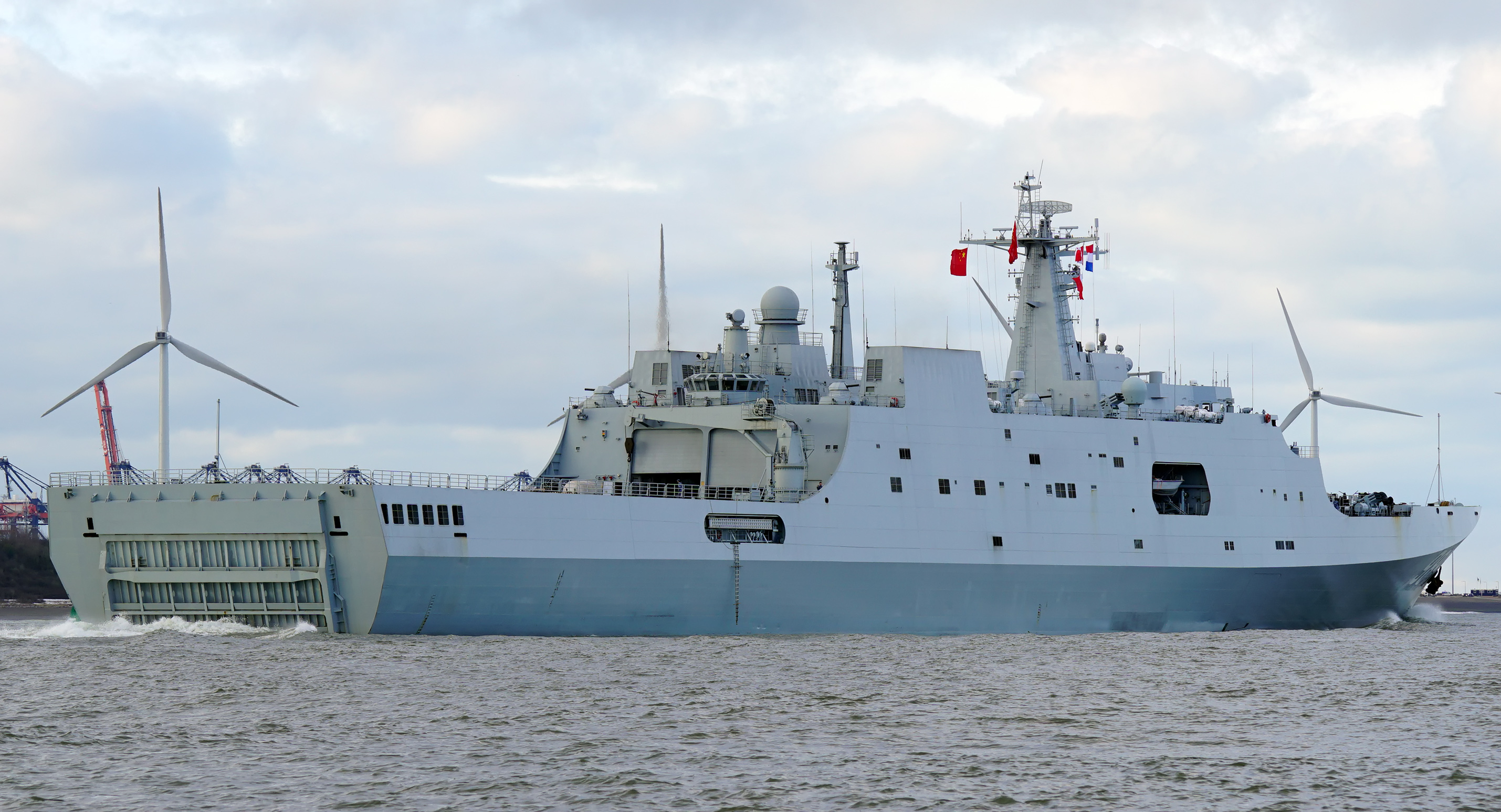
Changbai Shan in Rotterdam on 30 January 2015.

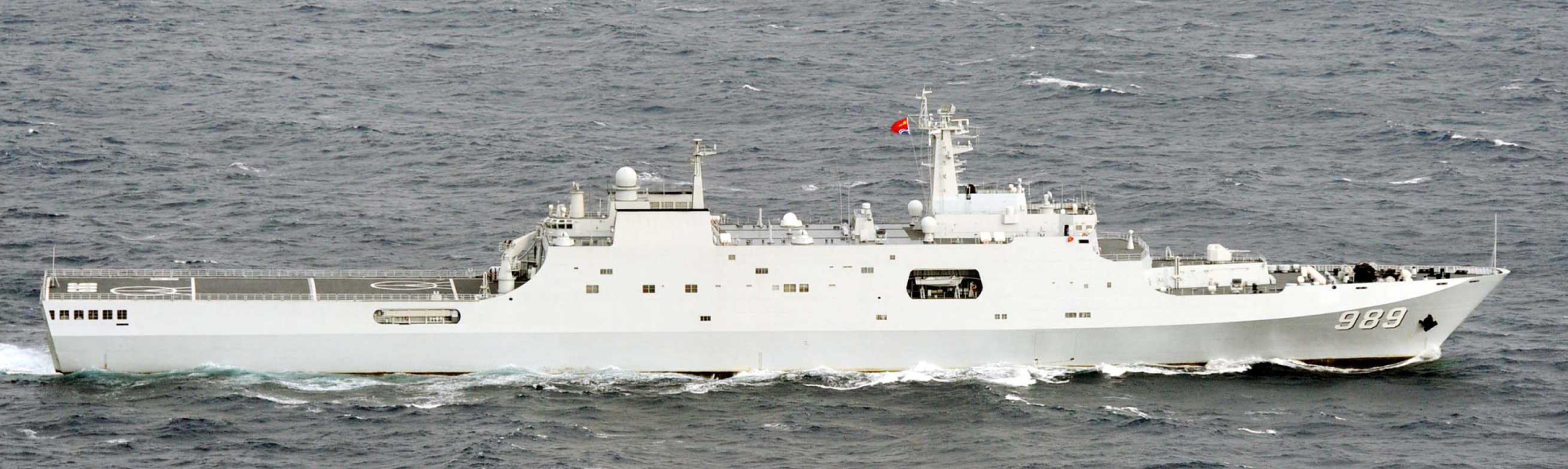
Changbai Shan underway on 17 August 2015.

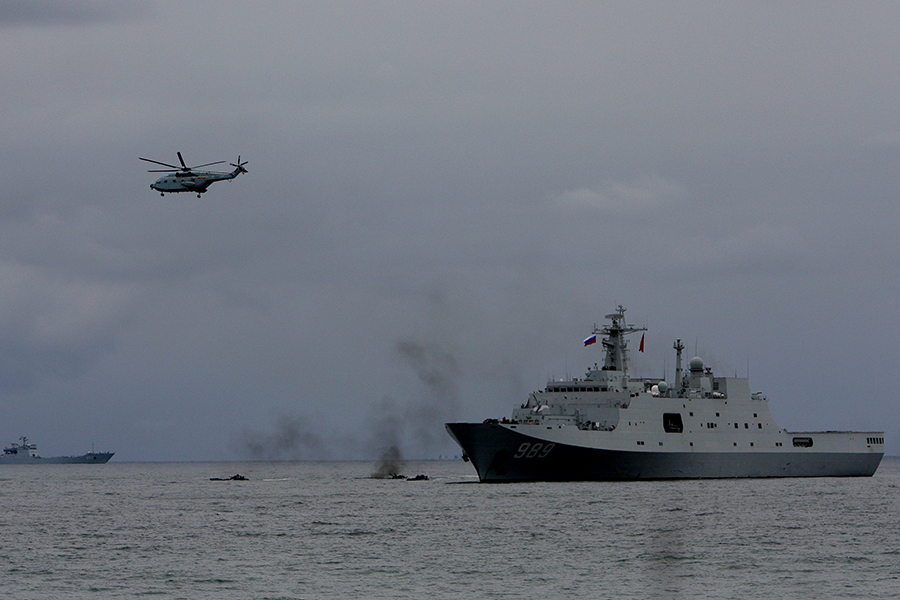
Changbai Shan in Russia on 24 August 2015.

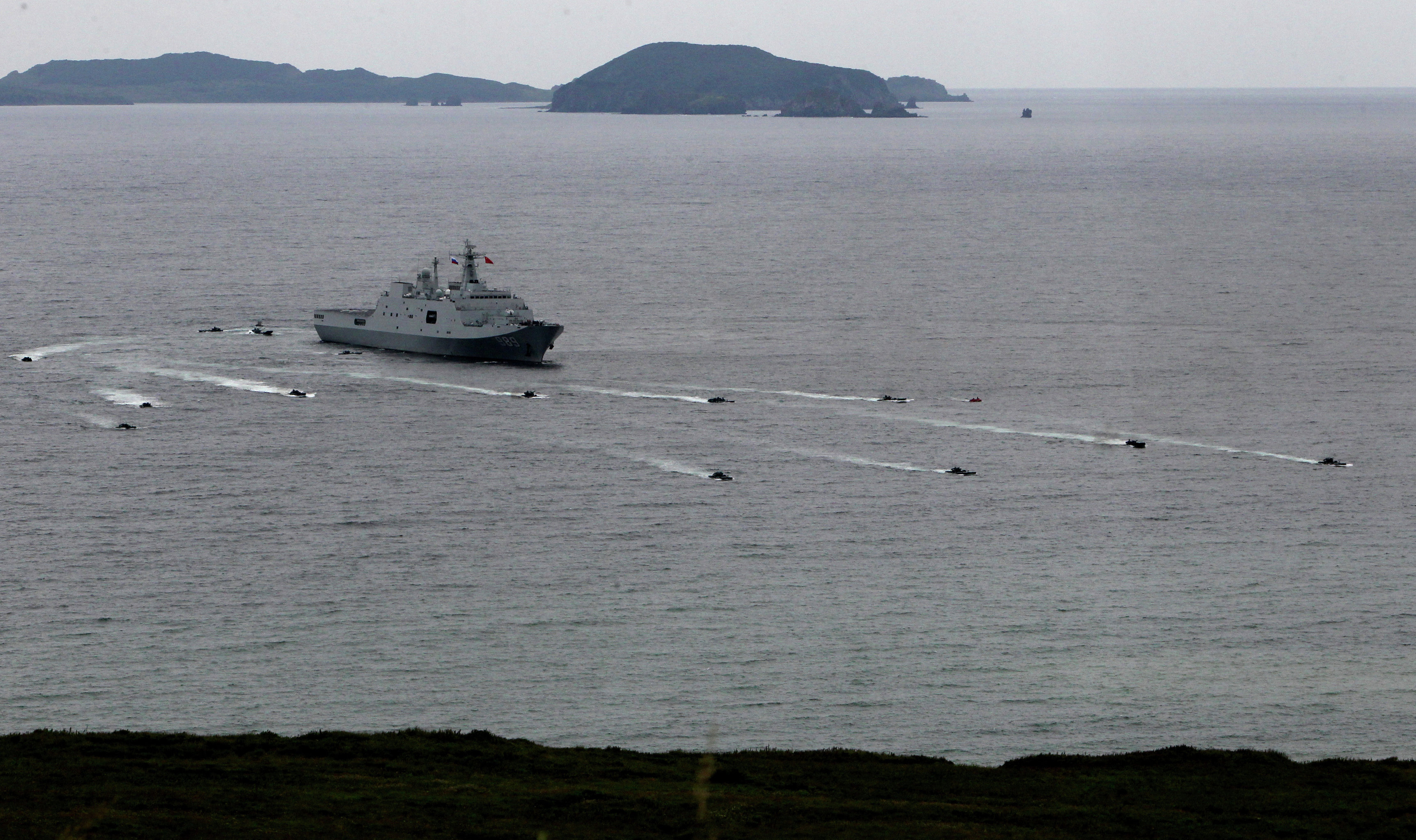
Changbai Shan in Russia on 24 August 2015.

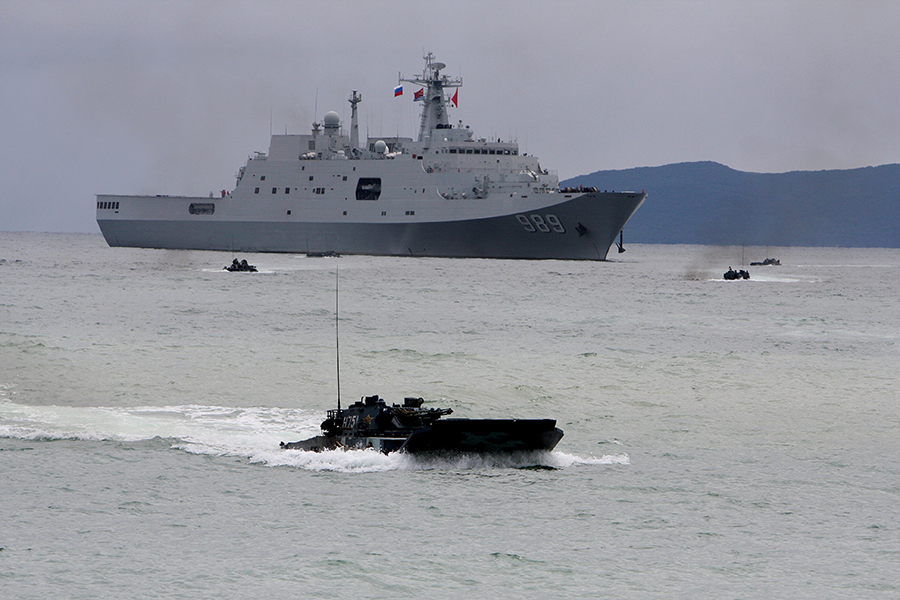
Changbai Shan in Russia on 24 August 2015.

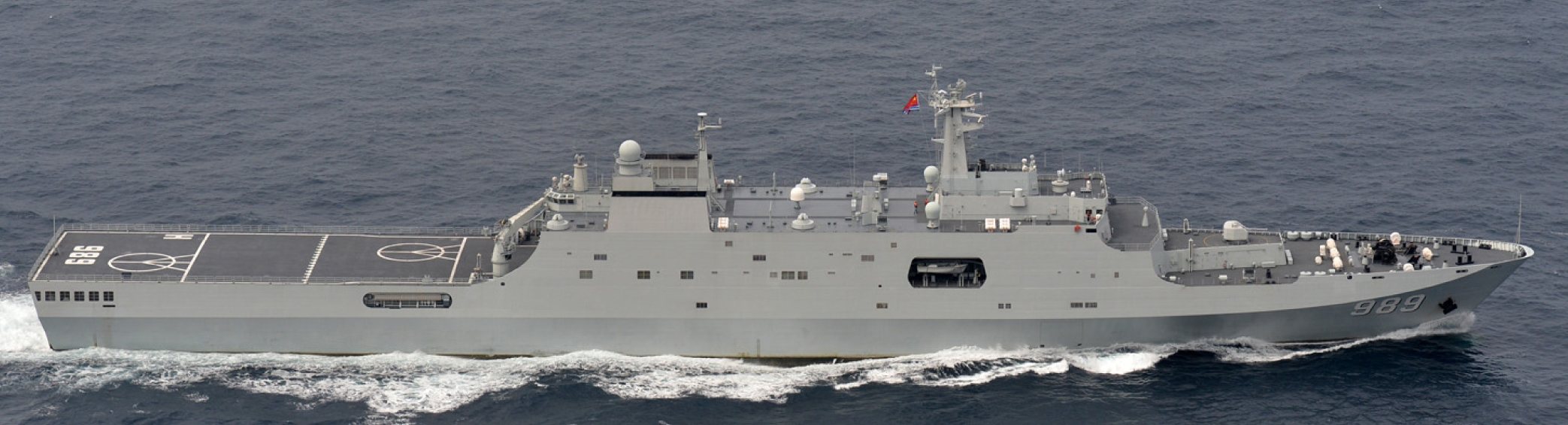
Changbai Shan underway on 29 August 2015.

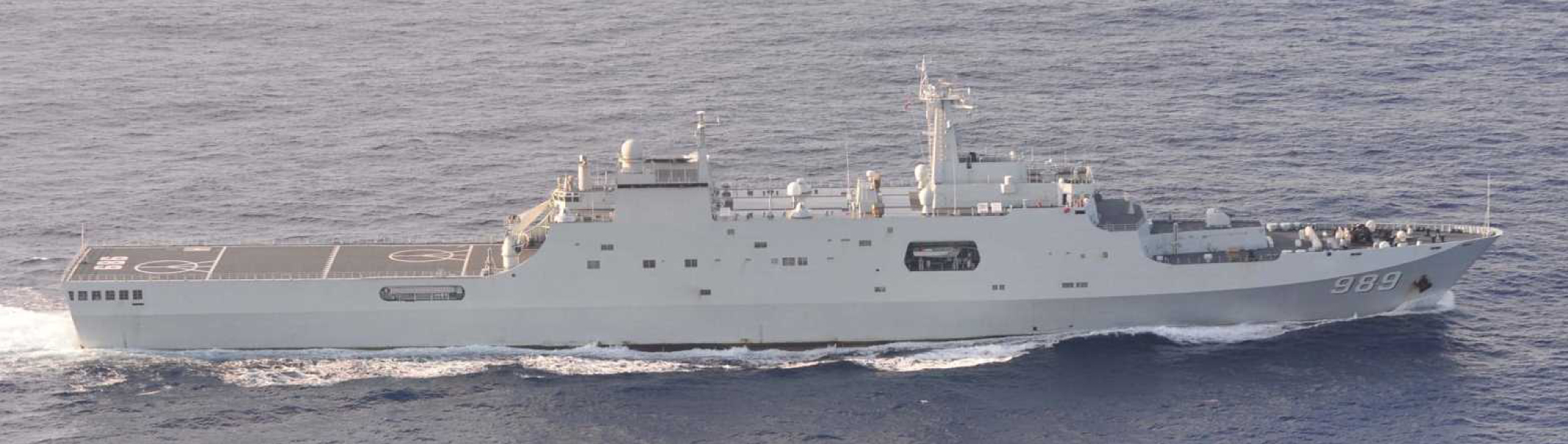
Changbai Shan underway on 11 September 2015.
