= Chinese destroyer Haikou =

Chinese navy ship

Haikou
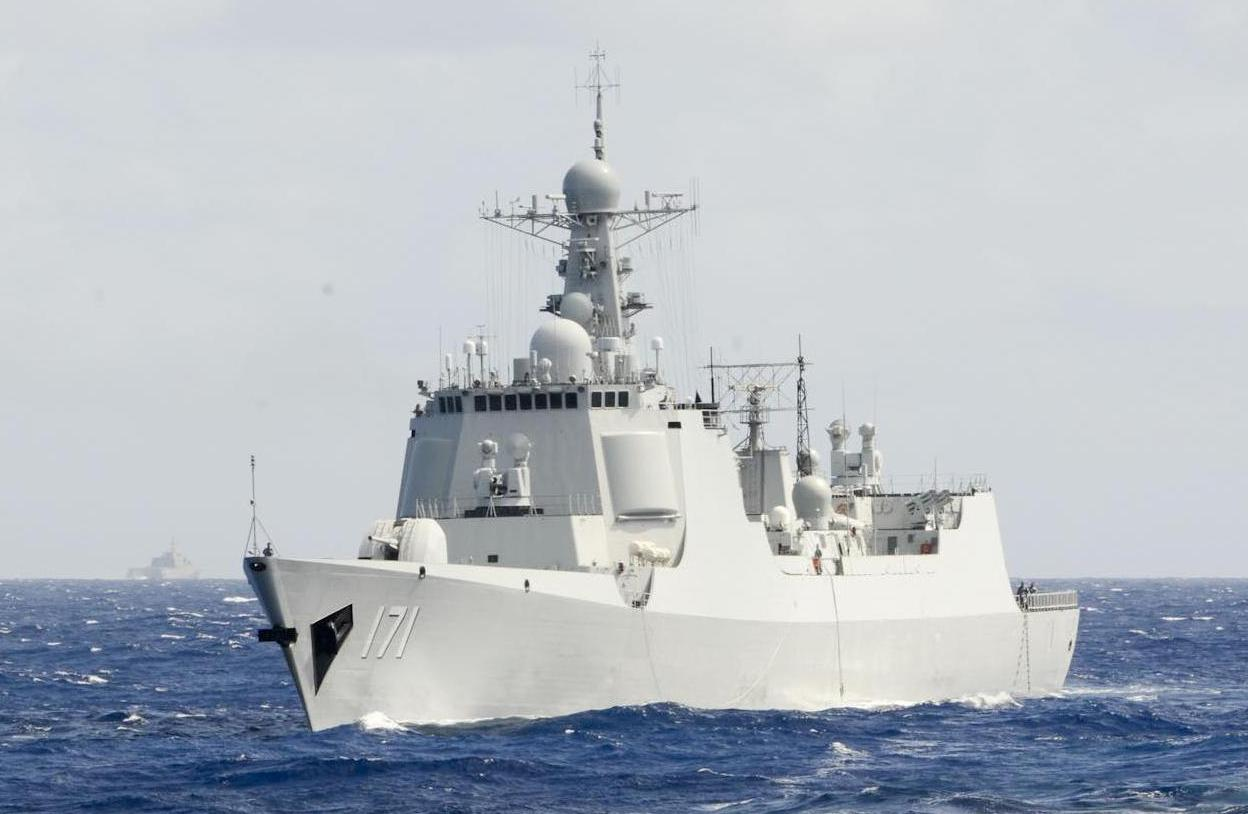
- Haikou at the RIMPAC exercise in 2014

History

China
- Name: Haikou
- Laid down: 30 June 2001
- Launched: 30 October 2003
- Commissioned: 26 December 2005
- Status: in active service

General characteristics
- Displacement: 7,000 tons
- Length: 154 m (505 ft)
- Beam: 17 m (56 ft)
- Draught: 6 m (20 ft)
- Propulsion: CODOG, 57,000 shp
- Speed: 30 knots (56 km/h; 35 mph)
- Armament: 48 HHQ-9 long-range surface-to-air missiles; 8 YJ-62 anti-ship / land attack cruise missiles; 1 × 100 mm dual-purpose gun; 2 × 30 mm Type 730 close-in weapons systems; 6 torpedo tubes; 4 × 18-tube decoy rocket launcher
- Aircraft carried: 1 helicopter: Kamov Ka-27 or Harbin Z-9C ASW/SAR

Haikou is a Chinese Type 052C destroyer (NATO code name Luyang II class). The ship was laid down in 2002, launched on 30 October 2003, and commissioned in late 2005. The destroyer is active with the People's Republic of China's South Sea Fleet.

== History ==
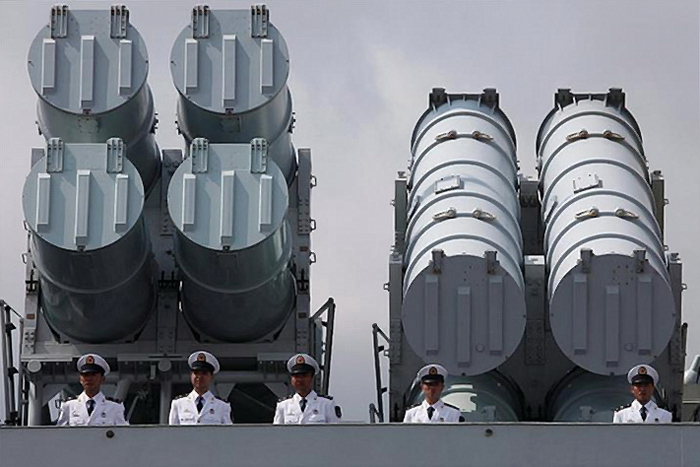
Chinese sailors standing next to Haikou's anti-ship missile launchers in 2012.

In December 2008, Haikou, Type 052B destroyer Wuhan, and Type 903 replenishment ship Weishan Hu were deployed to the Gulf of Aden; this was China's first overseas naval deployment in 600 years.

On 2 November 2011, Haikou and Type 054A frigate Yuncheng were deployed as tenth Escort Task Group for anti-piracy operation in Somalia and the Gulf of Aden. The task group was to be relieved by the eleventh task group on 17 March 2012.

On 9 March 2014, Haikou was deployed in the search for the missing Malaysia Airlines Flight 370.
