= List of military vehicles =

Military vehicles include land combat and transport vehicles, excluding rail-based, designed for or are in significant use by military forces throughout the world from pre-World War II to the present.

See also list of armoured fighting vehicles.

== # ==
- 0-10 Light tank (Soviet Union; pre–World War II)
- 10TP light cruiser prototype (Poland; pre–World War II)
- 14TP medium cruiser prototype (Poland; pre–World War II)
- 1V152 8×8 command and forward observation vehicle based on the BTR-80 (Soviet Union; Cold War/modern)
- 20/25TP medium tank concept (Poland; pre–World War II)
- 2K22 Tunguska Soviet tracked Self-propelled Anti-Aircraft Weapon (Soviet Union; Cold War/modern)
- 2S1 Gvozdika self propelled 122 mm howitzer (also known as M1971 and M1974) (Soviet Union; Cold War)
- 2S3 Akatsiya self-propelled 152 mm howitzer (also known as M1973) (Soviet Union; Cold War)
- 2S4 Tyulpan self-propelled 240 mm mortar (also known as M1975) (Soviet Union; Cold War)
- 2S5 Giatsint-S self-propelled 152 mm howitzer (also known as M1981) (Soviet Union; Cold War/modern)
- 2S7 Pion self-propelled 203 mm gun (also known as M1975) (Soviet Union; Cold War)
- 2S9 Anona self-propelled 120 mm mortar (Soviet Union; Cold War/modern)
- 2S14 Zhalo-S 8×8 self-propelled 85 mm anti-tank gun based on the BTR-70 (Soviet Union; Cold War/modern)
- 2S15 Norov self-propelled 100 mm anti-tank gun based on the 2S1. (Soviet Union; Cold War)
- 2S19 Msta self-propelled 152 mm howitzer (Soviet Union; Cold War/modern)
- 2S23 Nona-SVK 8×8 self-propelled 120 mm mortar based on the BTR-80 (Soviet Union; Cold War/modern)
- 2S30 Iset self-propelled 155 mm howitzer (Soviet Union; modern)
- 2S31 Vena self-propelled 120 mm mortar based on the BMP-3 (Soviet Union; modern)
- 40.10 4×4 utility vehicle (also known as LSVW and Torpedo) produced by Iveco (Italy; Cold War/modern)
- 4K 4FA armoured vehicle (Austria; Cold War)
- 4TP light tank prototype (Poland; pre–World War II)
- 7TP light tank (Poland; World War II)
- 9A51 Prima 6×6 self-propelled multiple rocket launcher based on a ZIL-131 chassis (Soviet Union; Cold War)
- 9P117 8×8 transport/launcher of the Scud short-range ballistic missile (also known as the MAZ-543) (Soviet Union; Cold War)
- 9P157 self-propelled anti-tank vehicle with 9M123 Khrizantema missiles based on the BMP-3 (Soviet Union; modern)
- 9P162 self-propelled anti-tank vehicle with 9M133 Kornet missiles based on the BMP-3 (Soviet Union; modern)
- 9S482 designation for the PU-12M 8×8 air defence command vehicle (Soviet Union; Cold War/modern)
- 9TP light tank (Poland; World War II)
- 15cwt truck series (British; World War II)

== A ==
- A4 AVL 4×4 armoured utility vehicle (France; modern)
- A7SC 4×2 armoured car (United States; pre–World War II)
- A7V heavy tank (Sturmpanzerwagen) (Germany; World War I)
- A9 Cruiser Tank Mark I medium tank (United Kingdom; pre–World War II)
- A10 Cruiser Tank Mark II medium tank (United Kingdom; pre–World War II)
- A11 Infantry Tank Mark I light tank (United Kingdom; pre–World War II)
- A12 Infantry Tank Mark II light tank (United Kingdom; pre–World War II)
- A13 Cruiser Tank Mark III medium tank (United Kingdom; pre–World War II)
- A13 Cruiser Tank Mark IV medium tank (United Kingdom; pre–World War II)
- A13 Covenanter Cruiser Tank Mark V medium tank (United Kingdom; pre–World War II)
- A15 Crusader Cruiser Tank Mark VI medium tank (United Kingdom; World War II)
- A22 Churchill Infantry Tank Mark IV medium tank (United Kingdom; World War II)
- A24 Cavalier Cruiser Tank Mark VII medium tank (United Kingdom; World War II)
- A27 Cromwell Cruiser Tank Mark VIII medium tank (United Kingdom; World War II)
- A30 Challenger Cruiser Tank Mark VIII medium tank (United Kingdom; World War II)
- A34 Comet Cruiser Tank medium tank (United Kingdom; World War II)
- A39 Tortoise anti-tank vehicle (United Kingdom; World War II)
- A43 Black Prince Infantry Tank medium tank (United Kingdom;)
- A41 Centurion main battle tank (United Kingdom; Cold War)
- A45 Caernarvon heavy tank (also known as the FV201 and FV221) (United Kingdom; World War II)
- A-531 armoured personnel carrier (also known as the Type 63 or YW531) (China; Cold War)
- AAV-7 amphibious armoured vehicle series (United States; Cold War)
- AAVC-7 amphibious command vehicle (United States; Cold War)
- AAVP-7 amphibious armoured personnel carrier (United States; Cold War)
- AAVR-7 amphibious recovery vehicle (United States; Cold War)
- AB 40 4×4 armoured car (Italy; World War II)
- AB 41 4×4 armoured car (Italy; World War II)
- Abrams (popular name for the M1 Abrams)
- AC1 Sentinel medium tank (also known as the Cruiser Tank Mk I) (Australia; World War II)
- ACEC Cobra armoured personnel carrier (Belgium; Cold War/modern)
- ACG-1 light tank (also known as the AMC 35) (France; pre–World War II)
- ACG-2 self-propelled anti-tank 75 mm gun (also known as the AMC 35) (France; pre–World War II)
- Achzarit armoured personnel carrier based on the T-54/55 chassis (Israel; Cold War/modern)
- ACTL, Italian transport vehicle
- ACV 300 infantry fighting vehicle based on the AIFV (Turkey; modern)
- ACV-S armoured vehicle based on the AIFV (Turkey; modern)
- AHSVS 8×8 armoured truck series (Germany; modern)
- AIFV infantry fighting vehicle based on the M113 (Turkey and United States; Cold War/modern)
- Al-Fao self-propelled 210 mm howitzer (Iraq; Cold War/modern)
- Al-Khalid reporting name for the MBT 2000 main battle tank (China and Pakistan; modern)
- Al-Zarar MBT main battle tank based on the T-59 (Pakistan; modern)
- Alacran (popular name for the BMS-1 Alacran)
- Alvis-Straussler (Uk; World War II)
- Alvis Striker SP ATGW Vehicle (Uk; modern)
- AM-IV 4×4 armoured security vehicle (Brazil; modern)
- AMC 34 light tank (also known as the YR) (France; pre–World War II)
- AMC 35 light tank (also known as the ACG-1) (France; pre–World War II)
- AML 20 4×4 armoured car (France; Cold War)
- AML 60 4×4 armoured car (France and South Africa; Cold War)
- AML 90 4×4 armoured car (France and South Africa; Cold War)
- AML 245 4×4 armoured car (France; Cold War)
- AMR 33 light tank (France; pre–World War II)
- AMR 35 light tank (France; pre–World War II)
- Amtrac common name for the American LVT series of amphibious vehicles
- AMV 8×6 armoured vehicle (Finland; modern)
- AMX-10P armoured personnel carrier (France; Cold War)
- AMX-10RC 6×6 armoured fighting vehicle (France; Cold War)
- AMX-13 light tank (France; Cold War)
- AMX 30 main battle tank (France; Cold War)
- AMX 32 main battle tank (France; Cold War)
- AMX 40 main battle tank (France; Cold War/modern)
- AMX-56 main battle tank (designation sometimes used for the Leclerc) (France; modern)
- AMX-VCI infantry fighting vehicle (France; Cold War)
- APRA-21 4×4 self-propelled multiple rocket launcher based on a Bucegi SR-114 chassis (Romania; Cold War)
- APRA-40 6×6 self-propelled multiple rocket launcher based on a DAC-665T chassis (Romania)
- APS-3 armored personnel carrier (Indonesia; modern)
- Archer (tank destroyer) (United Kingdom; World War II)
- Ariete (popular name for the C1 Ariete)
- Arjun MBT main battle tank (India; modern)
- Arma Amphibious tactical wheeled armoured vehicle (Turkey; modern)
- Armadillo wood and gravel extemporised AFV (United Kingdom; World War II)
- Armored Combat Earthmover (project name for the M9 ACE)
- Armored Gun System (project name for the XM8 AGS)
- Armored Infantry Fighting Vehicle (project name for the AIFV)
- ATS 56 G, Soviet artillery tractor used in the Vietnam War
- Armoured Vehicle Launched Bridge (AVLB)
- ASCOD series of armoured vehicles (Austria and Spain; modern)
- ASLAV 8×8 infantry fighting vehicle based on the LAV 25 (Australia and Canada; modern)
- Asad Babil (Iraqi designation for license-built T-72)
- ASU-57 self-propelled 57 mm gun (Soviet Union; Cold War)
- ASU-85 self-propelled 85 mm gun (Soviet Union; Cold War)
- AT105 Saxon wheeled armoured personnel carrier (United Kingdom; Cold War)
- AT-P tracked prime mover and artillery crew transporter (Soviet Union; Cold War)
- Austin Armoured Car (United Kingdom; World War I)
- Avenger air defence vehicle based on the HMMWV (United States; modern)
- AVGP Cougar wheeled fire support vehicle (Canada; Cold War)
- AVGP Grizzly wheeled armoured personnel carrier (Canada; Cold War)
- AVGP Husky wheeled maintenance and recovery vehicle (Canada; Cold War)

== B ==
- B1 Centauro 8×8 tank destroyer (Italy; modern)
- B-531 armoured personnel carrier (also known as the Type 63 or YW531) (China; Cold War)
- BA-3 6×4 armoured car (Soviet Union; pre–World War II)
- BA-6 6×4 armoured car (Soviet Union; pre–World War II)
- BA-10 6×4 armoured car (Soviet Union; pre–World War II)
- BA-64 4×4 armoured car (Soviet Union; World War II)
- Bateleur 4×4 self-propelled multiple rocket launcher based on a SAMIL 20 truck (South Africa; modern)
- BCL-M5 4×4 armoured personnel carrier (Algeria; modern)
- BDX 4×4 armoured personnel carrier (Belgium; Cold War)
- Bison concrete armoured lorry (United Kingdom; World War II)
- Bison 8×8 armoured personnel carrier (Canada; modern)
- BJ2020 4×4 utility vehicle based on the Jeep Cherokee (XJ) (China; Cold War / modern)
- BJ2022 Brave Warrior 4×4 utility vehicle (China; modern)
- BJ212 Beijing Jeep 4×4 utility vehicle based on the UAZ-469 (China; Cold War / modern)
- Black Eagle Tank (Russian:Chorny Oriol) main battle tank (Russia; modern)
- Black Knight (unmanned combat vehicle)
- Black Panther (popular name for the K2 Black Panther)
- BLG-60 bridging vehicle (East Germany/Poland; Cold War)
- BLG-67 bridging vehicle (East Germany/Poland; Cold War)
- Blitz (popular name for the C15)
- BLR 4×4 armoured personnel carrier (Spain; Cold War)
- BM-11 6×6 self-propelled multiple rocket launcher based on a Ural-375D or Ural-4320 chassis (North Korea; Cold War)
- BM-21 Grad 4×4 and 6×6 self-propelled multiple rocket launcher based on a GAZ-66, Ural-375D, Ural-4320 or ZIL-131 chassis (also known as M1964) (Soviet Union; Cold War)
- BMD-1 infantry fighting vehicle (Soviet Union; Cold War)
- BMD-2 infantry fighting vehicle (Soviet Union; Cold War)
- BMD-3 infantry fighting vehicle (Russia; modern)
- BMM-2 8×8 ambulance based on the K1Sh1 (Russia; modern)
- BMM-3 8×8 ambulance based on the K1Sh1 (Russia; modern)
- BMM-80 8×8 ambulance based on the K1Sh1 (Russia; modern)
- BMP-1 infantry fighting vehicle (Soviet Union; Cold War)
- BMP-2 infantry fighting vehicle (Soviet Union; Cold War/modern)
- BMP-3 infantry fighting vehicle (Russia; modern)
- BMP-23 infantry fighting vehicle based on the MT-LB (Bulgaria; Cold War/modern)
- BMP-30 infantry fighting vehicle based on the BMP-23 (Bulgaria; modern)
- BMR mine clearing vehicle (Soviet Union; Cold War)
- BMR-600 6×6 armoured personnel carrier (also known as Pegaso 3560) (Spain; Cold War)
- BMS-1 Alacran halftrack armoured personnel carrier based on the M3 Halftrack (Chile; Cold War)
- Boragh armoured personnel carrier based on the Type 86 (Iran; modern)
- BOV 4×4 armoured vehicle (Yugoslavia; Cold War)
- Bradley (popular name for the M2 Bradley and M3 Bradley)
- BRAVIA Commando Mk III armoured car (Portugal; Cold War)
- BRDM-1 4×4 reconnaissance vehicle (also known as M1958, M1959 and M1960) (Soviet Union; Cold War)
- BRDM-2 4×4 reconnaissance vehicle (Soviet Union; Cold War)
- BRDM-3 wheeled anti-tank vehicle (Soviet Union; Cold War)
- BREM-2 armored recovery vehicle based on the BMP-1 (Soviet Union; Cold War)
- BREM-L armored recovery vehicle based on the BMP-3 (Russia; modern)
- BRM-23 reconnaissance vehicle (Bulgaria; Cold War/modern)
- BT-2 light tank (Soviet Union; World War II)
- BT-5 light tank (Soviet Union; World War II)
- BT-7 light tank (Soviet Union; World War II)
- BT-8 light tank (Soviet Union; World War II)
- BTR-3 8×8 armoured personnel carrier (Ukraine; modern)
- BTR-4 8×8 armoured personnel carrier (Ukraine; modern)
- BTR-40 4×4 armoured personnel carrier (also known as M1956, M1957 and M1974/4) (Soviet Union; Cold War)
- BTR-50 tracked armoured personnel carrier (Soviet Union; Cold War)
- BTR-60 8×8 armoured personnel carrier (Soviet Union; Cold War)
- BTR-70 8×8 armoured personnel carrier (Soviet Union; Cold War)
- BTR-80 8×8 armoured personnel carrier (Soviet Union; Cold War/modern)
- BTR-90 8×8 armoured personnel carrier (Russia; modern)
- BTR-94 8×8 armoured personnel carrier (Ukraine; modern)
- BTR-140 (more commonly known as the BTR-152 6×6 armoured personnel carrier) (Soviet Union; Cold War)
- BTR-152 6×6 armoured personnel carrier (Soviet Union; Cold War)
- BTR-T infantry fighting vehicle (Russia; modern)
- BTS-1 armoured recovery vehicle (Soviet Union; Cold War)
- BTS-2 armoured recovery vehicle (Soviet Union; Cold War)
- BTS-3 armoured recovery vehicle (Soviet Union; Cold War)
- BTS-4 armoured recovery vehicle (Soviet Union; Cold War)
- Buffalo wheeled armoured personnel carrier (France; Cold War)
- Buffalo 6×6 anti-mine vehicle based on the Casspir (United States; modern)
- Buffalo (British designation of some of the American LVT series of amphibious vehicles)
- Buffel 4×4 mine protected armoured personnel carrier (South Africa; Cold War)
- Bushmaster 4×4 mine protected infantry mobility vehicle (Australia; modern)
- Bushmaster (designation used for the LVT-3 variant of the American LVT series of amphibious vehicles)
- Bv 202 articulated tractor and trailer (also known as the FV11021) (Sweden; Cold War)
- Bv 206 articulated tractor and trailer (Sweden; Cold War/modern)
- BVP-1 infantry fighting vehicle based on the BMP-1 (Czechoslovakia; Cold War)
- BVP-2 infantry fighting vehicle based on the BMP-2 (Czechoslovakia; Cold War/modern)
- BVP M-80 infantry fighting vehicle based on the M-80 (Yugoslavia; Cold War)
- BVS10 Viking articulated tractor and trailer (Sweden; modern)
- BVPzV Svatava reconnaissance vehicle based on the BMP-1 (Czechoslovakia; Cold War)
- BWP-1 (Polish designation of the BMP-1 infantry fighting vehicle (Soviet Union; Cold War)
- BWP-40 infantry fighting vehicle based on the BMP-1/ CV 90 (Poland and Sweden; modern)
- BWP-2000 infantry fighting vehicle based on the BMP-1 (Poland; modern)

== C ==
- C1 Ariete main battle tank (Italy; modern)
- Celere Sahariano prototype medium tank (Italy; World war II)
- C8 Quad 4×4 tractor (United Kingdom; pre–World War II)
- C8 4×4 8-cwt truck series (Canada; World War II)
- C13 Dardo infantry fighting vehicle (also known as the VCC-80) (Italy; modern)
- C15 4×2 and 4×4 15-cwt truck series (also known as the Blitz and 15cwt) (Canada; World War II)
- C30 4×4 30-cwt truck series (Canada; World War II)
- C60 4×4 and 6×6 60-cwt truck series (Canada; World War II)
- CA1 light tank (French; World War I)
- CA10 wheeled truck (China; Cold War)
- CA30 wheeled truck (China; Cold War)
- CA1091 4×2 5 ton truck (China; Cold War / modern)
- Camillino (popular name for the VCC-2 Camillino)
- Capraia (popular name for the R3 Capraia)
- Carden Loyd tankette (United Kingdom; World War II)
- Carro Armato (tanks)
  - Carro Leggero (popular name for the L6/40)
  - Carro Pesante (popular name for the P40 and P26/40)
  - Carro Veloce or ‘’fast tank’’ (popular name for the CV-29, CV-33 and CV-35)
- Cascavel (popular name for the EE-9 Cascavel)
- Casspir mine proof wheeled APC (South Africa; Cold War)
- Catapult self-propelled 130 mm gun (India; modern)
- Cavalier (popular name for the A24 Cavalier also known as Cruiser Tank Mark VII)
- Cazador tracked TOW missile carrier (Spain; Cold War)
- CCKW, or GMC CCKW 6×6 2.5 ton truck (also known as G-508) (United States; World War II)
- Centauro (popular name for the B1 Centauro 8×8 tank destroyer) (Italy; modern)
- Centurion (popular name for the A41 and FV4001 Centurion series)
- Chaffee (popular name for the M24 Chaffee)
- Chaimite wheeled armoured personnel carrier (Portugal; Cold War)
- Challenger (popular name for the A30 Cruiser Tank Mark VIII)
- Challenger 1 (popular name for the FV4030 Challenger)
- Challenger 2 (popular name for the FV4034 Challenger)
- Chaparral (popular name for the M48 Chaparral)
- Char 2C Alsace super-heavy tank (also known as FCM 2C) (France; pre–World War II)
- Char B1 medium tank (France; pre–World War II)
- Char D1 medium tank (France; pre–World War II)
- Char Léger Hotchkiss H-35 (official designation for the Hotchkiss H35)
- Char Mitrailleuse Renault FT-31 (official designation for the Renault FT-31)
- Charger (popular name for the RG-31)
- Chi-Ha (name for the Type 97 Chi-Ha)
- Chi-He (name for the Type 1 Chi-He)
- Chi-Nu (name for the Type 3 Chi-Nu)
- Chieftain (popular name for the FV4201 Chieftain)
- Chiyoda armored car first domestic armored car (Japan; pre–World War II)
- Ch'onma-ho main battle tank (North Korea;modern)
- CM-21 armoured personnel carrier based on the M113 (Taiwan; Cold War)
- Cobra (popular name for the ACEC Cobra)
- Combat Engineer Vehicle (program name for the M728 CEV)
- Comet (popular name for the A34 Comet I)
- Commando (popular name for the BRAVIA Commando Mk III)
- Commando (popular name for the Cadillac Gage V-100 Commando series)
- Commando Scout (popular name for the Cadillac Gage Commando Scout)
- Condor 4×4 armoured personnel carrier (Germany; Cold War)
- Conqueror (popular name for the FV214 Conqueror)
- Cougar (popular name for the AVGP Cougar)
- Covenanter (popular name for the A13 Cruiser Tank Mark V)
- Coyote Reconnaissance Vehicle (Canada; modern)
- CQ261 wheeled truck (China; Cold War)
- Cromwell (popular name for the A27 Cruiser Tank Mark VIII)
- Cruiser Tank Mk I medium tank (also known as the A9) (United Kingdom; pre–World War II (1938))
- Cruiser Tank Mk I medium tank (also known as the AC1) (Australia; World War II)
- Cruiser Tank Mk II medium tank (also known as the A10) (United Kingdom; World War II)
- Cruiser Tank Mk III medium tank (also known as the A13) (United Kingdom; World War II)
- Cruiser Tank Mk IV medium tank (also known as the A13) (United Kingdom; World War II)
- Cruiser Tank Mark V medium tank (also known as the A13 Covenanter) (United Kingdom; World War II)
- Cruiser Tank Mark VI medium tank (also known as the A15 Crusader) (United Kingdom; World War II)
- Cruiser Tank Mark VII medium tank (also known as the A24 Cavalier) (United Kingdom; World War II)
- Cruiser Tank Mark VIII medium tank (also known as the A27 Cromwell) (United Kingdom; World War II)
- Cruiser Tank Mark VIII medium tank (also known as the A30 Challenger) (United Kingdom; World War II)
- Crusader (popular name for the A15 Cruiser Tank Mark VI)
- CTLS light tank (also known as T14 and T15) (United States; (World War II)
- CV-29 (also known as the Carro Veloce) (designation for the Carden Loyd tankette)
- CV-33 light tank based on the CV-29 (also known as the Carro Veloce) (Italy; pre–World War II)
- CV-35 light tank based on the CV-33 (also known as the Carro Veloce and L3/35) (Italy; pre–World War II)
- CV 90 family of infantry fighting vehicles (Sweden; modern)
- CV 9025 infantry fighting vehicle version of the CV 90 (Sweden; modern)
- CV 9030 infantry fighting vehicle version of the CV 90 (Sweden; modern)
- CV 9035 infantry fighting vehicle version of the CV 90 (Sweden; modern)
- CV 9040 infantry fighting vehicle version of the CV 90 (Sweden; modern)
- CV 9056 anti-tank vehicle version of the CV 90 (Sweden; modern)
- CV 90105 light tank version of the CV 90 (Sweden; modern)
- CV 90120 light tank version of the CV 90 (Sweden; modern)
- Cultivator No. 6 trench forming machine (United Kingdom; World War II)

== D ==
- D421 cable carrier based on the Type 60 (China; Cold War)
- Dardo popular name for the C13 infantry fighting vehicle (also known as the VCC-80) (Italy; modern)
- DAF ya4440/ya4442 Dutch transport truck
- DAF ya328 Dutch transport truck (1950–1980)
- DAF ya126 Dutch transport truck (1947–1960)
- DANA self-propelled 152 mm howitzer (Czechoslovakia; Cold War)
- Dingo 4×4 armoured car (Australia; World War II)
- Dingo 4×4 armoured car (United Kingdom; World War II)
- Dozor-B 4×4 armoured car (Ukraine; modern)
- DP-90 artillery reconnaissance vehicle based on the OT-90 (Czechoslovakia; Cold War)
- DPM convoy escort vehicle based on the T-55 (Soviet Union; Cold War)
- Dragoon 300 wheeled armoured fighting vehicle (United States; modern)
- DTP-90 maintenance vehicle based on the OT-90 (Czechoslovakia; Cold War)
- DUKW 6×6 amphibious utility vehicle (United States; World War II)
- Duster (unofficial name for the M42 Skysweeper)
- Dzik Armored Car (Poland; modern)

== E ==
- EJDER 6×6 Armoured Wheeled Vehicle(Turkey)
- Eagle (Nigerian name for the Main Battle Tank Mk 3)
- EBR 8×8 reconnaissance vehicle (France; Cold War/modern)
- EE-3 Jararaca 4×4 light reconnaissance vehicle (Brazil; Cold War)
- EE-9 Cascavel 6×6 armoured car (Brazil; Cold War)
- EE-11 Urutu 6×6 armoured personnel carrier (Brazil; Cold War)
- EE-17 Sucuri 6×6 armoured car (Brazil; modern)
- EE-18 Sucuri II 6×6 armoured car (Brazil; modern)
- EE-T1 Osório main battle tank (Brazil; Cold War/modern)
- EE-T2 Osório main battle tank (Brazil; Cold War/modern)
- EE-T4 Ogum armoured fighting vehicle (Brazil; Cold War/modern)
- EIFV infantry fighting vehicle based on the MTVL (United States; modern)
- Eland 4×4 armoured cars based on the AML (South Africa; Cold War)
- EQ1093 4×2 5 ton truck (China; Cold War)
- EQ1108 4×2 5 ton truck (China; Cold War)
- EQ1141 4×2 8 ton truck (China; Cold War)
- EQ2050 Mengshi 4×4 utility vehicle based on the HMMWV (also known as the Hanma) (China; modern)
- EQ2058 up-armoured EQ2050 4×4 utility vehicle (China; modern)
- EQ2061 4×4 1.5 ton truck (China; Cold War)
- EQ2081 6×6 2.5 ton truck (China; Cold War)
- EQ2082 6×6 2.5 ton truck (China; Cold War)
- EQ2100 6×6 3.5 ton truck (China; Cold War)
- EQ2102 6×6 3.5 ton truck (China; modern)
- ERC-1 (designation for the ERC-90 F4 Sagaie)
- ERC-2 (designation for the ERC-90 F4 Sagaie 2)
- ERC-20 Kriss 6×6 armoured car (France; Cold War)
- ERC-60 Sagaie 6×6 armoured car (France; Cold War)
- ERC-90 F1 Lynx 6×6 armoured car (France; Cold War)
- ERC-90 F4 Sagaie 6×6 armoured car (France; Cold War)
- ERC-90 F4 Sagaie 2 6×6 armoured car (France; Cold War / modern)

== F ==
- F8 4×2 8-cwt truck series (Canada; World War II)
- F15 4×2 and 4×4 15-cwt truck series (also known as the Blitz and 15cwt) (Canada; World War II)
- F30 4×4 30-cwt truck series (Canada; World War II)
- F60 4×4 and 6×4 60-cwt truck series (Canada; World War II)
- Family of Medium Tactical Vehicles (project name for the M1078 FMTV series)
- FCM 36 light tank (French; pre–World War II)
- Ferret FV711 armoured car (UK, modern)
- Fiat 2000 light tank (Italy; World War I)
- Fiat 3000 light tank (Italy; pre–World War II)
- Fiat 6614 wheeled armoured personnel carrier (Italy; Cold War)
- Fiat 6616 heavy armoured car (Italy; Cold War/modern)
- Field Artillery Ammunition Support Vehicle (project name for the M992 FAASV)
- Fire Support Vehicle (project name for the M981 FSV)
- Fabrique Nationale AS 24 (Belgium; Cold War)
- FN Tricar (Belgium; World War II)
- Ford FT-B Armored car (Poland; Polish-Soviet war)
- Fox armoured car (CVR (W) UK, modern
- Freccia
- FT-31 light tank (France; World War II)
- FCM 2C Alsace heavy tank (also known as Char 2C) (France; pre–World War II)
- Fuchs (popular name for the Transportpanzer 1)
- FUG 4×4 reconnaissance vehicle (Hungary; Cold War)
- FV101 Scorpion light tank (United Kingdom; Cold War)
- FV102 Striker self-propelled ATGM carrier (United Kingdom; Cold War)
- FV103 Spartan armoured specialist personnel carrier (United Kingdom; Cold War)
- FV104 Samaritan armoured ambulance (United Kingdom; Cold War)
- FV105 Sultan command vehicle (United Kingdom; Cold War)
- FV106 Samson armoured recovery vehicle (United Kingdom; Cold War)
- FV107 Scimitar light tank (United Kingdom; Cold War)
- FV120 Spartan self-propelled anti-tank vehicle with MILAN anti-tank launcher (United Kingdom; Cold War)
- FV180 tractor (United Kingdom; Cold War)
- FV201 main battle tank (also known as the A45 Caernarvon) (United Kingdom; World War II)
- FV214 Conqueror main battle tank (United Kingdom; Cold War)
- FV219 armoured recovery vehicle based on the FV201 (United Kingdom; Cold War)
- FV221 medium tank based on the FV201 (United Kingdom; Cold War)
- FV222 Conqueror armoured recovery vehicle based on the FV214 Conqueror (United Kingdom; Cold War)
- FV400 tank
- FV401 Cambridge armoured personnel carrier
- FV402 tank
- FV420 armoured personnel carrier
- FV421 armoured cargo carrier
- FV422 armoured personnel carrier
- FV423 command vehicle
- FV424 armoured engineering vehicle
- FV425 armoured carrier
- FV426 anti-tank vehicle with Orange William HESH anti-tank missiles (United Kingdom; Cold War)
- FV431 armoured truck (United Kingdom; Cold War)
- FV432 armoured personnel carrier (United Kingdom; Cold War)
- FV433 Abbot self-propelled 105 mm gun based on the FV432 chassis (United Kingdom; Cold War)
- FV434 armoured engineering vehicle based on the FV432 (United Kingdom; Cold War)
- FV435 Wavell communications vehicle
- FV436 {variant fitted with Green Archer radar} based on the FV432 (United Kingdom; Cold War)
- FV437{Pathfinder vehicle with snorkel gear} based on FV432
- FV438 Wavell self-propelled anti-tank vehicle based on the FV432 with a Swingfire anti-tank missile launcher (United Kingdom; Cold War)
- FV439 signals vehicle based on the FV432 (United Kingdom; Cold War)
- FV510 Warrior infantry fighting vehicle (United Kingdom; Cold War/modern)
- FV511 Warrior command vehicle (United Kingdom; Cold War/modern)
- FV512 Warrior armoured repair vehicle (United Kingdom; Cold War/modern)
- FV513 Warrior armoured recovery vehicle (United Kingdom; Cold War/modern)
- FV514 Warrior reconnaissance vehicle (United Kingdom; Cold War/modern)
- FV515 Warrior artillery command vehicle (United Kingdom; Cold War/modern)
- FV601 Saladin armoured car (United Kingdom; Cold War)
- FV603 Saracen 6×6 armoured personnel carrier (United Kingdom; Cold War)
- FV604 Saracen 6×6 armoured personnel carrier (United Kingdom; Cold War)
- FV610 6×6 command vehicle based on the FV604 Saracen (United Kingdom; Cold War)
- FV611 6×6 ambulance based on the FV604 Saracen (United Kingdom; Cold War)
- FV621 Stalwart amphibious 6×6 5 ton truck (also known as the Stolly) (United Kingdom; Cold War)
- FV622 Stalwart amphibious 6×6 5 ton truck (also known as the Stolly) (United Kingdom; Cold War)
- FV623 Stalwart amphibious 6×6 5 ton artillery supply vehicle (also known as the Stolly) (United Kingdom; Cold War)
- FV624 Stalwart amphibious 6×6 5 ton recovery vehicle (also known as the Stolly) (United Kingdom; Cold War)
- FV711 Ferret 4×4 armoured car (United Kingdom; Cold War)
- FV721 Fox 4×4 armoured car (United Kingdom; Cold War)
- FV1600 Humber 1 ton 4×4 truck (United Kingdom; Cold War)
- FV1601 Humber 1 ton 4×4 truck (United Kingdom; Cold War)
- FV1604 Humber 1 ton 4×4 truck (United Kingdom; Cold War)
- FV1606 Humber 1 ton 4×4 wrecker/tow truck (United Kingdom; Cold War)
- FV1609 Humber 1 ton 4×4 armoured vehicle based on the Humber 1 ton truck (also known as the Pig) (United Kingdom; Cold War)
- FV1611 Humber 1 ton 4×4 armoured vehicle based on the Humber 1 ton truck (also known as the Pig) (United Kingdom; Cold War)
- FV1612 Humber 1 ton 4×4 armoured vehicle (United Kingdom; Cold War)
- FV1801A The Austin Champ 4x4 1/4ton CT/GS cargo (United Kingdom; Cold War)
- FV1620 Humber 1 ton 4×4 anti-tank vehicle with Malkara missiles based on the FV1611 (Australia and United Kingdom; Cold War)
- FV3801 tractor based on the Centurion (United Kingdom; Cold War)
- FV3802 self-propelled 25pdr gun based on the Centurion chassis (United Kingdom; Cold War)
- FV3803 command vehicle based on the Centurion (United Kingdom; Cold War)
- FV3804 ammunition supply vehicle based on the Centurion chassis (United Kingdom; Cold War)
- FV3805 self-propelled 140 mm gun based on the Centurion chassis (United Kingdom; Cold War)
- FV3806 self-propelled 183 mm gun based on the Centurion chassis (United Kingdom; Cold War)
- FV3901 bridge layer based on the Churchill chassis (United Kingdom; World War II/Cold War)
- FV3902 based on the Churchill (United Kingdom; World War II/Cold War)
- FV3903 armoured engineering vehicle based on the Churchill (United Kingdom; World War II/Cold War)
- FV3904 armoured personnel carrier based on the Churchill (United Kingdom; World War II/Cold War)
- FV4001 Centurion main battle tank (United Kingdom; Cold War)
- FV4002 Centurion AVLB bridging vehicle (United Kingdom; Cold War)
- FV4003 Centurion AVRE combat engineer vehicle (United Kingdom; Cold War)
- FV4004 Conway main battle tank based on the Centurion (United Kingdom; Cold War)
- FV4005 self-propelled anti-tank gun based on the Centurion chassis (United Kingdom; Cold War)
- FV4006 Centurion ARV armoured recovery vehicle (United Kingdom; Cold War)
- FV4007 Centurion Mk 1, 2, 3, 4, 7 and 8 main battle tank (United Kingdom; Cold War)
- FV4008 Centurion (United Kingdom; Cold War)
- FV4009 medium tank (United Kingdom; Cold War)
- FV4010 anti-tank vehicle with Malkara missiles based on the Centurion chassis (United Kingdom; Cold War)
- FV4011 Centurion Mk 5 main battle tank (United Kingdom; Cold War)
- FV4012 Centurion Mk 7 main battle tank (United Kingdom; Cold War)
- FV4013 armoured recovery vehicle based on the Centurion (United Kingdom; Cold War)
- FV4014 medium tank (United Kingdom; Cold War)
- FV4015 Centurion Mk 9 main battle tank (United Kingdom; Cold War)
- FV4016 bridge layer based on the Centurion chassis (United Kingdom; Cold War)
- FV4017 Centurion Mk 10 main battle tank (United Kingdom; Cold War)
- FV4018 amphibious armoured recovery based on the Centurion (United Kingdom; Cold War)
- FV4019 bulldozer based on the Centurion chassis (United Kingdom; Cold War)
- FV4030 Challenger main battle tank (United Kingdom; Cold War/modern)
- FV4034 Challenger 2 main battle tank (United Kingdom; modern)
- FV4101 Charioteer medium tank, based on the Cromwell (United Kingdom; World War II/Cold War)
- FV4201 Chieftain main battle tank (United Kingdom; Cold War)
- FV4202 Centurion main battle tank (United Kingdom; Cold War)
- FV4203 armoured engineering vehicle based on the Centurion (United Kingdom; Cold War)
- FV4204 Chieftain ARV armoured recovery vehicle (United Kingdom; Cold War)
- FV4205 Chieftain AVLB bridging vehicle (United Kingdom; Cold War)
- FV4207 VHF based on the Centurion tank (United Kingdom; Cold War)
- FV4211 prototype tank (United Kingdom; Cold War)
- FV4333 Stormer armoured personnel carrier (United Kingdom; Cold War)
- FV4401 prototype main battle tank similar to the Stridsvagn 103 (United Kingdom; Cold War)
- FV4501 armoured mine clearer (United Kingdom; Cold War)
- FV4601 prototype main battle tank (also known as the MBT-80) (United Kingdom; Cold War)
- FV11021 articulated tractor and trailer (also known as the Bv 202) (Sweden; Cold War)
- FV18001 4x4 1/4ton Cargo based on the Land Rover Series I including 80", 86" and 107" wheelbase (United Kingdom; Cold War)
- FV18003 4x4 1/4 ton Airfield Lighting Maintenance, based on the Land Rover Series I 86" wheelbase (United Kingdom; Cold War)
- FV18004 4x4 Command Car, based on the Land Rover Series I 107" station wagon (United Kingdom; Cold War)
- FV18005 4×4 2-stretcher Ambulance based on the Land Rover Series I 107" station wagon chassis (United Kingdom; Cold War)
- FV18006 4x4 SAS Reconnaissance Vehicle based on the Land Rover Series I 86" wheelbase (United Kingdom; Cold War)
- FV18007 4x4 and 4x2 1/4ton Cargo and Utility based on the Land Rover Series I 88"/109" plus a special 2WD version of the 88" (United Kingdom; Cold War)
- FV18008 4×4 4-stretcher ambulance based on the Land Rover Series I 107" station wagon chassis (United Kingdom; Cold War)
- FV18009 4x4 Vehicle to tow and support the MOBAT 120 mm based on the FV18007 88" wheelbase GS
- FV18044 4×4 ambulance based on the Land Rover Series II (United Kingdom; Cold War)
- FV18067 4×4 ambulance based on the Land Rover Series IIA and III (United Kingdom; Cold War)

== G ==
- G-507 6x6 1.5 ton truck (also known as the WC-62 and the WC-63 when equipped with a winch)(United States; World War II)
- G-508 6×6 2.5 ton truck (also known as the CCKW) (United States; World War II)
- G-630 6×6 2.5 ton truck (also known as the US-6) (United States; World War II)
- G-651 6×6 2.5 ton truck (also known as the M-5H-6) (United States; World War II)
- G-1400 4×4 1.5 ton truck series (United States; pre–World War II)
- G-7100 4×4 1.5 ton truck series (United States; pre–World War II)
- G-7117 4×4 1.5 ton truck series (United States; World War II)
- Gadfly (popular name for the SA-11)
- Gainful (popular name for the SA-6)
- Gauntlet (popular name for the SA-15)
- Gecko (popular name for the SA-8)
- Ganef (popular name for the SA-4)
- Gaskin (popular name for the SA-9)
- GAZ-46 4×4 amphibious

utility vehicle (Soviet Union; World War II)

- GAZ-61 4×4 utility vehicle (Soviet Union; Cold War)
- GAZ-63 wheeled truck (Soviet Union; Cold War)
- GAZ-64 4×4 utility vehicle (Soviet Union; World War II)
- GAZ-66 4×4 utility vehicle (Soviet Union; Cold War)
- GAZ-69 4×4 utility vehicle (also known as UAZ-69) (Soviet Union; Cold War)
- GAZ-5903 designation for the BTR-80 8×8 armoured personnel carrier (Soviet Union; Cold War)
- GAZ-59031 designation for the GAZ-5903 8×8 command vehicle (Soviet Union; Cold War)
- GAZ-59032 designation for the GAZ-5903 8×8 command vehicle (Soviet Union; Cold War)
- GAZ-59033 designation for the BREM-K 8×8 armoured recovery vehicle (Soviet Union; Cold War)
- GAZ-59034 designation for the GAZ-5903 8×8 infantry fighting vehicle (Soviet Union; Cold War)
- GAZ-59039 designation for the GAZ-5903 8×8 ambulance (Russia; modern)
- GAZ-3937 Vodnik 4×4 armoured vehicle (Russia; modern)
- GAZ-39344 SIAM 4×4 reconnaissance vehicle (Russia; modern)
- GCT self-propelled 155 mm artillery (France; Cold War/modern)
- Golan Armored Vehicle IFV/MRAP (United States/Israel; modern)
- Gopher (popular name for the SA-13)
- GPA 4×4 amphibious utility vehicle (United States; World War II)
- GPW 4×4 Utility Vehicle (United States; World War II)
- Grad (popular name for the BM-21)
- Grenadier (popular name for the MOWAG Grenadier)
- Grizzly (popular name for the AVGP Grizzly)
- Grizzly (tank) Medium tank. Based on the M4 Sherman tank. (Canada; World War II)
- Grizzly APC by Xe
- GT-M tracked armoured personnel carrier (Soviet Union; Cold War)
- GT-MU tracked command and control vehicle (Soviet Union; Cold War)
- Guardian (popular name for the M117 Guardian)
- Gun Carrier Mark I self-propelled artillery (United Kingdom; World War I)
- G-Wagen 4×4 utility vehicle (West Germany; Cold War)

== H ==
- HS.30 armoured personnel carrier (West Germany; Cold War)
- Ha-Go (company name for the Type 95 Ha-Go)
- Heavy Expanded Mobility Ammunition Trailer (project name for the M983 HEMAT)
- Heavy Expanded Mobility Tactical Truck (project name for the M977 HEMTT series)
- Hellcat (popular name for the M18 Hellcat)
- Humvee (project name for the M998 HMMWV series)
- High Mobility Artillery Rocket System (HIMARS)
- HLVW 6×6 truck series based on the Steyr Percheron truck chassis (Canada; Cold War/modern)
- Ho-Ro (name for the Type 38 Ho-Ro)
- H35 light tank (France; pre–World War II)
- H39 light tank (France; pre–World War II)
- Hotchkiss M201 light utility truck, (France; post World War II)
- Hotspur armoured car and internal security vehicle
- Hotspur Hussar lengthened armoured personnel carrier version of the Hotspur for military use.
- Humber Armoured Car
- Humber Light Reconnaissance Car
- Humber scout car (United Kingdom; World War II)
- Humber one-ton APC
- Husky (popular name for the AVGP Husky)
- HWK 11 armoured personnel carrier (Germany; Cold War)
- HY472 6×6 truck tractor and trailer with a DF-21 medium range ballistic missile (also known HY4260 or Type 82) (China; Cold War)
- HY473 6×6 truck tractor (also known as the Type 82) (China; Cold War)
- HY2150 4×4 truck (also known as the HY473 or Type 82) (China; Cold War)
- HY4160 4×4 truck tractor (also known as the HY473 or Type 82) (China; Cold War)
- HY4191 4×4 truck tractor (also known as the HY473 or Type 82) (China; Cold War)
- HY4260 6×6 truck tractor and trailer with a DF-21 medium range ballistic missile (also known as the HY472 or Type 82) (China; Cold War)
- HY4310 8×8 truck tractor and trailer with a DF-31 intercontinental ballistic missile (also known as the HY472 or Type 82) (China; Cold War)
- HY4330 8×8 truck tractor and trailer with a DF-31 intercontinental ballistic missile (also known as the HY472 or Type 82) (China; Cold War)
- HY4390 8×8 truck tractor (also known as the HY473 or Type 82) (China; Cold War)
- HY4320 6×6 truck tractor (also known as the HY473 or Type 82) (China; Cold War)
- HY5270 6×6 truck tractor (also known as the HY473 or Type 82) (China; Cold War)
- HY5300 6×6 truck tractor (also known as the HY473 or Type 82) (China; Cold War)

== I ==
- IFVL infantry fighting vehicle based on the MTVL (United States; modern)
- Ikv 91 tracked tank destroyer (Sweden; Cold War)
- Iltis (popular name for the Type 183)
- International MXT-MV Possible HMMWV replacement armoured.
- Improved TOW Vehicle (project name for the M901 ITV)
- IMR combat engineer vehicle based on the T-55 chassis (Soviet Union; Cold War)
- IMR-2 combat engineer vehicle based on the T-72 chassis (Soviet Union; Cold War)
- Iosef Stalin series of heavy tanks (Soviet Union; World War II)
- IS-2 (designation for the Iosef Stalin)
- IS-3 (designation for the Iosef Stalin)
- IT-122 self-propelled 122 mm gun based on the T-55 (Soviet Union; Cold War)
- IWT combat engineering vehicle based on the T-55 (Poland; Cold War)

== J ==
- Jackson (popular name for the M36 Jackson)
- Jagdpanzer Jaguar 1 self-propelled HOT missile vehicle (Germany; Cold War)
- Jagdpanzer Jaguar 2 self-propelled TOW missile vehicle (Germany; Cold War)
- Jagdpanzer Kanone tank destroyer (Germany; Cold War)
- Jagdpanzer Rakete self-propelled SS.11 missile vehicle (Germany; Cold War)
- Jaguar tank (main battle tank (International; modern))
- Jankel Fox based on Toyota Landcruiser
- Jankel LTTV,Unimog U5000 based on Light Transport Tactical Vehicle used by Belgium Special Forces
- Jararaca (popular name for the EE-3 Jararaca)
- JN252 wheeled truck (China; Cold War)
- JS (alternate spelling for the Iosef Stalin series of tanks)
- JVTB-55A crane tank based on the T-55 chassis (Czechoslovakia; Cold War)
- Jakkals Jakkals Light Utility Vehicle (South Africa)

== K ==
- K1 main battle tank (also known as Type 88) (Korea; modern)
- K1Sh1 8×8 command post based on the BTR-80 (Soviet Union; Cold War)
- K2 Black Panther main battle tank (Korea; modern)
- K200 infantry fighting vehicle (also known as the KIFV) (South Korea; Cold War/modern)
- K216 NBC reconnaissance vehicle based on the K200 (South Korea; modern)
- K242 self-propelled 107 mm mortar based on the K200 (South Korea; modern)
- K263 self-propelled anti-aircraft vehicle with 20 mm Vulcan air defence system based on the K200 (South Korea; modern)
- K277 command vehicle based on the K200 (South Korea; modern)
- K281 self-propelled 81 mm mortar based on the K200 (South Korea; modern)
- K288 armoured recovery vehicle based on the K200 (South Korea; modern)
- Fahd wheeled armoured personnel carrier (Egypt; Cold War)
- KAFIV 30 infantry fighting vehicle based on the K200 (South Korea; modern)
- KAFIV 90 infantry fighting vehicle based on the K200 (South Korea; modern)
- KAM-1 armoured recovery vehicle based on the T-54 chassis (Finland; Cold War)
- KAM-2 armoured recovery vehicle based on the T-55 chassis (Finland; Cold War)
- Kangaroo armoured personnel carrier (Canada; World War II)
- Ke-Go (army name for the Type 95 Ha-Go)
- Kentauras infantry fighting vehicle (Greece; modern)
- KIFV infantry fighting vehicle
- kleiner Panzerbefehlwagen I (designation for command variant of the Panzer I)
- Kliment Voroshilov series of heavy tanks (Soviet Union; World War II)
- Korean Infantry Fighting Vehicle (South Korea; Cold War)
- KrAZ series of cargo, special purpose and armoured personnel vehicles (Ukraine; modern)
- Kubuś Armored Car (Poland; World War II)
- Kübelwagen (popular name for the Type 82, 86, 87, 92, 820, 821, 822, 823, 825, 826 and 827
- Kurierwagen (popular name for the Type 181, also known as the Type 182, Thing, Safari and Trekker)
- Kürassier (popular name for the SK-105 Kürassier, an Austrian light tank)

== L ==
- L3/35 light tank based on the CV-33 (also known as the Carro Veloce CV-35) (Italy; pre–World War II)
- L6/40 light tank (also known as the Carro Armato) (Italy; World War II)
- L-33 self-propelled 155 mm gun based on a M4 Sherman chassis (Israel; Cold War)
- Land Rover Wolf (Main utility vehicle of the British Army)
- Landwirtschäftlicher Schlepper (cover name for the Panzer I)
- LAV-25 8×8 armoured personnel carrier based on the Mowag Piranha (Canada; Cold War / modern)
- LAV III 8×8 armoured personnel carrier (Canada; Cold War / modern)
- LAV-300 6×6 armoured vehicle (also known as the V-300 Commando (United States; Cold War)
- LAV-600 6×6 fire support vehicle (also known as the V-600 Commando (United States; Cold War)
- Lazar BVT-SR-8808-MRAP 8×8 armoured personnel carrier (Serbia; modern)
- Leclerc main battle tank (France; modern)
- Leonidas-2 armoured personnel carrier based on the 4K 7FA (Greece; modern)
- Leopard 1 main battle tank (Germany; Cold War)
- Leopard 2 main battle tank (Germany; Cold War/modern)
- Leopard security vehicle - improvised protected personnel carrier; Rhodesian Bush War
- Liberty – popular name for US version of the Mark VIII
- Light Tank Mark VI (United Kingdom; World War II)
- Lince 4×4 armoured car based on the Daimler Dingo (Italy; World War II)
- Lion of Babylon tank (Iraq; modern)
- LMV Lince 4×4 utility vehicle (also known as the Panther CLV) (Italy; modern)
- Locust (popular name for the M22)
- Logistic Vehicle System (project name for the Mk 48 LVS family)
- LOV-ABK 4×4 NBC reconnaissance vehicle (Croatia; modern)
- LOV-ED 4×4 electronic warfare vehicle (Croatia; modern)
- LOV-IZV 4×4 reconnaissance vehicle (Croatia; modern)
- LOV-OP 4×4 armoured personnel carrier (Croatia; modern)
- LOV-RAK 4×4 self-propelled multiple rocket launcher (Croatia; modern)
- LOV-UP 4×4 artillery fire control vehicle (Croatia; modern)
- LOV-Z 4×4 command vehicle (Croatia; modern)
- LSVW 4×4 utility vehicle based on the 40.10WM (Italy and United States; modern)
- LT-105 light tank based on the ASCOD (Austria and Spain; modern)
- LT vz. 35 (Original Czechoslovak designation for the Panzer 35(t))
- LT vz. 38 (Original Czechoslovak designation for the Panzer 38(t))
- Luchs (popular name for the Spahpanzer Luchs)
- LVT-1 amphibious vehicle (United States; World War II)
- LVT-2 Water Buffalo amphibious vehicle (also known as Buffalo II) (United States; World War II)
- LVT-3 Bushmaster amphibious vehicle (United States; World War II)
- LVT-4 Water Buffalo amphibious vehicle (also known as Buffalo IV or Sea Serpent) (United States; World War II)
- LVT-5 amphibious vehicle series (United States; Cold War)
- LVTAA-1 amphibious vehicle with a M42 Duster turret (twin 40 mm anti-aircraft guns) (United States; Cold War)
- LVTC-5 amphibious command vehicle (United States; Cold War)
- LVTE-5 amphibious mine-clearing vehicle (United States; Cold War)
- LVTH-5 amphibious self-propelled 105 mm howitzer (United States; Cold War)
- LVTP-5 amphibious armoured personnel carrier (United States; Cold War)
- LVTR-5 amphibious recovery vehicle (United States; Cold War)
- LVT-7 (former designation for the AAV-7)
- LVTC-7 (former designation for the AAVC-7)
- LVTP-7 (former designation for the AAVP-7)
- LVTR-7 (former designation for the AAVR-7)
- Lynx 4×4 armoured car based on the Daimler Dingo (Canada; World War II)
- Lynx (popular name for the M113 Command and Reconnaissance vehicle (United States; Cold War)

== M ==
- M1 Abrams main battle tank (United States; Cold War/modern)
- M1 Isherman medium tank based on the M4 Sherman (Israel; Cold War)
- M1 light tank (United States; pre–World War II)
- M1 6×4 ar; pre–World War II)
- M1 4×2 armoured vehicle (United States; pre–World War II)
- M1 4×4 1.5 ton truck with earth auger based on the Chevrolet G-7100 (United States; pre–World War II)
- M2 light tank (United States; pre–World War II)
- M2 Bradley infantry fighting vehicle (United States; Cold War/modern)
- M2 4×4 armoured car (United States; pre–World War II)
- M2 half-track armoured personnel carrier (United States; World War II)
- M3 Lee medium tank (United States; World War II)
- M3 Isherman medium tank based on the M4 Sherman (Israel; Cold War)
- M3 Stuart light tank (United States; World War II)
- M3 Bradley armoured reconnaissance vehicle (United States; Cold War/modern)
- M3 4×4 armoured car (United States; pre–World War II)
- M3 half-track armoured personnel carrier (United States; World War II)
- M3 4×4 armoured personnel carrier based on the Panhard AML (France; Cold War)
- M4 Sherman medium tank (United States; World War II)
- M4 4×4 armoured car (United States; pre–World War II)
- M4 mortar halftrack carrier (United States; World War II)
- M4 armoured command and control vehicle based on the MLRS chassis (United States; modern)
- M4 tractor (United States; World War II)
- M5 Stuart light tank (United States; World War II)
- M5 half-track armoured personnel carrier (United States; World War II)
- M5 tractor (United States; World War II)
- M6 Linebacker self-propelled anti-aircraft vehicle with FIM-92 Stinger missiles based on the M2 Bradley (United States; modern)
- M-5H-6 6×6 2.5 ton truck (also known as the G-651) (United States; World War II)
- M5 bulldozer mounted on M8 chassis (United States; Cold War)
- M6 bomb service truck 4×4 1.5-ton bomb service truck based on the Chevrolet G-7100 (United States; pre–World War II)
- M6 tractor (United States)
- M6 bulldozer mounted on the M47 Patton chassis (United States; Cold War)
- M7 Bradley fire support vehicle (United States; modern)
- M7 Priest self-propelled 105 mm howitzer (United States; World War II)
- M7 snow tractor (United States; World War II)
- M8 Greyhound 6×6 armoured car (United States; World War II)
- M8 armored gun system 105 mm armoured gun system (United States; modern)
- M8 Scott self-propelled 75 mm howitzer (United States; World War II)
- M8 tractor based on the M48 (United States; Cold War)
- M8 bulldozer based on the M8 tractor (United States; Cold War)
- M9 ACE combat engineer vehicle (United States; modern)
- M9 bulldozer mounted on the M60 chassis (United States; Cold War)
- M10 tank destroyer based on the M4 Sherman chassis (United States; World War II)
- M11/39 light tank (Italy; World War II)
- M11 4×4 armoured personnel vehicle based on the VBL (France; Cold War)
- M12 gun motor carriage self-propelled 155 mm howitzer on M3 Grant chassis (United States; World War II)
- M13 multiple gun motor carriage anti-aircraft vehicle (United States; World War II)
- M13/40 light tank (Italy; World War II)
- M14/41 light tank (Italy; World War II)
- M15 CMGC anti-aircraft vehicle (United States; World War II)
- M15/42 medium tank (Italy; World War II)
- M16 MGMC anti-aircraft vehicle (United States; World War II)
- M18 Hellcat self-propelled 76 mm anti-tank gun (United States; World War II)
- M19 self-propelled twin 40 mm gun mounted on the M24 Chaffee chassis (United States; World War II/Cold War)
- M20 6×6 armoured utility vehicle based on the M8 Greyhound chassis (United States; World War II)
- M21 halftrack self-propelled 81 mm mortar carrier (United States; World War II)
- M22 Locust airmobile light tank (United States; World War II)
- M24 Chaffee light tank (United States; World War II)
- M26 Pershing tank (United States; World War II/Korean War)
- M26 tractor, component of the M25 tank transporter/recovery vehicle nicknamed "Dragon Wagon" (United States; World War II/Cold War)
- M29 Weasel cargo carrier (United States; World War II)
- M31 Honest John rocket carrier (United States; Cold War)
- M32 ARV armoured recovery vehicle (United States; World War II)
- M34 6×6 2.5 ton truck (United States; Cold War)
- M35 6×6 2.5 ton truck (United States; Cold War)
- M36 Jackson self-propelled 90 mm anti-tank gun (United States; World War II/Cold War)
- M36 Nike-Hercules Missile launcher-loader (United States; Cold War)
- M36 6×6 2.5 ton truck (United States; Cold War)
- M37 light utility vehicle (United States; Cold War)
- M38 Wolfhound 6×6 armoured car (United States; World War II)
- M38 Willys Jeep 4×4 utility vehicle (United States; Cold War)
- M39 6×6 5 ton truck (United States; Cold War)
- M39 armoured utility vehicle converted M18 Hellcat (United States)
- M40 GMC self-propelled gun (United States; World War II)
- M40 6×6 5 ton truck (United States; Cold War)
- M41 Walker Bulldog light tank (United States; Cold War)
- M41 Self-propelled M114 155 mm howitzer based on the M24 Chaffee chassis (United States; Cold War)
- M41 6×6 5 ton truck (United States; Cold War)
- M42 Duster self-propelled twin 40 mm anti-aircraft guns (United States; Cold War)
- M/42 4×4 armoured personnel carrier (also known as KP) (Sweden; World War II)
- M42 4×4 command vehicle (United States; Cold War)
- M43 4×4 ambulance (United States; Cold War)
- M44 self-propelled 155 mm howitzer on the M41 Walker Bulldog chassis (United States; Cold War)
- M44 6×6 2.5 ton truck (United States; Cold War)
- M45 armoured serving and refuelling vehicle based on the M548 (United States; Cold War)
- M45 6×6 2.5 ton truck (United States; Cold War)
- M46 Patton medium Tank (United States; Korean War/Cold War)
- M46 6×6 2.5 ton truck (United States; Cold War)
- M47 Patton medium tank (United States; Cold War)
- M47 6×6 dump truck (United States; Cold War)
- M48 Patton medium tank (United States; Vietnam War/Cold War)
- M48 Chaparral tracked surface-to-air missile carrier (United States; Cold War)
- M48 6×6 truck tractor (United States; Cold War)
- M49 Otter amphibious cargo/troop carrier (United States; Cold War)
- M49 6×6 fuel tanker (United States; Cold War)
- M50 Super Sherman medium tank based on the M4 Sherman (Israel; Cold War)
- M50 Honest John rocket launcher (United States; Cold War)
- M50 Ontos Self-propelled 106 mm Recoilless Rifle
- M50 6×6 water tanker (United States; Cold War)
- M51 Super Sherman medium tank based on the M4 Sherman (Israel; Cold War)
- M51 Recovery vehicle (United States; Cold War)
- M51 6×6 dump truck (United States; Cold War)
- M52 self-propelled 105 mm Howitzer on a M41 chassis (United States; Cold War)
- M52 6×6 tractor (United States; Cold War)
- M53 Long Tom self-propelled 155 mm howitzer (United States; Cold War)
- M-53 6×6 self-propelled twin 30 mm anti-aircraft guns based on a V3 Praga (Czechoslovakia; Cold War)
- M54 Self-propelled 105 mm field gun (United States; Cold War)
- M54 6×6 5 ton truck (United States; Cold War)
- M-55 main battle tank based on the T-55 (Slovenia; Cold War)
- M55 6×6 5 ton truck (United States; Cold War)
- M56 Scorpion anti-tank vehicle carrying either a 90 mm anti-tank gun or a 106 mm recoilless rifle (United States; Cold War)
- M56 4×4 utility vehicle (United States; Cold War)
- M57 6×6 2.5 ton Truck (United States; Cold War)
- M58 smoke generator vehicle based on the M113 (United States; Cold War)
- M59 armoured personnel carrier (United States; Cold War)
- M59 6×6 dump truck (United States; Cold War)
- M59 4×4 utility vehicle (Romania; Cold War)
- M60 Patton main battle tank (United States; Cold War)
- M-60 armoured personnel carrier (previously known as the M-590) (Yugoslavia; Cold War)
- M60 6×6 wrecker/tow truck (United States; Cold War)
- M61 6×6 5 ton truck (United States; Cold War)
- M62 6×6 wrecker/tow truck (United States; Cold War)
- M63 6×6 5 ton truck (United States; Cold War)
- M64 6×6 5 ton truck (United States; Cold War)
- M66 Medium Tank (United States; Cold War)
- M67 Medium flamethrower Tank based on the M48 chassis
- M70 Main Battle tank (United States/Germany; Cold War/modern)
- M74 armoured recovery vehicle based on the M4 chassis (United States; Cold War)
- M75 armoured personnel carrier (United States; Cold War)
- M76 Otter amphibious cargo carrier (United States; Cold War)
- M-77 main battle tank based on the T-55 (Romania; Cold War)
- M-80 infantry fighting vehicle based on the BMP-1 (previous known as the M-980) (Yugoslavia; Cold War)
- M-84 main battle tank based on the T-72 (Yugoslavia; Cold War/modern)
- M84 self-propelled 105 mm mortar (United States; Cold War)
- M85 wheeled truck tractor (United States; Cold War)
- M88 armoured recovery vehicle (United States; Cold War)
- M91 self-propelled multiple rocket launcher on a 6×6 2.5 ton Truck (United States; Cold War)
- M-94 Plamen-S self-propelled multiple rocket launcher on a 6×6 truck (Yugoslavia)
- M95 Degman main battle tank (Croatia; modern)
- M93 Fox 6×6 armoured reconnaissance vehicle (Germany; Cold War)
- M102 armoured engineering vehicle based on a M47 chassis (United States; Cold War)
- M103 heavy tank (United States; Cold War)
- M104 self-propelled 105 mm howitzer (United States; Cold War)
- M106 self-propelled 107 mm mortar in a M113 vehicle (United States; Cold War)
- M107 self-propelled 175 mm gun (United States; Cold War)
- M108 self-propelled 105 mm howitzer (United States; Cold War)
- M108 6×6 2.5 ton radio repair truck (United States; Cold War)
- M108 6×6 wrecker/tow truck (United States; Cold War)
- M109 self-propelled 155 mm howitzer (United States; Cold War)
- M109 6×6 2.5 ton Truck (United States; Cold War)
- M110 self-propelled 203 mm howitzer (United States; Cold War)
- M113 armoured personnel carrier (United States; Cold War)
- M114 command and reconnaissance vehicle (United States; Cold War)
- M116 amphibious personnel carrier (United States; Cold War)
- M123 6×6 truck tractor (United States; Cold War)
- M124 6×6 2.5 ton radio repair truck (United States; Cold War)
- M125 6×6 10 ton truck (United States; Cold War)
- M125 self-propelled 81 mm mortar (United States; Cold War)
- M132 armoured flamethrower based on the M113 (United States; Cold War)
- M132 6×6 medical vehicle (United States; Cold War)
- M133 6×6 canteen vehicle (Canada; Cold War)
- M135 6×6 2.5 ton truck (United States; Cold War)
- M139 6×6 transporter for the Honest John rocket (United States; Cold War)
- M139 6×6 bridge layer (United States; Cold War)
- M147 amphibious 5 ton truck (United States; Cold War)
- M151 4×4 utility vehicle (United States; Vietnam)
- M152 4×4 radio and command utility vehicle (Canada; Cold War)
- M162 Vulcan Air Defence System based on the M732 (United States; Cold War)
- M163 VADS Vulcan Air Defence System based on the M732 (United States; Cold War)
- M170 4×4 utility vehicle (United States; Cold War)
- M185 6×6 repair vehicle (United States; Cold War)
- M195 self-propelled 105 mm howitzer (United States; Cold War)
- M201 4×4 utility vehicle (United States; Cold War)
- M211 6×6 2.5 ton truck (United States; Cold War)
- M215 6×6 dump truck (United States; Cold War)
- M216 6×6 fuel tanker (United States; Cold War)
- M217 6×6 fuel tanker (United States; Cold War)
- M220 6×6 2.5 ton truck (United States; Cold War)
- M221 6×6 truck tractor (United States; Cold War)
- M222 6×6 water tanker (United States; Cold War)
- M-240 Storm 4×4 utility vehicle based on the Jeep Wrangler YJ (Israel; Cold War/modern)
- M-242 Storm Mark II/III 4×4 utility vehicle based on the Jeep Wrangler TJ (Israel; modern)
- M246 6×6 wrecker/tow truck (United States; Cold War)
- M249 heavy transporter (United States; Cold War)
- M250 heavy transporter (United States; Cold War)
- M268 6×6 propellant tanker (United States; Cold War)
- M270 self-propelled multiple rocket launcher (France, Germany, United Kingdom and United States; Cold War/modern)
- M274 Mule 4×4 utility vehicle (United States; Cold War)
- M275 6×6 truck tractor (United States; Cold War)
- M283 4×4 utility vehicle (United States; Cold War)
- M289 wheeled missile launcher truck (United States; Cold War)
- M291 6×6 5 ton truck (United States; Cold War)
- M292 6×6 2.5 ton truck (United States; Cold War)
- M328 6×6 bridge layer (United States; Cold War)
- M342 6×6 dump truck (United States; Cold War)
- M348 6×6 dump truck (United States; Cold War)
- M382 6×6 bridging layer (United States; Cold War)
- M386 6×6 rocket launcher with single Honest John rocket (United States; Cold War)
- M422 Mighty Mite 4×4 utility vehicle (United States; Vietnam)
- M462 4×4 utility vehicle (also known as the Abir and Rhino) (Israel; Cold War/modern)
- M474 self-propelled medium range ballistic missile launcher with a MGM-31 Pershing missile based on a M113 (United States; Cold War)
- M501 MIM-23 Hawk transporter and loader (United States; Cold War)
- M512 6×6 2.5 ton truck (United States; Cold War)
- M520 Goer 4×4 8 ton articulated truck (United States; Cold War)
- M521 Self-propelled 105 mm howitzer (United States; Cold War)
- M523 wheeled truck tractor (United States; Cold War)
- M543 6×6 wrecker/tow truck (United States; Cold War)
- M546 self-propelled surface-to-air missile vehicle with MIM-46 missiles based on a M113 (United States; Cold War)
- M548 cargo vehicle based on a M113 (United States; Cold War)
- M551 Sheridan Armored Airborne Reconnaissance Assault Vehicle (United States; Vietnam War/ Cold War)
- M553 Goer 4×4 articulated wrecker recovery vehicle (United States; Cold War)
- M559 4×4 articulated fuel tanker based on the M520 Goer (United States; Cold War)
- M561 Gama Goat 6×6 articulated truck (United States; Cold War)
- M577 command vehicle based on the M113 (United States; Cold War/modern)
- M578 light armoured recovery vehicle (United States; Cold War)
- M579 repair vehicle based on the M113 (United States; Cold War)
- M-590 (previous designation of the M-60)
- M601 4×4 power generator carrier (United States; Cold War)
- M602 6×6 2.5 ton truck (United States; Cold War)
- M606 Willys Jeep 4×4 utility vehicle (United States; Cold War)
- M615 4×4 wheeled ambulance (United States; Cold War)
- M621 6×6 2.5 ton Truck (United States; Cold War)
- M622 6×6 fuel tanker (United States; Cold War)
- M623 6×6 2.5 ton truck (United States; Cold War)
- M624 6×6 dump truck (United States; Cold War)
- M656 8×8 5 ton air-transportable and floatable truck (United States; Cold War)
- M667 self-propelled missile launcher carrying the MGM-52 Lance surface-to-surface missile (United States; Cold War)
- M688 supply vehicle for the MGM-52 Lance surface-to-surface missile based on the M113 (United States; Cold War)
- M696 recovery vehicle based on the M548 (United States; Cold War)
- M706 4×4 armoured vehicle (also known as the V-100 Commando (United States; Cold War)
- M715 Jeep 4×4 utility vehicle (United States; Cold War)
- M718 4×4 ambulance based on the M151 jeep (United States; Cold War)
- M724 Jeep 4×4 utility vehicle (United States; Cold War)
- M725 Jeep 4×4 ambulance (United States; Cold War)
- M726 Jeep 4×4 maintenance vehicle (United States; Cold War)
- M727 self-propelled surface-to-air missile launcher with MIM-23 Hawk missiles based on the M113 (United States; Cold War)
- M728 CEV combat engineer vehicle (United States; Cold War/modern)
- M730 carrier for the M48 Chaparral launcher based on the M113 (United States; Cold War)
- M732 self-propelled M162 Vulcan Air Defence System based on the M113 (United States; Cold War)
- M734 infantry fighting vehicle based on the M113 (United States; Cold War)
- M741 self-propelled M163 Vulcan Air Defence System based on the M113 (United States; Cold War)
- M748 6×6 5 ton truck (United States; Cold War)
- M751 6×6 2.5 ton truck (United States; Cold War)
- M752 self-propelled MGM-52 Lance surface-to-surface missile launcher based on the M113 (United States; Cold War)
- M756 6×6 pipeline maintenance vehicle (United States; Cold War)
- M757 8×8 truck tractor (United States; Cold War)
- M763 6×6 telephone maintenance vehicle (United States; Cold War)
- M764 6×6 earth boring maintenance vehicle (United States; Cold War)
- M791 8×8 5 ton truck (United States; Cold War)
- M792 4×4 articulated ambulance based on the M520 Goer (United States; Cold War)
- M806 armoured recovery vehicle based on the M113 (United States; Cold War)
- M809 6×6 5 ton truck (United States; Cold War)
- M810 6×6 5 ton truck (United States; Cold War)
- M811 6×6 5 ton truck (United States; Cold War)
- M812 6×6 5 ton truck (United States; Cold War)
- M813 6×6 5 ton truck (United States; Cold War)
- M814 6×6 5 ton truck (United States; Cold War)
- M815 6×6 5 ton truck (United States; Cold War)
- M816 wrecker/tow truck (United States; Cold War)
- M817 6×6 dump truck (United States; Cold War)
- M818 6×6 truck tractor (United States; Cold War)
- M819 6×6 wrecker/tow truck (United States; Cold War)
- M820 6×6 5 ton truck (United States; Cold War)
- M821 6×6 bridge transporter (United States; Cold War)
- M825 4×4 self-propelled recoilless rifle based on the M151 (United States; Cold War)
- M877 Goer 4×4 articulated truck (United States; Cold War)
- M880 4×4 utility vehicle based on the Dodge pickup truck (United States; Cold War)
- M881 4×4 utility vehicle based on the Dodge pickup truck (United States; Cold War)
- M882 4×4 utility vehicle based on the Dodge pickup truck (United States; Cold War)
- M883 4×4 utility vehicle based on the Dodge pickup truck (United States; Cold War)
- M884 4×4 utility vehicle based on the Dodge pickup truck (United States; Cold War)
- M885 4×4 utility vehicle based on the Dodge pickup truck (United States; Cold War)
- M886 4×4 Ambulance based on the Dodge pickup truck (United States; Cold War)
- M887 4×4 Maintenance vehicle based on the Dodge pickup truck (United States; Cold War)
- M888 4×4 Telephone Maintenance vehicle based on the Dodge pickup truck (United States; Cold War)
- M890 4×2 utility vehicle based on the Dodge pickup truck (United States; Cold War)
- M891 4×2 utility vehicle based on the Dodge pickup truck (United States; Cold War)
- M892 4×2 utility vehicle based on the Dodge pickup truck (United States; Cold War)
- M893 4×2 ambulance based on the Dodge pickup truck (United States; Cold War)
- M901 ITV self-propelled TOW missile launcher based on the M113 (United States; Cold War)
- M915 6×4 truck tractor, line haul (United States; Cold War)
- M916 6×6 truck tractor, w/winch (United States; Cold War)
- M917 8×6 truck chassis, for 20-ton dump truck (United States; Cold War)
- M918 6×6 truck chassis, for 1,500 gallon bituminous distributor (United States; Cold War)
- M919 8×6 truck chassis, for concrete mobile mixer (United States; Cold War)
- M920 8×6 truck tractor, MET, w/winch (United States; Cold War)
- M923 6×6 5 ton truck (United States; Cold War/modern)
- M924 6×6 5 ton truck (United States; Cold War/modern)
- M925 6×6 5 ton truck (United States; Cold War/modern)
- M926 6×6 5 ton truck (United States; Cold War/modern)
- M927 6×6 5 ton truck (United States; Cold War/modern)
- M928 6×6 5 ton truck (United States; Cold War/modern)
- M929 6×6 dump truck (United States; Cold War/modern)
- M930 6×6 dump truck (United States; Cold War/modern)
- M931 6×6 truck tractor (United States; Cold War/modern)
- M932 6×6 truck tractor (United States; Cold War/modern)
- M933 6×6 truck tractor (United States; Cold War/modern)
- M934 6×6 5 ton truck (United States; Cold War/modern)
- M935 6×6 5 ton truck (United States; Cold War/modern)
- M936 6×6 wrecker/tow truck (United States; Cold War/modern)
- M939 6×6 5 ton truck (United States; Cold War/modern)
- M940 6×6 5 ton truck (United States; Cold War/modern)
- M941 6×6 5 ton truck (United States; Cold War/modern)
- M944 6×6 5 ton truck (United States; Cold War/modern)
- M945 6×6 5 ton truck (United States; Cold War/modern)
- M966 4×4 self-propelled TOW missile launcher based on the HMMWV (United States; Cold War/modern)
- M973 4×4 self-propelled Stinger surface-to-air missile launcher based on the HMMWV (United States; Cold War/modern)
- M977 HEMTT 8×8 10 ton heavy truck (United States; modern)
- M978 HEMTT 8×8 fuel tanker (United States; modern)
- M-980 (previous designation of the M-80)
- M981 FISTV self-propelled TOW missile launcher based on the M113 (United States; Cold War/modern)
- M983 HEMAT 8×8 tractor-trailer ammunition vehicle (United States; modern)
- M984 HEMTT 8×8 10 ton wrecker recovery vehicle (United States; modern)
- M985 HEMTT 8×8 10 ton truck with crane (United States; modern)
- M992 FAASV ammunition vehicle (United States; Cold War/modern)
- M993 self-propelled multiple rocket launcher (France, Germany, United Kingdom and United States; modern)
- M996 4×4 ambulance based on the HMMWV (United States; Cold War/modern)
- M997 4×4 ambulance based on the HMMWV (United States; Cold War/modern)
- M998 HMMWV 4×4 utility vehicle (United States; Cold War/modern)
- M1001 8×8 truck tractor (United States; Cold War/modern)
- M1002 8×8 wrecker recovery Truck (United States; Cold War/modern)
- M1008 4×4 utility vehicle based on the General Motors Model K30903 (United States; Cold War/modern)
- M1009 4×4 utility vehicle based on the Chevrolet K5 Blazer (United States; Cold War/modern)
- M1010 4×4 ambulance based on the M1008 (United States; Cold War/modern)
- M1015 electronic warfare systems carrier based on the M113 (United States; Cold War/modern)
- M1025 HMMWV 4×4 weapon carrier (United States; Cold War/modern)
- M1026 HMMWV 4×4 weapon carrier (United States; Cold War/modern)
- M1028 HMMWV 4×4 electronic systems carrier (United States; Cold War/modern)
- M1031 4×4 utility vehicle based on the M1008 (United States; Cold War/modern)
- M1035 HMMWV 4×4 ambulance (United States; Cold War/modern)
- M1036 4×4 self-propelled TOW missile launcher based on the HMMWV (United States; Cold War/modern)
- M1037 HMMWV 4×4 shelter carrier (United States; Cold War/modern)
- M1038 HMMWV 4×4 utility vehicle (United States; Cold War/modern)
- M1042 HMMWV 4×4 shelter carrier (United States; Cold War/modern)
- M1043 HMMWV 4×4 weapon carrier (United States; Cold War/modern)
- M1044 HMMWV 4×4 weapon carrier (United States; Cold War/modern)
- M1045 4×4 self-propelled TOW missile launcher based on the HMMWV (United States; Cold War/modern)
- M1046 4×4 self-propelled TOW missile launcher based on the HMMWV (United States; Cold War/modern)
- M1059 smoke generator vehicle based on the M113 (United States; Cold War/modern)
- M1064 self-propelled 120 mm mortar based on the M113 (United States; Cold War/modern)
- M1068 command vehicle based on the M113 (United States; Cold War/modern)
- M1069 HMMWV 4×4 light artillery mover (United States; Cold War/modern)
- M1070 Bradley electronic warfare systems carrier (United States; modern)
- M1070 Heavy Equipment Transporter, truck tractor (United States; modern)
- M1078 FMTV truck series (United States; modern)
- M1097 HMMWV 4×4 utility vehicle (United States; Cold War/modern)
- M1097 Avenger, self-propelled air-defence vehicle with FIM-92 Stinger missiles on the HMMWV chassis (United States; modern)
- M1108 armoured carrier based on the M113 (United States; Cold War/modern)
- M1109 HMMWV 4×4 weapon carrier (United States; modern)
- M1113 HMMWV 4×4 utility vehicle (United States; modern)
- M1114 HMMWV 4×4 weapon carrier with improved armour protection (United States; modern)
- M1115 HMMWV 4×4 self-propelled TOW missile launcher based on the HMMWV (United States; modern)
- M1116 4×4 armoured security vehicle based on the HMMWV (United States; modern)
- M1117 Guardian 4×4 armoured security vehicle based on the V-100 Commando (United States; modern)
- M1120 8×8 load handling system based on the HEMTT (United States; modern)
- M1121 HMMWV 4×4 self-propelled TOW missile launcher based on the HMMWV (United States; modern)
- M1123 HMMWV 4×4 utility vehicle (United States; modern)
- M1124 HMMWV 4×4 utility vehicle (United States; modern)
- M1151 HMMWV 4×4 weapon carrier (United States; modern)
- M1152 HMMWV 4×4 utility vehicle (United States; modern)
- M1917 (American service designation for the Renault FT-17)
- M1919 light tank (United States; pre–World War II)
- M1921 medium tank prototype (also known as Medium A) (United States; pre–World War II)
- M1921 light tank (United States; pre–World War II)
- M1922 medium tank prototype (also known as Medium A) (United States; pre–World War II)
- M1923 medium tank prototype (also known as Medium A) (United States; pre–World War II)
- M1924 medium tank prototype (also known as Medium A) (United States; pre–World War II)
- M1928 light tank (United States; pre–World War II)
- M1931 light tank (United States; pre–World War II)
- M1932 light tank (United States; pre–World War II)
- M1932 4×2 armoured 5 ton truck based on the Standard B Liberty truck (United States; pre–World War II)
- M1933 airborne armoured vehicle (United States; pre–World War II)
- M1937 light tank (United States; pre–World War II)
- M1945 NATO reporting name for the T-34 medium tank (Soviet Union; World War II)
- M1946 NATO reporting name for the T-54 main battle tank (Soviet Union; Cold War)
- M1947 NATO reporting name for the T-34 medium tank (Poland; Cold War)
- M1949 NATO reporting name for the T-54 main battle tank (Soviet Union; Cold War)
- M1951 NATO reporting name for the T-54 main battle tank (Soviet Union; Cold War)
- M1953 NATO reporting name for the T-54 main battle tank (Soviet Union; Cold War)
- M1956 NATO reporting name for the BTR-40 4×4 armoured personnel carrier (Soviet Union; Cold War)
- M1957 NATO reporting name for the BTR-40 4×4 armoured personnel carrier (Soviet Union; Cold War)
- M1958 NATO reporting name for the BRDM-1 4×4 reconnaissance vehicle (Soviet Union; Cold War)
- M1959 NATO reporting name for the BRDM-1 4×4 reconnaissance vehicle (Soviet Union; Cold War)
- M1960 NATO reporting name for the BRDM-1 4×4 reconnaissance vehicle (Soviet Union; Cold War)
- M1964 NATO reporting name for the ZSU-23-4 self-propelled anti-aircraft 23 mm guns (Soviet Union; Cold War)
- M1965 NATO reporting name for the ZSU-23-4 self-propelled anti-aircraft 23 mm guns (Soviet Union; Cold War)
- M1968 NATO reporting name for the ZSU-23-4 self-propelled anti-aircraft 23 mm guns (Soviet Union; Cold War)
- M1970 NATO reporting name for the T-55 main battle tank (Soviet Union; Cold War)
- M1970 NATO reporting name for the T-34 medium tank (Poland; Cold War)
- M1971 NATO reporting name for the 2S1 Gvozdika self-propelled 122 mm howitzer (Soviet Union; Cold War)
- M1972 NATO reporting name for the ZSU-23-4 self-propelled anti-aircraft 23 mm guns (Soviet Union; Cold War)
- M1973 NATO reporting name for the 2S3 Akatsiya self-propelled 152 mm howitzer (Soviet Union; Cold War)
- M1974 NATO reporting name for the 2S1 Gvozdika self-propelled 122 mm howitzer (Soviet Union; Cold War)
- M1975 8×8 heavy dry support bridge launcher based on the HEMTT (United States; modern)
- M1975 NATO reporting name for the 2S7 Pion self-propelled 203 mm howitzer (Soviet Union; Cold War)
- M1975 NATO reporting name for the 2S4 Tyulpan self-propelled 240 mm mortar (Soviet Union; Cold War)
- M1975/4 NATO reporting name for the BTR-40 4×4 armoured personnel carrier (Cuba; Cold War)
- M1977 NATO reporting name for the ZSU-23-4 self-propelled anti-aircraft 23 mm guns (Soviet Union; Cold War)
- M1977 8×8 common bridge transporter based on the HEMTT (United States; modern)
- M1978 NATO reporting name for the T-64 main battle tank (Soviet Union; Cold War)
- M1979 NATO reporting name for the MTK-2 mine clearing vehicle (Soviet Union; Cold War)
- M1978 NATO reporting name for the BTR-70 8×8 armoured personnel carrier (Soviet Union; Cold War)
- M1981 NATO reporting name for the 2S5 Giatsint-S self-propelled 152 mm gun (Soviet Union; Cold War)
- M1980/1 NATO reporting name for the T-72 main battle tank (Soviet Union; Cold War)
- M1980/2 NATO reporting name for the T-64 main battle tank (Soviet Union; Cold War)
- M1981/3 NATO reporting name for the T-72 main battle tank (Soviet Union; Cold War)
- M1984 NATO reporting name for the T-72 main battle tank (Soviet Union; Cold War)
- M1984 NATO reporting name for the Type 59 main battle tank (China; Cold War/modern)
- M1984 NATO reporting name for the BTR-70 8×8 armoured personnel carrier (Soviet Union; Cold War)
- M1984 NATO reporting name for the WZ523 6×6 armoured personnel carrier (China; Cold War/modern)
- M1985 NATO reporting name for the Type 55 main battle tank (Soviet Union; Cold War)
- M1985 NATO reporting name for a light tank based on the VTT-323 (China; Cold War/modern)
- M1985 NATO reporting name for the ZSU-23-4 self-propelled anti-aircraft 23 mm guns (Soviet Union; Cold War)
- M1986 NATO reporting name for the T-72 main battle tank (Soviet Union; Cold War)
- M1986 NATO reporting name for the T-55 main battle tank (Soviet Union; Cold War)
- M1986 NATO reporting name for the BTR-70 8×8 armoured personnel carrier (Soviet Union; Cold War/modern)
- M1986 NATO reporting name for the Tunguska-M1 self-propelled twin 30 mm anti-aircraft guns and missiles (Soviet Union; Cold War/modern)
- M1988 NATO reporting name for the T-72 main battle tank (Soviet Union; Cold War)
- M1990 NATO reporting name for the T-72 main battle tank (Soviet Union; Cold War)
- M-2001 Main Battle Tank (Serbia; modern)
- MAC-1 4×4 armoured car (United States; Cold War)
- MAC-2 4×4 armoured car based on the MAC-1 (Spain; Cold War)
- Mae West (popular name for the M2 Light Tank)
- Magach main battle tank (Israel; Cold War)
- Majnoon self-propelled 155 mm howitzer (Iraq; modern)
- Mamba mine proof wheeled armoured personnel carrier (South Africa; modern)
- MAR 240 self-propelled multiple rocket launcher based on a M4 Sherman chassis (Israel; Cold War)
- MAR 290 self-propelled multiple rocket launcher based on a M4 Sherman chassis (Israel; Cold War)
- Marauder (vehicle) armoured vehicle
- Marder II self-propelled 75 mm antitank gun on a Panzer II chassis (Germany; World War II)
- Marder (IFV) infantry fighting vehicle (Germany; Cold War/modern)
- Mark I series of tanks (United Kingdom; World War I)
- Mark VIII Liberty (Anglo-American version of the Mark I (tank))
- Mark IX tank armoured personnel carrier (United Kingdom; World War I)
- Mark E light tank (also known as the Vickers 6 ton) (United Kingdom; pre–World War II)
- Matador armoured vehicle
- Maverick internal security vehicle
- MAZ-543 8×8 transport/launcher of the Scud short range ballistic missile (also known as the 9P117) (Soviet Union; Cold War)
- MB Willys Jeep 4×4 Utility Vehicle (related to Ford GPW)(United States and United Kingdom; World War II)
- MB-3 Tamoio main battle tank (Brazil; Cold War/modern)
- Mbombe armoured vehicle
- MBP 8×8 armoured security vehicle based on the BTR-70 (Soviet Union; Cold War)
- MBT-70 prototype main battle tank (United States and Germany; Cold War, cancelled)
- MBT-80 prototype main battle tank (also known as the FV4601) (United Kingdom; Cold War)
- MBT-2000 main battle tank (also known as the Al-Khalid) (China and Pakistan; modern)
- MCV-80 (early designation for the FV510 Warrior)
- MDT David 4×4 armoured utility vehicle based on the Land Rover Defender (United States; modern)
- Medium A medium tank prototypes (also known as M1921, M1922, M1923 and M1924) (United States; pre–World War II)
- Medium Mark A (official designation for the Whippet Mk A)
- Medium Mark B medium tank (United Kingdom; World War I)
- Medium Mark C medium tank (United Kingdom; World War I)
- Merkava main battle tank (Israel; modern)
- MEX-1 4×4 armoured car based on the MAC-1 (United States; Cold War)
- Mk 48 LVS 10 ton truck (United States; modern)
- Mk 61 self-propelled 105 mm gun (France; Cold War)
- Mk F3 self-propelled 155 mm gun (France; Cold War)
- MLI-84 infantry fighting vehicle based on the BMP-1 (Soviet Union; Cold War) (Romania; Cold War / modern)
- MLRS (acronym for the M270 and M993 Multiple Launch Rocket System)
- MLVM armoured personnel carrier (Romania; Cold War)
- MLVW 6×6 2.5 ton truck series (Canada and United States; modern)
- Mobile Gun System version of the Stryker AFV mounting a 105 mm tank gun
- Mowag Grenadier wheeled armoured personnel carrier (Switzerland; Cold War)
- Mowag Piranha wheeled armoured personnel carrier (Switzerland; Cold War/modern)
- Mowag Roland wheeled APC (Switzerland; Cold War)
- Mowag Shark wheeled combat vehicle (Switzerland; modern)
- Mowag SPY wheeled light reconnaissance vehicle (Switzerland; modern)
- Mowag Tornado infantry fighting vehicle (Switzerland; modern)
- MP-31armoured staff vehicle based on the BMP-1 (Soviet Union; Cold War)
- MPAEJ 8×8 combat engineering vehicle based on the BTR-80 (Hungary; Cold War)
- MPFJ 8×8 obstacle clearing vehicle based on the BTR-80 (Hungary; Cold War)
- MRAP Mine Resistant Ambush Protected
- MT-55 bridging vehicle (Czechoslovakia and Soviet Union; Cold War)
- MTK-2 mine clearing vehicle based on the 2S1 chassis (Soviet Union; Cold War)
- MT-LB armoured personnel carrier (Soviet Union; Cold War)
- MT-LBu armoured multi-purpose carrier (Soviet Union; Cold War)
- MTP-3 armoured recovery vehicle based on the IT-122 (Soviet Union; Cold War)
- MTU-20 bridging vehicle based on the T-55 (Soviet Union; Cold War)
- MTU-72 bridge layer vehicle based on the T-72 (Soviet Union; Cold War)
- MTVC cargo carrier based on the MTVL (United States; modern)
- MTVF engineering vehicle based on the MTVL (United States; modern)
- MTVL armoured vehicle based on the M113 (United States; modern)
- MTVR six-wheel drive all-terrain vehicle that replaced the M939 (United States; modern)
- MU-90 mine layer vehicle based on the OT-90 (Czechoslovakia; Cold War)
- Mungo ESK wheeled armoured personnel carrier (Germany; modern)
- MVJ 8×8 armoured recovery vehicle based on the BTR-80 (Hungary; Cold War)

== N ==
- "Nahuel" D.L. 43 medium tank (Argentina; World War II)
- Nashorn (Hornisse) tank destroyer (Germany; World War II)
- NGV-1 6×6 infantry fighting vehicle based on the WZ551 (China; modern)
- NJ2045 4×4 utility vehicle (China; modern)
- NJ2046 4×4 utility vehicle based on the Iveco 40.19WM (China; modern)
- NM-142 infantry fighting vehicle based on the M113 (Norway; Cold War)
- NM-142 self-propelled anti-tank vehicle with TOW2 missiles based on the M113 (Norway; Cold War)
- NVH-1 infantry combat vehicle (China; modern)
- Nyala (popular name for the RG-31)
- NZLAV 8×8 infantry fighting vehicle based on the LAV III (Canada; modern)

== O ==
- OF-40 main battle tank (Italy; Cold War)
- OF-120 main battle tank (Italy; modern)
- Ogum (popular name for the EE-T4 Ogum)
- Olifant Mk 1B main battle tank (South Africa; Cold War/modern)
- Orca (popular name for the VTP-1 Orca)
- Osorio (popular name for the EE-T1 Osório series)
- OT-54 flamethrower tank based on the T-54 (Soviet Union; Cold War)
- OT-55 flamethrower tank based on the T-55 (Soviet Union; Cold War)
- OT-62 armoured personnel carrier based on the BTR-50 (Czechoslovakia and Poland; Cold War)
- OT-64 SKOT armoured personnel carrier based on the BTR-60 (Czechoslovakia and Poland; Cold War)
- OT-65 4×4 reconnaissance vehicle (Czechoslovakia and Hungary; Cold War)
- OT-90 armoured personnel carrier based on the BMP-1 (Czechoslovakia; Cold War)

== P ==
- P4 4×4 utility vehicle based on the Mercedes-Benz G-Class (France; Cold War)
- P26/40 (alternate designation for the Carro Armato P 40)
- P40 medium tank (also known as the Carro Pesante P26/40) (Italy; World War II)
- P-90 (alternative designation for the Al-Khalid main battle tank) (Chaina and Pakistan; modern)
- P-240 8×8 switchboard vehicle based on the K1Sh1 (Soviet Union; Cold War)
- Paladin (popular name for later versions of the M109 howitzer)
- Pandur I 6x6 armoured vehicle (Austria; Cold War/modern)
- Pandur II 8×8 armoured vehicle (Austria; modern)
- Pangu (popular name for the XA-180 Pangu)
- Panther (popular name for the Panzer V)
- Panther CLV 4×4 utility vehicle (also known as the LMV Lince) (Italy and United Kingdom; modern)
- Panzer I light tank (Germany; World War II)
- Panzer II light tank (Germany; World War II)
- Panzer III medium tank (Germany; World War II)
- Panzer IV medium tank (Germany; World War II)
- Panzer V Panther main battle tank (Germany; World War II)
- Panzer VI Tiger heavy tank (Germany; World War II)
- Panzer VIII Maus super-heavy tank (Germany; World War II)
- Panzer 35(t) light/medium tank (Czechoslovakia; World War II)
- Panzer 38(t) light/medium tank (Czechoslovakia; World War II)
- Patria AMV 8×8 or 6×6 multi-role military vehicle produced by the Finnish weapons manufacturer Patria
- Patton (popular name for the M46, M47, M48 and M60 Patton-series main battle tanks)
- Pbv 301 armoured personnel carrier (also known as the Pansarbandvagn 301) (Sweden; Cold War)
- Pbv 302 armoured personnel carrier (also known as the Pansarbandvagn 302) (Sweden; Cold War)
- Pbv 401 armoured personnel carrier based on the MT-LB (also known as the Pansarbandvagn 401) (Sweden; Cold War)
- Pegaso 3560 armoured personnel carrier (Spain; Cold War)
- Petit Véhicule Protégé full name for the PVP armoured utility vehicle (France; modern)
- Pilot Bantom 4×4 Utility Vehicle Prototype (United States; pre–World War II)
- Piranha (popular name for the MOWAG Piranha)
- Pizarro (popular name for the Spanish ASCOD infantry fighting vehicle) (Austria and Spain; modern)
- Plasan Sand Cat light armoured vehicle (Israel; modern)
- PLZ-05 self-propelled 155 mm howitzer (China; modern)
- PLZ-07 self-propelled 122 mm howitzer (also known as the Type 07) (China; modern)
- PLZ-45 self-propelled 155 mm howitzer (also known as the Type 88) (China; modern)
- PLZ-89 self-propelled 122 mm howitzer (also known as the Type 89) (China; modern)
- PLL-05 self-propelled mortar (China; modern)
- PGZ-09 self-propelled anti aircraft gun (China; modern)
- PGZ-95 self-propelled anti aircraft gun (China; modern)
- PHL-03 multiple rocket launcher (China; modern)
- PL-01 light tank based on the Swedish CV90120-T (Poland; modern)
- PMCz-90 armoured bridge layer based on the T-72 chassis (Poland; Cold War/modern)
- Poprad air defense missile system (Poland; modern)
- PRP-3 Val artillery reconnaissance vehicle based on the BMP-1 (Soviet Union; Cold War)
- PRP-4 Deyterij artillery reconnaissance vehicle based on the BMP-1 (Soviet Union; Cold War)
- PSZH-IV light wheeled armoured personnel carrier (Hungary; Cold War)
- PT-76 amphibious light tank (Soviet Union; Cold War)
- PT-91 Twardy main battle tank (Poland; modern)
- PT-91M Pendekar main battle tank, Malaysian version of polish PT-91 Twardy (Malaysian; modern)
- PTL02 6×6 armoured car based on the WZ551 (also known as Type 02)(China; modern)
- PU-12M 8×8 air defence command vehicle based on the K1Sh1 (Soviet Union; Cold War)
- Pulse 4×4 ambulance based on the Land Rover Defender 130XD (United Kingdom; modern)
- Puma 4×4 and 6×6 armoured vehicles (Italy; modern)
- Puma 4×4 armoured utility vehicle (South African, Modern)
- PVP armoured 4×4 utility vehicle (France; modern)
- PvBv 551 articulated tractor and trailer with anti-tank missile launcher (also known as PvBv 2063) (Sweden; Cold War)
- PvBv 2062 articulated tractor and trailer with recoilless rifle (Sweden; Cold War)
- PvBv 2063 articulated tractor and trailer with anti-tank missile launcher (also known as PvBv 551) (Sweden; Cold War)
- PvBv 551 articulated tractor and trailer with anti-tank missile launcher (also known as PvBv 2063) (Sweden; Cold War)
- Pz 55 (Swiss designation for the FV4001 Centurion Mk 5)
- Pz 57 (Swiss designation for the FV4001 Centurion Mk 7)
- Pz 58 main battle tank (Switzerland; Cold War)
- Pz 61 main battle tank (Switzerland; Cold War)
- Pz 68 main battle tank (Switzerland; Cold War)
- Pz 87 Leo (Swiss designation for the Leopard I)
- PZA Loara Self-propelled anti-aircraft gun (Poland; modern)
- Pzh 2000 (Panzerhaubitze 2000) Self-propelled artillery (Germany; modern)
- Puma Infantry fighting vehicle (Germany; modern)

== Q ==
- QL550 armoured 4×4 utility vehicle (China; modern)

== R ==
- R-2 (Romanian designation for the Panzer 35(t))
- R3 Capraia armoured car (Italy; Cold War/modern)
- R35 light tank (France; pre–World War II)
- R39 light tank (France; World War II)
- R40 light tank (France; World War II)
- R-149 8×8 signals and command vehicle based on the K1Sh1 (Soviet Union; Cold War)
- R-165 8×8 signals vehicle based on the K1Sh1 (Soviet Union; Cold War)
- R421 mobile radar vehicle based on the Type 60 (China; Cold War)
- R-439 8×8 Sat COM vehicle based on the BTR-80 (Soviet Union; Cold War)
- R914 mobile radar vehicle based on the Type 60 (China; Cold War)
- Ram Mk.I & Mk.II Cruiser tank (Canada; World War II)
- RAM 2000 4×4 scout vehicle (Israel; Cold War)
- Ratel infantry fighting vehicle series (South Africa; Cold War)
- RBY 4×4 scout vehicle (Israel; Cold War)
- Renault FT light tank (France; World War I)
- RGV-9 4×4 armoured vehicle (South Africa; Cold War/modern)
- RG-12 4×4 armoured vehicle (South Africa; modern)
- RG-19 Caddie 4×4 armoured vehicle based on the Unimog 416 (South Africa; Cold War/modern)
- RG-31 Nyala 4×4 and 6×6 mine proof vehicle (South Africa; modern)
- RG-32 Scout 4×4 mine proof vehicle (South Africa; modern)
- RG-33 4×4 and 6×6 mine proof vehicle (South Africa; modern)
- RKhM-4 8×8 NBC reconnaissance vehicle based on the BTR-80 (Soviet Union; Cold War)
- RM-70 8×8 self-propelled multiple rocket launcher (Czechoslovakia; Cold War)
- RN-94 6×6 armoured personnel carrier (Romania - Turkey; modern)
- Rolls-Royce Armoured Car (United Kingdom; World War I)
- Rooikat armoured car (South Africa; modern)
- Rosomak 8×8 IFV (Poland; modern)
- RPX 90 4×4 armoured car (France; modern)
- RPX 3000 4×4 light armoured car (France; modern)
- VPX 5000 tracked light armoured fighting vehicle (France; modern)
- RPX 6000 4×4 armoured car (France; modern)

== S ==
- S52 armoured vehicle based on the Land Rover Defender (Australia and United Kingdom; Cold War)
- S53 air defence vehicle based on the Land Rover Defender (Australia and United Kingdom; Cold War)
- S54 anti-hijack vehicle based on the Land Rover Defender (Australia and United Kingdom; Cold War)
- S55 armoured personnel carrier based on the Land Rover Defender (Australia and United Kingdom; Cold War)
- S600 armoured personnel carrier based on the (Australia and United Kingdom; modern)
- Sabra main battle tank (Israel; Cold War/modern)
- Sabre (tank) member of the CVR(T) family
- Safari (popular name for the Kurierwagen, also known as the Type 181, Type 182, Thing and Trekker)
- Sagaie (popular name for the ERC-90 Sagaie)
- Sakr-18 6×6 self-propelled multiple rocket launcher based on the BM-21 (Egypt; Cold War)
- Saladin (popular name for the FV601 Saladin)
- Samaritan (popular name for the FV104 Samaritan)
- SAMIL 20 4×4 2 ton truck (South Africa; Cold War/modern)
- SAMIL 50 4×4 5 ton truck (South Africa; Cold War/modern)
- SAMIL 100 6×6 10 ton truck (South Africa; Cold War/modern)
- Samson (popular name for the FV106 Samson)
- Sand Cat armoured vehicle (Israel; modern)
- Saracen (popular name for the FV603 Saracen)
- Sarath infantry fighting vehicle based on the BMP-1 (India; Cold War)
- Saur 8×8 armoured personnel carrier (Romania; modern)
- Saxon (popular name for the AT105 Saxon)
- Schneider CA1 tank (France; World War I)
- Schützenpanzer Lang HS.30 armoured personnel carrier (West Germany; Cold War)
- Schwimmwagen (popular name for the Type 128 and Type 166)
- Scimitar (popular name for the FV107 Scimitar)
- Scorpion (popular name for the FV101 Scorpion)
- Scout 4×4 armoured car (United States; Cold War/modern)
- Scout (popular name for the RG-32)
- Sd.Kfz. 101 (vehicle designation for the Panzer I)
- Sd.Kfz. 265 (vehicle designation for the command version of the Panzer I)
- Sea Serpent (British flame-thrower equipped variant of American LVT series of amphibious vehicles)
- Semovente 47 self-propelled 47 mm gun based on the L6/40 chassis (Italy; World War II)
- Semovente 75 self-propelled 75 mm gun based on the M13/40, M14/41 and M15/42 chassis (Italy; World War II)
- Semovente 90 self-propelled 75 mm gun based on the M14/41 chassis (Italy; World War II)
- Semovente 105 self-propelled 105 mm gun based on the M15/42 chassis (Italy; World War II)
- Semovente 149 self-propelled 149 mm gun (Italy; World War II)
- Sexton self-propelled artillery (Canada; World War II)
- SFQ2040 LieYing (Falcon) 4×4 utility vehicle based on the HMMWV (China; modern)
- SH1 6×6 self-propelled 155 mm howitzer (China; modern)
- SH2 6×6 self-propelled 122 mm howitzer (China; modern)
- Shark (popular name for the MOWAG Shark)
- Sheridan (popular name for the M551 Sheridan)
- Sherman (Official UK name for the M4 Medium tank)
- Sherman Firefly medium tank (United Kingdom; World War II)
- Shilka (popular name for the ZSU-23-4)
- ShM-120 Pram self-propelled 120 mm mortar on the BMP-1 chassis (Czechoslovakia; Cold War)
- Shoet wheeled armoured personnel carrier (Israel; modern)
- SIBMAS series of armoured combat vehicles (Belgium; Cold War/modern)
- Simba (APC) (United Kingdom; Cold War)
- SK-105 Kürassier light tank (Austria; Cold War)
- Skeleton tank experimental US tank of 1918
- Skink prototype self-propelled anti-aircraft tank (Canada; World War II)
- Snow Trac Swedish made light tracked vehicle (UK Royal Marines, NATO; Cold War)
- SKOT wheeled armoured personnel carrier (Czechoslovakia/Poland; Cold War)
- SKP-5 mobile crane mounted on the T-55 chassis (Soviet Union; Cold War)
- Spahpanzer Luchs wheeled reconnaissance vehicle (Germany; Cold War)
- Spartan (popular name for the FV103 Spartan)
- SPG-12 mobile crane mounted on the T-55 chassis (Soviet Union; Cold War)
- SPR-2 8×8 electronic warfare vehicle based on the BTR-70 (Soviet Union; Cold War)
- SPW 70 designation for East Germany's BTR-70 (Romania; Cold War)
- MOWAG SPY
- Stallion Medium Duty Logistical and Tactical Defence Vehicle, India
- St Chamond heavy tank (France; World War I)
- Standard B Liberty 4×2 3-5 ton truck (United States; World War I)
- Stingray light tank (United States; modern)
- Storm (popular name for the M-240/M-242 4×4 utility vehicle (Israel; modern)
- Stormer (popular name for the FV4333 Stormer)
- Striker (popular name for the FV102 Striker)
- Stridsvagn m/41 a Czechoslovak TNH tank built in Sweden by Scania-Vabis under license during the Second World War.
- Stridsvagn 74 main battle tank (Sweden; Cold War)
- Stridsvagn 81 (Swedish designation for Mark 3 models of the British Centurion tank)
- Stridsvagn 101 (Swedish designation for Mark 10 models of the British Centurion tank)
- Stridsvagn 102 (Swedish designation for upgraded Mark 3 models of the British Centurion tank)
- Stridsvagn 103 main battle tank (Sweden; Cold War)
- Stridsvagn 104 (Swedish designation for upgraded Stridsvagn 102 tanks, models of the British Centurion tank)
- Stridsvagn 121 (Swedish designation for German Leopard 2A4 tanks which were previously in Bundeswehr service)
- Stridsvagn 122 (Swedish designation for the German Leopard 2 tank)
- Stryker popular name for the Stryker family of wheeled armoured vehicles (United States; modern)
- SU 60 armoured personnel carrier (also known as Type 60) (Japan; Cold War)
- SU-76 tank destroyer (Soviet Union; Second World War)
- SU-85 tank destroyer (Soviet Union; Second World War)
- SU-100 tank destroyer (Soviet Union; Cold War)
- Sultan (popular name for the FV105 Sultan)
- SV 60 self-propelled 81 mm mortar carrier (also known as Type 60) (Japan; Cold War)
- SVO mine clearing vehicle based on the BMP-1 (Czechoslovakia; Cold War)
- SX 60 self-propelled 107 mm mortar carrier (also known as Type 60) (Japan; Cold War)
- SX250 6×6 truck based on the Ural-375 chassis (also known as the SX2150) (China; Cold War)
- SX2110 4×4 3.5 ton truck (China; modern)
- SX2150 6×6 truck based on the Ural-375 chassis (also known as the SX250) (China; Cold War)
- SX2153 6×6 truck based on the Ural-375 chassis (also known as the SX250) (China; Cold War)
- SX2190 6×6 7 ton truck (China; modern)
- SX2270 8×8 12 ton truck (China; modern)
- SX2300 8×8 15 ton truck (China; modern)
- SX4240 6×6 truck tractor based on the Ural-375 chassis (also known as the SX250) (China; Cold War)
- SX4260 6×6 truck tractor (China; modern)

== T ==
- T5 4×4 self-propelled 107 mm mortar based on a M3 Scout Car (United States; pre–World War II)
- T5 armoured vehicle (United States; pre–World War II)
- T6 half-track armoured vehicle (United States; pre–World War II)
- T6 4×2 armoured car (United States; pre–World War II)
- T6 T6 project Tank culminating in the M4 Sherman Tank (United States; World War II)
- T7 4×2 armoured car (United States; pre–World War II)
- T7 4×2 armoured car (United States; pre–World War II)
- T8 4×2 armoured car (United States; pre–World War II)
- T9 4×2 armoured car (United States; pre–World War II)
- T9 4×4 armoured car (United States; pre–World War II)
- T-10 heavy tank (Soviet Union; Cold War)
- T10 4×2 armoured car (also known as the Palmer Car) (United States; pre–World War II)
- T11 4×4 armoured car (United States; pre–World War II)
- T12 4×2 armoured car (United States; pre–World War II)
- T13 4×4 armoured car (United States; pre–World War II)
- T14 heavy tank (United States; World War II)
- T-16 light tank based on the Renault FT (Soviet Union; pre–World War II)
- T17 Deerhound 6×6 armoured car (United States; World War II)
- T17E1 Staghound 4×4 armoured car (United States; World War II)
- T-18 light tank based on the Renault FT (Soviet Union; pre–World War II)
- T18 Boarhound 8×8 armoured car (United States; World War II)
- T-19 prototype light tank based on the T-16/18 (Soviet Union; pre–World War II)
- T-20 prototype light tank based on the T-16/18 (Soviet Union; pre–World War II)
- T19 half-track 105 mm howitzer carrier (United States; World War II)
- T20 T20 series culminating in M26 Medium Tank (United States; World War II)
- T21 6×4 armoured car (United States; World War II)
- T-24 medium tank (Soviet Union; pre–World War II)
- T24 alternative designation for the M24 Chaffee light tank (United States; World War II)
- T22 alternative designation for the M8 Greyhound 6×6 armoured car (United States; World War II)
- T-26 light tank (Soviet Union; pre–World War II)
- T-27 tankette (Soviet Union; World War II)
- T-28 medium tank (Soviet Union; World War II)
- T-34 medium tank (also known as M1943, M1944, M1945 and M1947) (Soviet Union; World War II)
- T-35 heavy tank (Soviet Union; World War II)
- T-37 amphibious light tank (Soviet Union; World War II)
- T-38 amphibious light tank (Soviet Union; World War II)
- T-40 amphibious light tank (Soviet Union; World War II)
- T-43 medium tank (Soviet Union; World War II)
- T-44 medium tank (Soviet Union; World War II)
- T-50 light tank (Soviet Union; World War II)
- T-54 main battle tank (also known as M1946, M1949, M1951, M1953, M1985 and M1986) (Soviet Union; Cold War)
- T-55 main battle tank (also known as M1970) (Soviet Union; Cold War)
- T-60 light tank (Soviet Union; World War II)
- T-62 main battle tank (Soviet Union; Cold War)
- T-64 main battle tank (also known as M1978 and M1980/2) (Soviet Union; Cold War)
- T69 6×6 self-propelled 4 × .50cal anti-aircraft guns based on a M8 (United States; World War II)
- T-70 light tank (Soviet Union; World War II)
- T-72 main battle tank (also known as M1980/1, M1981/3, M1984, M1986, M1988 and M1990) (Soviet Union; Cold War)
- T-80 main battle tank (Soviet Union; Cold War/modern)
- T-80 light tank (Soviet Union; World War II)
- T-84 main battle tank (Ukraine; modern)
- T-90 main battle tank (Russia; modern)
- T-95 main battle tank (Russia; modern)
- T-100 heavy tank prototype (Soviet; pre–World War II)
- T-122 wheeled self-propelled multiple rocket launcher (Turkey; modern)
- TAB-63 8×8 armoured personnel carrier based on the BTR-60 (Romania; Cold War)
- TAB-71 8×8 armoured personnel carrier based on the BTR-60 (Romania; Cold War)
- TAB-72 wheeled APC (Romania; Cold War)
- TAB-73 self-propelled mortar (Romania; Cold War)
- TAB-77 8×8 armoured personnel carrier based on the BTR-70 (Romania; Cold War)
- TABC-79 4×4 armoured personnel carrier is now known as the ABC-79M (Romania; Cold War)
- TAB RN-94 6×6 armoured personnel carrier (Romania - Turkey; modern)
- TAB Saur 8×8 armoured personnel carrier (Romania; modern)
- TAM (Argentine designation for the Thyssen Henschel TH 301)
- Tamoio (popular name for the Bernardini MB-3 Tamoio)
- TAS5130 4×4 5 ton truck (China; Cold War)
- TAS5180 4×4 9 ton truck (China; Cold War)
- TAS5270 6×6 16 ton truck (China; Cold War)
- TAS5380 8×8 20 ton truck (China; modern)
- TAS5380 8×8 transporter and launcher of the HQ-9 surface-to-air missile and WM-80 multiple rockets (China; modern)
- TAS5382 8×8 rocket transporter (China; modern)
- TAS5450 8×8 transporter and launcher of the DF-15 short range ballistic missile and A-100 multiple rockets (China; modern)
- TAS5501/5530 10×10, 10×8, 10×6 30 ton transporter (China; modern)
- TAS5570 10×10 DF-15 short range ballistic missile transporter (China; modern)
- TAS5690 12×12 40 ton truck (China; modern)
- TER-800 armour recovery vehicle based on the TM-800 (Romania)
- TH-200 4×4 armoured car (Germany; Cold War)
- TH 301 medium tank (also known as TAM and VCTan) (Germany; Cold War)
- Tamoio (popular name for the MB-3 Tamoio)
- TH310 ALF-1 4×2 armoured car (United States; pre–World War II)
- TH 400 6×6 reconnaissance vehicle (Germany; modern)
- TH 439 armoured personnel carrier (Germany; modern)
- TH 800 8×8 reconnaissance vehicle (Germany; modern)
- Thing (popular name for the Kurierwagen, also known as the Type 181, Type 182, Safari and Trekker)
- Ti-67 main battle tank based on the T-55 (Israel; Cold War)
- Tiger (popular name for the Panzer VI)
- TILOS VTL armoured logistics vehicle (Italy; modern)
- Timoney wheeled armoured personnel carrier (Ireland; Cold War)
- Tiuna high mobility multi-purpose wheeled vehicle (Venezuela; modern)
- Tipo 6634 wheeled armoured personnel carrier (Italy; Cold War)
- TK-3 Tankette (Poland; World War II)
- TKS Tankette (Poland; World War II)
- TM 125 wheeled armoured personnel carrier (Germany; Cold War)
- TM 170 wheeled armoured personnel carrier (Germany; Cold War)
- TM-800 main battle tank based on the T-55 (Romania; Cold War)
- TO-55 flamethrower tank based on the T-55 (Soviet Union; Cold War)
- TOMCAR wheeled (sometimes armoured) assault all-terrain vehicle (Israel, IDF)
- Tornado (popular name for the MOWAG Tornado)
- Tosan light tank (Iran; modern)
- TPK (designation for the ACMAT TPK)
- TR-77 also known as TR-580 main battle tank based on the T-55 (Romania; Cold War)
- TR-85 main battle tank based on the T-55 (Romania; Cold War)
- TR-125 main battle tank based on the T-72 (Romania; Cold War/modern)
- TR-580 main battle bank based on the T-55 (Romania; Cold War)
- Transportpaneer 1 Fuchs wheeled armoured personnel carrier (Germany; Cold War)
- Trekker (popular name for the Kurierwagen, also known as the Type 181, Type 182, Thing and Safari)
- Tsar Tank armoured attack vehicle (Russian Empire; World War I)
- Tunguska-M1 popular name for the 2S9M air-defence vehicle (Soviet Union; Cold War/modern)
- Tur Armored car (Poland; modern)
- Type 1 Chi-He medium tank (Japan; World War II)
- Type 1 Ho-Ha half-track armoured personnel carrier (APC) (Japan; World War II)
- Type 1 Ho-Ki tracked armored personnel carrier (Japan; World War II)
- Type 1 Ho-Ni I self-propelled gun (Japan; World War II)
- Type 2 Ho-I fire support gun tank (Japan; World War II)
- Type 2 Ka-Mi amphibious light tank (Japan; World War II)
- Type 2 Ke-To light tank (Japan; World War II)
- Type 3 Ka-Chi amphibious medium tank (Japan; World War II)
- Type 4 Ha-To self-propelled heavy mortar carrier (Japan; World War II)
- Type 4 Ho-Ro self-propelled 150 mm gun (Japan; World War II)
- Type 15 light tank (China; modern)
- Type 02 6×6 armoured car based on the WZ551 (also known as PTL02)(China; modern)
- Type 3 Chi-Nu medium tank (Japan; World War II)
- Type 30 main battle tank based on the Type 69 (China; Cold War)
- Type 54 self-propelled 122 mm artillery, variant of the Soviet 122 mm howitzer M1938 (M-30) (China; Cold War)
- Type 55 4×4 armoured personnel carrier based on the BTR-40 (China; Cold War)
- Type 56 6×6 armoured personnel carrier based on the BTR-152 (China; Cold War)
- Type 59 main battle tank based on the T-54 (China; Cold War)
- Type 60 tank destroyer (Japan; Cold War)
- Type 60 tractor based on the Type 63 (China; Cold War)
- Type 60 armoured vehicle series (Japan; Cold War)
- Type 61 main battle tank (Japan; Cold War)
- Type 62 light tank based on the Type 59 (China; Cold War)
- Type 63 SPAA self-propelled twin 37 mm gun (China; Cold War)
- Type 63 amphibious light tank based on the PT-76 (China; Cold War / modern)
- Type 63 armoured personnel carrier (China; Cold War)
- Type 64 light tank based on the M41 (Taiwan; Cold War)
- Type 67 bridging vehicle, variant of the Type 61 tank (Japan; Cold War)
- Type 69 main battle tank (China; Cold War)
- Type 70 self-propelled 122 mm mortar/gun based on the YW531 (also known as YW302 or WZ302) (China; Cold War)
- Type 70 self-propelled 19 tube multiple rocket launcher based on the YW531 (also known as YW303) (China; Cold War)
- Type 70 armoured recovery vehicle, variant of the Type 61 (Japan; Cold War)
- Type 72 main battle tank based on the T-54 (Iran; Cold War)
- Type 73 armoured fighting vehicle based on the Type 59 (China; Cold War)
- Type 73 armoured personnel carrier (Japan; Cold War)
- Type 74 main battle tank (Japan; Cold War)
- Type 77 amphibious armoured personnel carrier based on the Type 63 light tank (China; Cold War)
- Type 77 tractor (China; Cold War)
- Type 78 armoured recovery vehicle (Japan; Cold War)
- Type 79 main battle tank (China; Cold War)
- Type 79 armoured recovery vehicle based on the Type 62 (China; Cold War)
- Type 80 main battle tank (China; Cold War/modern)
- Type 80 SPAA self-propelled twin 57 mm gun - also WZ305(China; Cold War/modern)
- Type 81 6×6 self-propelled multiple rocket launcher based on the BM-21 on a SX2150 truck chassis (China; Cold War/modern)
- Type 82 Beetle 4×2 utility vehicle based on the Volkswagen Kübelwagen chassis (Germany; World War II)
- Type 82 self-propelled multiple rocket launcher based on the Type 60 (China; Cold War)
- Type 82 Bulldozer based on the Type 62 (China; Cold War/modern)
- Type 82 6×6 command and communications vehicle (Japan; modern)
- Type 83 self-propelled 152 mm howitzer (China; Cold War / modern)
- Type 84 bridging vehicle (China; Cold War/modern)
- Type 85 main battle tank (China; modern)
- Type 86 Kübelwagen 4×4 utility vehicle (Germany; World War II)
- Type 87 Kommandeurwagen 4×4 command vehicle (Germany; World War II)
- Type 86 infantry fighting vehicle based on the BMP-1 (also known as the WZ 501) (China; Cold War)
- Type 87 self-propelled twin 35 mm anti-aircraft guns based on the Type 74 chassis (Japan; Cold War/modern)
- Type 87 ARV 6×6 armoured reconnaissance vehicle (Japan; modern)
- Type 87 6×6 armoured car based on the WZ551 (China; modern)
- Type 88 K1 (alternate designation for the K1 88-Tank)
- Type 88 self-propelled 155 mm howitzer (also known as the PLZ45) (China; modern)
- Type 88 main battle tank (China; modern)
- Type 88 IFV infantry fighting vehicle (Japan; modern)
- Type 89 self-propelled 122 mm howitzer (also known as the PLZ45) (China; modern)
- Type 89 IFV infantry fighting vehicle (Japan; modern)
- Type 89 armoured personnel carrier (also known as the ZSD89 or YW534) (China; Cold War, modern)
- Type 90 main battle tank (Japan; modern)
- Type 90 main battle tank (China; modern)
- Type 90 armoured personnel carrier based on the YW534 (also known as ZBD90) (China; modern)
- Type 91 AVLB bridge laying vehicle based on the Type 90 chassis (Japan; modern)
- Type 92 SS 4×2 utility vehicle (also known as the Type 827 Kübelwagen) (Germany; World War II)
- Type 92 6×6 armoured vehicle (also known as WZ551 or ZSL92) (China; China; Cold War/modern)
- Type 93 armoured car (Japan; World War II)
- Type 93 6×6 armoured personnel carrier (also known as WZ523, ZSL93 or M1984) (China; Cold War/modern)
- Type 93 armoured recovery vehicle based on the YW534 (also known as ZJX93) (China; Cold War / modern)
- Type 94 armoured resupply vehicle based on the YW534 (also known as ZHB 94) (China; Cold War / modern)
- Type 95 Ha-Go light tank (Japan; World War II)
- Type 96 main battle tank (also known as the ZTZ96) (China; modern)
- Type 97 Chi-Ha medium tank (Japan; World War II)
- Type 97 amphibious infantry fighting vehicle (also known as ZBD97) (China; modern)
- Type 98 Ke-Ni light tank (Japan; World War II)
- Type 98 Ko-Hi half-track prime mover (Japan; World War II)
- Type 98 main battle tank (also known as ZTZ98) (China; modern)
- Type 99 main battle tank (also known as ZTZ99 or WZ123) (China; modern)
- Type 99 armoured command vehicle based on the YW534 (China; modern)
- Type 100 Te-Re fully tracked artillery observation vehicle (Japan; World War II)
- Type 128 Schwimmwagen 4×4 amphibious utility vehicle based on the Type 86 Kübelwagen (Germany; World War II)
- Type 166 Schwimmwagen 4×4 amphibious utility vehicle based on the Type 86 Kübelwagen (Germany; World War II)
- Type 181 Kurierwagen 4×2 utility vehicle (also known as the Thing, Safari and Trekker) (West Germany; Cold War)
- Type 182 Trekker 4×2 utility vehicle (also known as the Type 81, Kurierwagen, Thing and Safari) (West Germany; Cold War)
- Type 183 Iltis 4×4 utility vehicle (West Germany; Cold War)
- Type 653 armoured recovery vehicle (China; Cold War)
- Type 820 Kübelwagen 4×2 utility vehicle (Germany; World War II)
- Type 821 Kübelwagen 4×2 radio vehicle (Germany; World War II)
- Type 822 Kübelwagen 4×2 siren vehicle (Germany; World War II)
- Type 823 Kübelwagen 4×2 utility vehicle (Germany; World War II)
- Type 825 4×2 utility vehicle based on the Volkswagen Kübelwagen (Germany; World War II)
- Type 826 Kübelwagen 4×2 utility vehicle (Germany; World War II)
- Type 827 Kübelwagen 4×2 command vehicle (also known as the Type 92 SS) (Germany; World War II)
- Tank Technology Demonstrator (TTD) A prototype Main Battle Tank Developed by South Africa

== U ==
- UAZ-69 4×4 utility vehicle (also known as GAZ-69) (Soviet Union; Cold War)
- UAZ-469 4×4 utility vehicle (Soviet Union; Cold War)
- UAZ-3151 re-designation of the UAZ-469
- Ulan (popular name for the Austrian ASCOD infantry fighting vehicle) (Austria and Spain; modern)
- Ultra AP Concept replacement vehicle for humvee
- Ultra Light Vehicle Research Prototype Light tactical demonstrator vehicle (U.S. Army TARDEC)
- UR-416 4×4 armoured personnel carrier based on the Unimog 416 (also known as Acerro) (Germany; Cold War)
- Ural-4320 5-ton truck (Soviet Union; Cold War/modern)
- Urutu (popular name for the EE-11 Urutu)
- US-6 6×6 2.5 ton truck (also known as the G-630) (United States; World War II)

== V ==
- V3 Frederiksvaerk V3-armored vehicle was an armored truck reinforced by fighters from Frederiksvaerk built during the occupation. (Denmark; World War II)
- V3 Praga 6×6 truck (Czechoslovakia; Cold War)
- V41 light telephone maintenance vehicle (United States; Cold War)
- V-100 Commando 4×4 armoured vehicle (also known as the M706 and M1117 Guardian (United States; Cold War)
- V-150 Commando 4×4 armoured vehicle (United States; Cold War)
- V-200 Commando /Chaimite 4×4 armoured vehicle (Portugal, United States; Cold War)
- V-300 Commando /Chaimite 6×6 armoured vehicle (also known as the LAV-300 (Portugal, United States; Cold War)
- V-400 Chaimite wheeled armoured vehicle (Portugal; Cold War)
- V-500 Chaimite wheeled anti-tank vehicle with Swingfire/HOT missiles (Portugal; Cold War)
- V-600 Chaimite wheeled 81 mm mortar carrier (Portugal; Cold War)
- V-600 Commando wheeled fire support vehicle (also known as the LAV-600 (United States; Cold War)
- V-700 Chaimite wheeled ambulance (Portugal; Cold War)
- V-800 Chaimite wheeled command and communications vehicle (Portugal; Cold War)
- V-900 Chaimite wheeled recovery vehicle (Portugal; Cold War)
- V-1000 Chaimite wheeled anti-riot vehicle (Portugal; Cold War)
- VAB 4x4 armoured personnel carrier (France; Cold War)
- Valkiri 4×4 self-propelled multiple rocket launcher based on a SAMIL 20 truck (South Africa; Cold War/modern)
- VATT (light attack vehicle); wheeled anti-tank vehicle (Peru); 9M14-2T malyutka missile SACLOS system
- VEC-M1 6×6 armoured car (also known as Pegaso 3562) (Spain; Cold War/modern)
- VBC-90 6×6 armoured car (France; Cold War)
- VBL 4×4 armoured personnel carrier (France; modern)
- VBM Freccia 8×8 infantry fighting vehicle (Italy; modern)
- VCA self-propelled 155 mm gun based on the TH 301 (Germany; Cold War)
- VCC-1 Camillino armoured vehicle based on the M113 (Italy; Cold War)
- VCC-2 Camillino armoured vehicle based on the M113 (Italy; Cold War)
- VCC-80 infantry fighting vehicle (also known as the C13 Dardo) (Italy; modern)
- VCDA self-propelled air-defence vehicle based on the TH 301 (Germany; Cold War)
- VCDT artillery reconnaissance vehicle based on the TH 301 (Germany; Cold War)
- VCLC self-propelled multiple rocket launcher based on the TH 301 (Germany; Cold War)
- VCMun armoured artillery supply vehicle based on the TH 301 (Germany; Cold War)
- VCOAV armoured reconnaissance vehicle based on the ASCOD (Austria and Spain; modern)
- VCPC armoured command vehicle based on the TH 301 (Germany; Cold War)
- VCR wheeled armoured personnel carrier (France; modern)
- VCR 2 wheeled armoured personnel carrier (France; modern)
- VCREC armoured recovery vehicle based on the ASCOD (Austria and Spain; modern)
- VCRT armoured recovery vehicle based on the TH 301 (Germany; Cold War)
- VCTan medium tank (also known as TH 301 or TAM) (Germany; Cold War)
- VCTM self-propelled 120 mm mortar based on the TH 301 (Germany; Cold War)
- VCTP infantry fighting vehicle based on the TH 301 (Germany; Cold War)
- VCZ armoured engineering vehicle based on the ASCOD (Austria and Spain; modern)
- Vickers 6-Ton light tank (also known as the Mark E) (United Kingdom; pre–World War II)
- VIU-55 combat engineering vehicle based on the T-55 chassis (Israel; Cold War)
- VLA WPK 4 4×4 5 ton truck series (France; Cold War)
- VLA WPK 6 6×6 8 ton truck series (France; Cold War)
- VLA WPK 8 8×8 truck series (France; Cold War)
- VLRA TPK 4 4×4 2.5 ton truck series (France; Cold War)
- VLRA TPK 6 6×6 3.5 ton truck series (France; Cold War)
- VLRB 4×4 vehicle series (France; modern)
- VLTT designation for the P4 4×4 utility vehicle based on the Mercedes-Benz G-Class
- VM 90 4×4 off-road lightly armored military truck
- VP command vehicle based on the OT-90 chassis (Czechoslovakia; Cold War)
- VPV mobile crane on the BMP-1 chassis (Czechoslovakia; Cold War)
- VPX 5000 light armoured vehicle (France)
- VT-55 armoured recovery vehicle (Soviet Union; Cold War)
- VTT-323 armoured personnel carrier (China; Cold War)

== W ==
- Walker Bulldog (popular name for the M41 Walker Bulldog)
- Warrior (popular name for the FV510 Warrior)
- Water Buffalo (designation used for some variants of the American LVT series of amphibious vehicles)
- WC-62 6x6 1.5 ton truck (U.S.; World War II)
- WC-63 6x6 1.5 ton truck with winch, based on WC-62 (U.S.; World War II)
- Wer’wolf MKII 4×4 multi purpose MRAP(Namibia; modern)
- Wespe self-propelled 105 mm howitzer on a Panzer II chassis (Germany; World War II)
- Whippet Mk A medium tank (United Kingdom; World War I)
- Wiesel light tracked combat vehicle (Germany; Cold War)
- WJ94 4×4 anti-riot vehicle (China; modern)
- WR-40 Langusta 6×6 self-propelled multiple rocket launcher based on a Jelcz P662D.35 truck (Poland; modern)
- WS2050 6×6 truck based on the WS2400 (China; Cold War / modern)
- WS2300 6×6 15 ton truck based on the WS2400 (China; Cold War / modern)
- WS2400 8×8 transport/launcher of the DF-11 short range ballistic missile and A-100 multiple rockets based on the Scud's MAZ-543 TEL (China; Cold War / modern)
- WS2500 10×8 28 ton truck based on the WS2400 (China; Cold War / modern)
- WS2900 12×10 40 ton truck based on the WS2400 (China; Cold War / modern)
- WS51200 16×16 transport/launcher of the ballistic missile (China; modern)
- Wz.28 Armored Car (Poland; World War II)
- Wz.29 Ursus Armored Car (Poland; World War II)
- Wz.34 Armored Car (Poland; World War II)
- WZ91 4×4 self-propelled HJ-8 anti-tank missile carrier (China; modern)
- WZ120 main battle tank based on the T-54 (China; Cold War)
- WZ123 main battle tank (also known as Type 99 or ZTZ99) (China; modern)
- WZ302 self-propelled 122 mm mortar/gun based on the YW531 (also known as YW302 or Type 70) (China; Cold War)
- WZ501 infantry fighting vehicle based on the BMP-1 (also known as the Type 86) (China; Cold War)
- WZ503 armoured personnel carrier based on the BMP-1 (China; Cold War)
- WZ504 self-propelled anti-tank vehicle with HJ-73 based on the BMP-1 (China; Cold War)
- WZ505 infantry fighting vehicle based on the BMP-1 (also known as the Type 86) (China; Cold War)
- WZ506 airborne infantry fighting vehicle (also known as ZLC2000) (China; modern)
- WZ506 command vehicle based on the BMP-1 (China; Cold War)
- WZ523 6×6 armoured personnel carrier (also known as ZSL93, Type 93 or M1984) (China; China; Cold War/modern)
- WZ550 4×4 self-propelled HJ-9 anti-tank missile carrier (China; modern)
- WZ551 6×6 armoured vehicle (also known as the Type 92 or ZSL92) (China; Cold War/modern)
- WZ554 6×6 self-propelled twin 23 mm anti-aircraft vehicle based on the WZ551 (China; modern)
- WZ653 / WZ 653A armoured recovery vehicle based on WZ121 Type 69 Main Battle Tank (China; modern)
- WZ701 armoured command carrier (China; Cold War)
- WZ731 armoured battlefield reconnaissance vehicle based on the YW534 (also known as ZZC02) (China; modern)
- WZ750 armoured ambulance (China; Cold War)
- WZ751 armoured ambulance (China; Cold War)
- WZ752 armoured ambulance based on the YW534 (China; modern)
- WZ901 6×6 anti-riot and patrol vehicle based on the WZ551 (China; modern)
- WZT-1 armoured recovery vehicle based on the BTS-2 (Poland; Cold War)
- WZT-2 armoured recovery vehicle based on the T-55 (Poland; Cold War)
- WZT-3 armoured recovery vehicle based on the T-72 (Poland; Cold War/modern)
- WZT-3M armoured recovery vehicle based on the PT-91 (Poland; Cold War/modern)

== X ==
- X1A light tank based on the Stuart tank (Brazil; Cold War)
- XA-180 Pangu wheeled armoured personnel carrier (Finland; modern)
- XC2030 6×6 8 ton truck based on the Mercedes-Benz 2060 (China; Cold War / modern)
- XJ92 6×6 armoured recovery vehicle based on the WZ551 (China; modern)

== Y ==
- YP-408 wheeled armoured personnel carrier (Netherlands; Cold War)
- YPR-765 infantry fighting vehicle based on the AIFV (itself developed from the M113) (United States; Cold War/modern)
- YPR-806 armoured recovery vehicle based on the AIFV (itself developed from the M113) (United States; Cold War/modern)
- YW302 self-propelled 122 mm mortar based on the YW531 (also known as Type 70) (China; Cold War)
- YW303 self-propelled 19 tube multiple rocket launcher based on the YW531 (also known as Type 70) (China; Cold War)
- YW304 self-propelled 82 mm mortar based on the YW531 (China; Cold War)
- YW307 infantry fighting vehicle (China; Cold War)
- YW309 infantry fighting vehicle (China; Cold War)
- YW381 self-propelled 120 mm mortar based on the YW531 (China; Cold War)
- YW531 armoured personnel carrier (also known as the Type 63) (China; Cold War)
- YW534 armoured personnel carrier (also known as the ZSD89 or Type 89) (China; Cold War, modern)
- YW701 command vehicle based on the YW531 (China; Cold War)
- YW721 communications vehicle based on the YW531 (China; Cold War)
- YW750 ambulance based on the YW531 (China; Cold War)

== See also ==
- List of aircraft
- List of ships
- List of weapons
