= LOV =

LOV may refer to:

- LOV-1, a Croatian armoured personnel carrier
- Light-Oxygen-Voltage-sensing domain, in proteins
- Monclova International Airport IATA code
- "LOV", a song by Felix Jaehn, featuring Sondr and Andrew Jackson, from I (Felix Jaehn album)
