= ACEC Cobra =

- Type: APC (AFV)
- Place of origin: Belgium

Production history
- Manufacturer: ACEC SA
- Variants: Numerous, see text

Specifications
- Mass: 8,500 kg (9,500 kg)
- Length: 4.52 m (6.86 m)
- Width: 2.75 m
- Height: 2.32 m (2.25 m)
- Crew: 2 + 10 passengers (3)
- Armor: 7.62mm NATO ball all angles at point-blank range, 7.62mm AP front armour, 105mm HE shrapnel all round
- Main armament: see text
- Secondary armament: see text
- Engine: Cummins VT-190 super-charged, water cooled diesel engine 190 hp at 3,300 rpm
- Power/weight: 22.35 hp/tonne (20 hp/tonne)
- Transmission: ACEC electrical
- Suspension: Helicoidal (helical) springs with shock absorbers on first and last road wheel stations
- Ground clearance: 0.42 m (0.4 m)
- Fuel capacity: 309 litres
- Operational range: 600 km
- Maximum speed: 75 km/h (land) 10 km/h (water)

The ACEC Cobra is a tracked armored personnel carrier with amphibious capabilities, similar in concept to the BTR-50. It was developed by Ateliers de Constructions Electriques de Charleroi (ACEC) along with the Belgian Army. The Cobra was the fifth vehicle prototype of an experimental project to create a vehicle with an electric transmission. The electric transmissions made the vehicle lighter and have more room than previous vehicles. The vehicle was completed in October 1985, but never made it into active service because the Cold War ended in 1989/1990. When the Cobra went through performance training in Detroit, the test drivers stated that the electric transmission gave the Cobra equal, if not better, performance and maneuverability than vehicles with mechanical transmissions. The vehicle provided its passengers with protections from small arms fire, small armour piercing projectiles, and shell splinters.

== Variants ==
Of the Cobra, several versions have been developed, using identical automotive components:

- Cobra APC: has a crew of two and carries up to 10 fully equipped infantrymen. Armed with a roof-mounted 12.7mm M2HB machine gun. Optionally, the .50cal machine gun could be replaced by cannons up to 90mm. Some versions had a bow-mounted 7.62mm machine gun MAG. This version could also be used as the basis for a mortar carrier.
- Cobra AFV: with a crew of three and fitted with a turret for cannons up to 90mm. One prototype was equipped with an AK 90 E two-man electrical turret, armed with Cockerill's KEnerga 90/46 gun and fitted with the OIP LRS-5 fire control system with ballistic computer, day/night sight and a laser rangefinder. Another version had the Cockerill C-25 two-man turret with Oerlikon KBB 25mm gun and 7.62mm coax machine gun.

It was also possible to fit the MILAN MBT turret.

- Cobra LAU97: with a FZ 70 mm multiple locket launcher, tested in 1985.
- Cobra 120:fitted with a Thomson-Brandt 120 mm mortar firing to the rear
