= M8 tractor =

M8 high-speed tractor
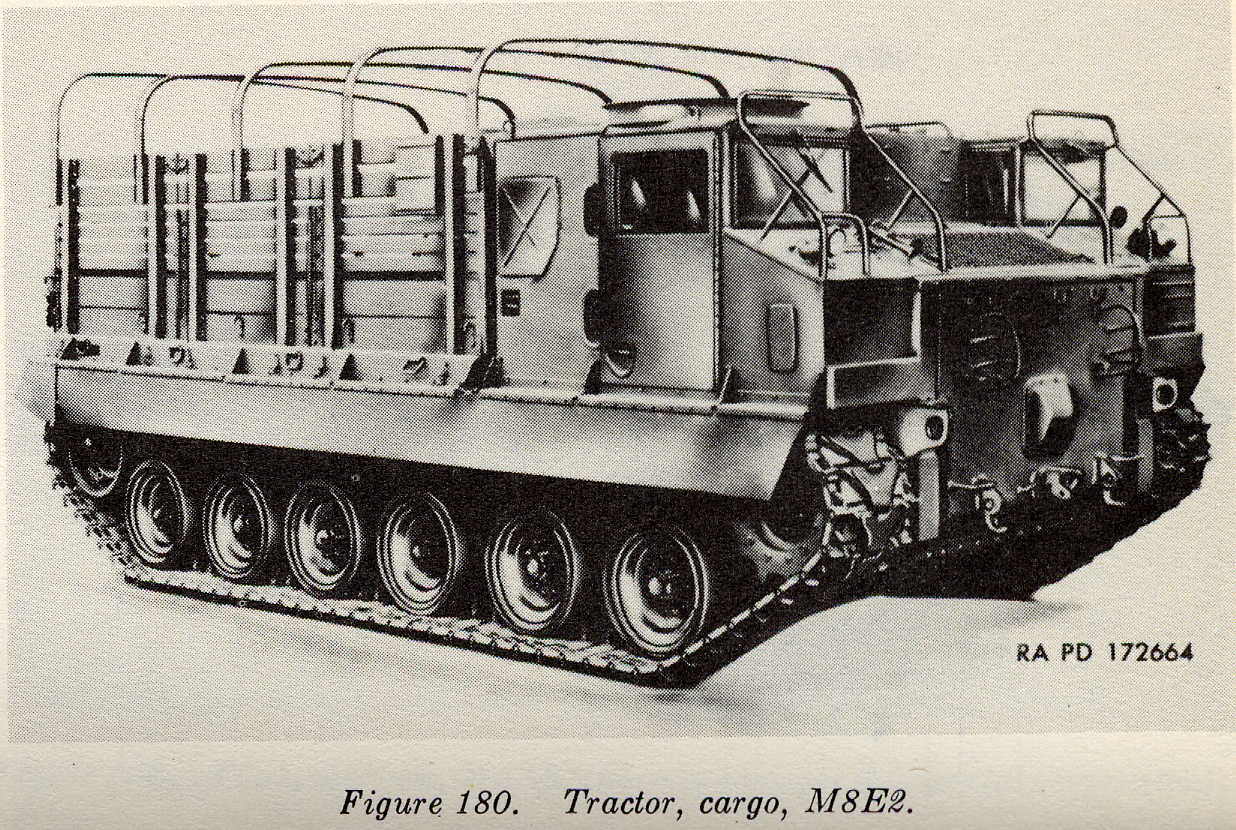
- M8E2 high-speed tractor 1954
- Type: Artillery tractor
- Place of origin: United States

Service history
- Used by: US Army, JGSDF

Production history
- Manufacturer: Allis-Chalmers
- Produced: 1950 to 1955

Specifications
- Mass: 54,000 lb (24,000 kg)
- Length: 22 ft (6.731 m)
- Width: 10 ft 11 in (3.327 m)
- Height: 10 ft (3.048 m)
- Crew: 1 + 1
- Armor: none
- Main armament: 1 x 0.5 inch (12.7 mm) anti-aircraft machine gun
- Engine: Continental AOS-895-3 six-cylinder air-cooled petrol engine 863 hp (644 kW)
- Power/weight: 34.60 hp/tonnes
- Operational range: 180 miles (290 km)
- Maximum speed: 40 mph (64 km/h)

The M8 high-speed tractor was an artillery tractor used by the US Army and Marine Corps from 1950.

== Construction ==
The M8 is a full-track tractor based on the chassis of the M41 Walker Bulldog light tank. It was used to tow cargo trailers and artillery such as the Skysweeper 75 mm anti-aircraft gun and the M59 Long Tom gun. The basic M8 variant could be quickly adapted for carrying projectiles and charges. Unusually for a tractor, the M8's engine was located at the front of the cab. Some M8s were equipped with a hydraulic M5 dozer blade.

== History ==
The M8 was developed following the failure of the T33 cargo-carrier, which was based on the M24 Chaffee light tank chassis. The new, standardized M8 was produced between 1950 and 1955.

== See also ==
- G-numbers (G-252)
- M-numbers
- M548
