= Type 60 tracked tractor =

Type 60 is a tracked tractor developed in the 1960s to tow missile launchers and mobile radar, based on the Type 63. Originally developed by Luoyang Tractor Manufactory in 1960.

== Variants ==
- Type 60-I: five seater improved variant that entered service in 1976
- R914B: mobile radar tractor derived from the Type 60
- R421: mobile radar tractor derived from the Type 60-I
- D421: cable carrier
- Type 82: 4X273 mm multiple rocket launcher chassis
