= RN-94 =

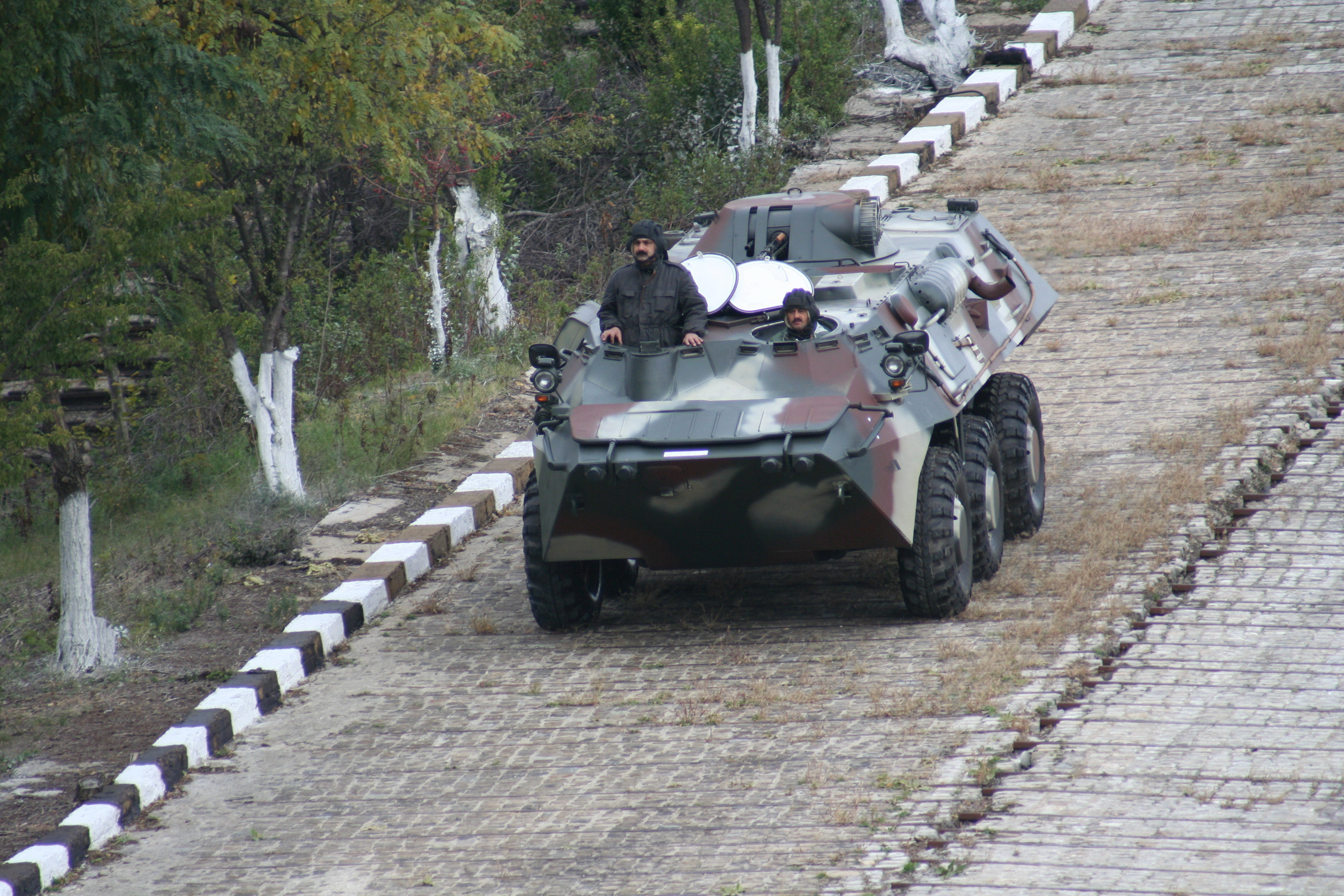
- RN-94 during a demonstration at Mihai Bravu firing range
- Type: Armoured personnel carrier
- Place of origin: Romania; Turkey

Service history
- In service: 1995–present
- Used by: Bangladesh Army

Production history
- Designed: 1994
- Manufacturer: Nurol Makina and S N Romarm SA Filiala SC Moreni of Bucharest
- Produced: 1995

Specifications
- Mass: 12,880 kg
- Length: 6.7 m
- Width: 2.8 m
- Height: 2.3 m
- Crew: 2 + 11 soldiers
- Armor: resistant to 7.62 mm AP
- Main armament: 25 mm autocannon or 14,5 mm MG or 12,7 mm MG
- Secondary armament: 7,62 mm or SPIKE missile
- Engine: Cummins, 4 stroke, turbo diesel 275 hp at 2300 rpm
- Power/weight: 19,5 hp/t
- Transmission: 6 x 6
- Ground clearance: 450 mm
- Operational range: 700 km
- Maximum speed: 95 kilometres per hour (59 mph) (road); 10 kilometres per hour (6.2 mph) (water)

The RN-94 (6 × 6) armoured personnel carrier was originally developed by Nurol Machinery and Industry Co Inc (Nurol Makina) based in Ankara and S N Romarm SA Filiala S C Moreni of Bucharest, Romania. The hull of the RN-94 is all-welded steel armour structure which provides maximum protection against 7.62 mm armour-piercing ammunition and shell splinters all round.

== Operators ==
- Bangladesh - Bangladesh Army operates the armoured ambulance variant in limited number. Estimated 9.
- Romania - prototype
- Turkey - 5
