= LOV-1 =

BVP LOV-1
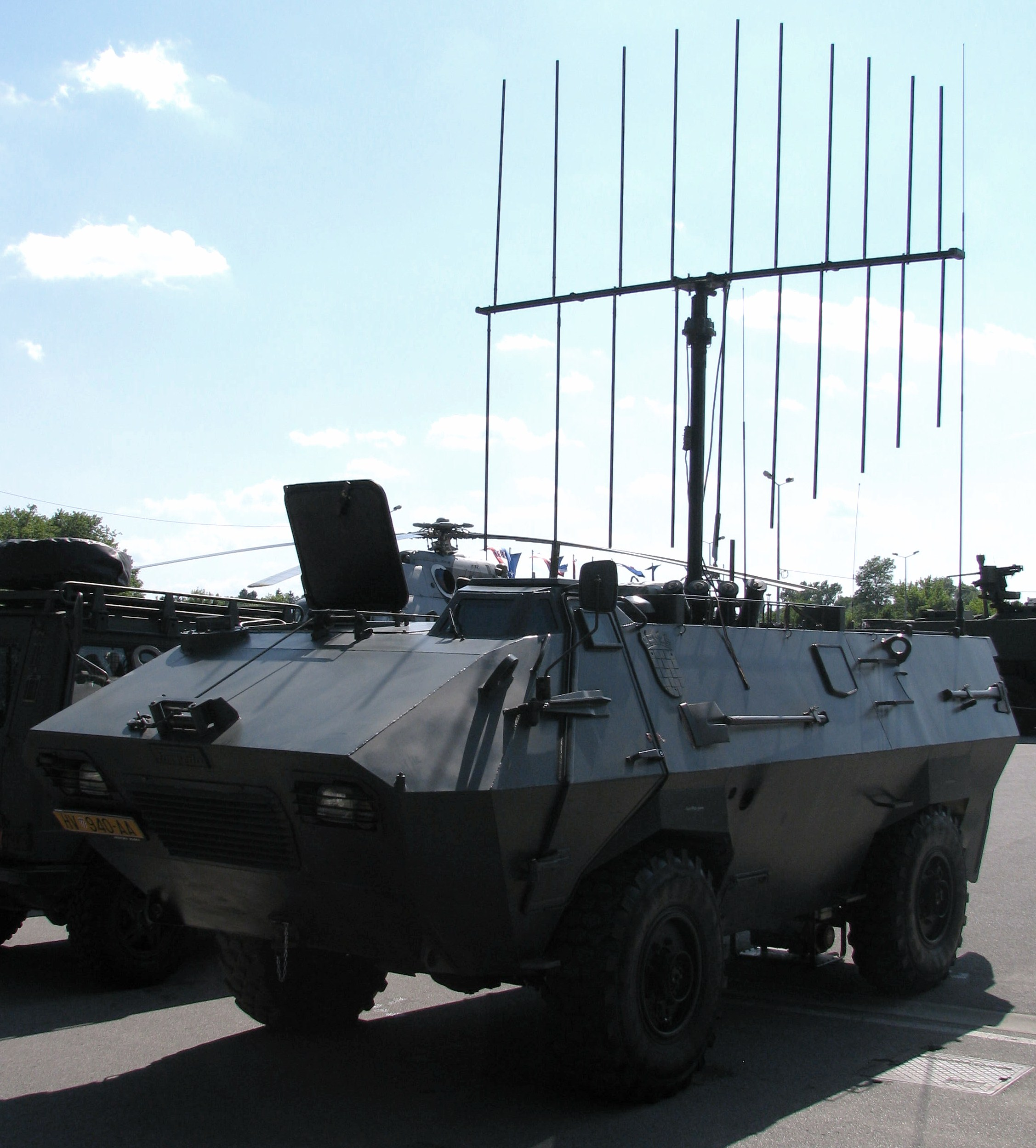
- Type: Armoured personnel carrier
- Place of origin: Croatia

Production history
- Manufacturer: Torpedo

Specifications
- Mass: 8,800 kilograms (8.7 long tons)
- Length: 5.89 metres (19 ft 4 in)
- Width: 2.36 metres (7 ft 9 in)
- Height: 2.10 metres (6 ft 11 in)
- Crew: 2 + 8
- Armor: 7 - 8 mm steel
- Main armament: 12.7 mm M2 Browning machine gun 1000 rounds
- Engine: Torpedo BT6L 912S (diesel); 97 kW (132 hp)
- Power/weight: 15.0 hp/tonne
- Suspension: torsion bar
- Operational range: 500 kilometres (310 mi)
- Maximum speed: 85 kilometres per hour (53 mph) on land

The LOV-1 (Croatian: Lako Oklopno Vozilo or Light Armoured Vehicle) is a wheeled non-amphibious armoured personnel carrier from Croatia.

== History ==
During the Croatian War of Independence the Croatian army lacked a proper light armoured personnel carrier. The Croatian Ministry of Defense asked local firms to provide a solution for a light, fast and reliable armoured personnel carrier which could be produced quickly and in large quantities, without the need to import parts from abroad due to a UN arms embargo imposed on Croatia at the time.

Torpedo, a local firm from Rijeka, developed a basic armoured personnel carrier based on the TK-130 T-7 4x4 military truck, itself a licensed-produced and uprated TAM 110 from Slovenian TAM. The Army ordered 50 LOV-1 vehicles in late 1993, with the initial batch being delivered in 1994 and presented to the public on a military parade in May 1995 in Zagreb.

All LOV-1s were replaced by Patria AMV and MRAP vehicles.

== Versions ==
- LOV-OP - basic variant armed with M2 Browning machine gun for transporting up to eight infantrymen
- LOV-Z - unarmed command variant with additional radio equipment, air-conditioning and sound insulation
- LOV-IZV - reconnaissance and scout vehicle armed with a 20mm RT-20 heavy sniper rifle and a light 8-round 60mm MLRS called Obad (Horse-fly)
- LOV-ABK - NBC warfare vehicle
- LOV-RAK 24/128 mm - equipped with a 24-tube 128mm MLRS, only 2 prototypes built
- LOV-UP1 - artillery observation vehicle for directing artillery fire and spotting enemy artillery positions equipped with GPS, thermal imaging, laser range finder and ground artillery radar
- LOV-UP2 - artillery command vehicle
- LOV-ED - electronic warfare vehicle
- LOV T2 - improved variant that entered service in 1997, only a few built

== Combat history ==
The LOV-1 saw action in the Croatian War of Independence, particularly in Operations Flash and Storm.
