= Armoured warfare =

Use of armoured fighting vehicles in war

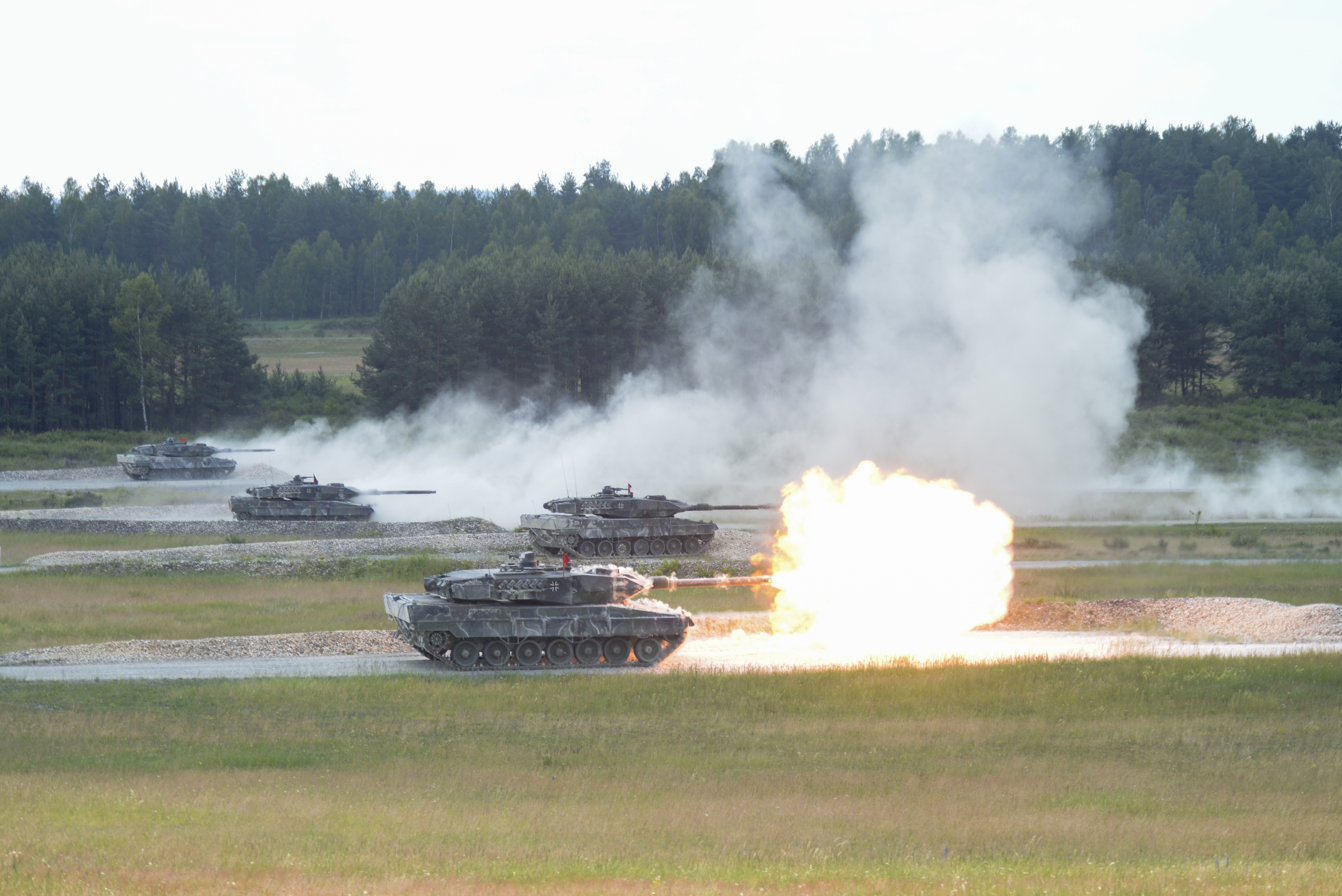
A shooting contest between Leopard 2A6 tanks during the Strong Europe Tank Challenge in Grafenwöhr, Germany, in 2018

Armoured warfare is the use of armoured fighting vehicles in modern warfare. It is a major component of modern methods of war. The premise of armoured warfare rests on the ability of troops to penetrate conventional defensive lines through use of manoeuvre by armoured units.

Much of the application of armoured warfare depends on the use of tanks and related vehicles used by other supporting arms such as infantry fighting vehicles, self-propelled artillery, and other combat vehicles, as well as mounted combat engineers and other support units. The doctrine of armoured warfare was developed to break the static nature of World War I trench warfare on the Western Front, and return to the 19th century school of thought that advocated manoeuvre and decisive battle outcomes in military strategy.

== World War I ==
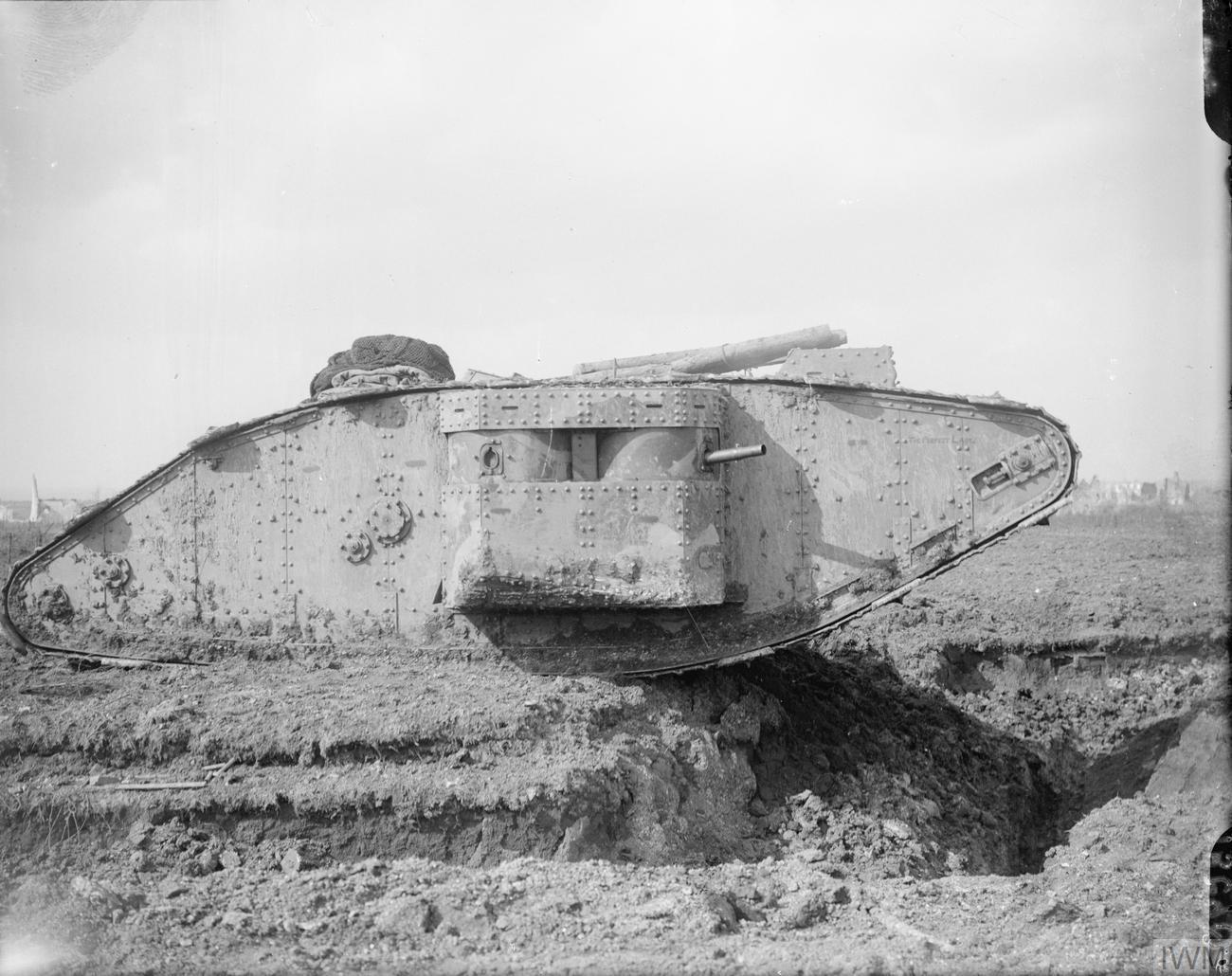
A British heavy tank during World War I

Modern armoured warfare began during the First World War of 1914–1918. Strategists wanted to break the tactical, operational and strategic stalemates forced on commanders on the Western Front by the effectiveness of entrenched defensive infantry armed with machine guns – known as trench warfare. Under these conditions, attacks usually advanced very slowly and incurred massive casualties. The developers of tanks aimed to return manoeuvre to warfare, and found a practical way to do so: providing caterpillar traction to machine guns allowing them to overcome trenches, while at the same time offering them armour protection against small arms as they were moving.

Britain and France first developed tanks in 1915 as a way of navigating the barbed wire and other obstacles of no-man's land while remaining protected from machine-gun fire. British Mark I tanks first went into action at the Somme on 15 September 1916, but did not manage to break the deadlock of trench warfare. The first French employment of tanks, on 16 April 1917, using the Schneider CA, also failed to live up to expectations. In the Battle of Cambrai (November to December 1917) British tanks were more successful, and broke a German trenchline system, the Hindenburg Line.

Despite the generally unpromising beginnings, the military and political leadership in both Britain and France during 1917 backed large investment into armoured-vehicle production. This led to a sharp increase in the number of available tanks for 1918. The German Empire, on the contrary, produced only a few tanks, late in the war. Twenty German A7V tanks were produced during the entire conflict, compared to over 4,400 French and over 2,500 British tanks of various kinds. Nonetheless, World War I saw the first tank-versus-tank battle, during the Second Battle of Villers-Bretonneux in April 1918, when a group of three German A7V tanks engaged a group of three British Mark IV tanks which they met accidentally.

After the final German spring offensives of 21 March to 18 July 1918, the Entente deployed tanks en masse at the Battle of Soissons (18 to 22 July 1918) and Battle of Amiens (August 1918), which ended the stalemate imposed by trench warfare on the Western Front, and thus effectively ended the war.

Tactically, deployment plans for armour during the war typically placed a strong emphasis on direct support for infantry. The tank's main tasks were seen as crushing barbed-wire and destroying machine-gun nests, facilitating the advance of foot soldiers. Theoretical debate largely focused on the question of whether to use a "swarm" of light tanks for this, or a limited number of potent heavy vehicles. Though in the Battle of Cambrai a large concentration of British heavy tanks effected a breakthrough, it was not exploited by armour. The manoeuvrability of the tank should at least in theory regain armies the ability to flank enemy lines. In practice, tank warfare during most of World War I was hampered by the technical immaturity of the new weapon system, limiting speed, operational range, and reliability, and a lack of effective armoured tactics.

Strategic use of tanks developed only slowly during and immediately after World War I, partly due to these technical limits but also due to the prestige role traditionally accorded to horse-mounted cavalry. An exception, on paper, was the Plan 1919 of the British Army's Colonel J. F. C. Fuller, who envisaged using the expected vast increase in armour production during 1919 to execute deep strategic penetrations by mechanised forces consisting of tanks and infantry carried by trucks, supported by aeroplanes, to paralyse the enemy command-structure.

Following the First World War, the technical and doctrinal aspects of armoured warfare became more sophisticated and diverged into multiple schools of doctrinal thought.

== Interwar period ==
=== 1920s ===
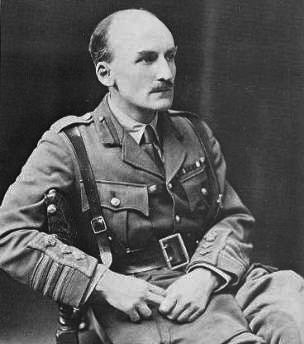
J. F. C. Fuller

During the 1920s, a very limited number of tanks were produced. There were however, important theoretical and technical developments. Various British and French commanders who had contributed to the origin of the tank, such as Jean Baptiste Eugène Estienne, B. H. Liddell Hart and J. F. C. Fuller, theorised about a possible future use of independent armoured forces, containing a large concentration of tanks, to execute deep strategic penetrations. Especially Liddell Hart wrote many books about the subject, partly propagating Fuller's theories. Such doctrines were faced with the reality that during the 1920s the armoured vehicles, as early road transport in general, were extremely unreliable, and could not be used in sustained operations. Mainstream thought on the subject was more conservative and tried to integrate armoured vehicles into the existing infantry and cavalry organisation and tactics.

Technical development initially focused on the improvement of the suspension system, transmission and engine, to create vehicles that were faster, more reliable and had a better range than their WW I predecessors. To save weight, such designs had thin armour plating and this inspired fitting small-calibre high-velocity guns in turrets, giving tanks a good antitank capacity. Both France and Britain eventually built specialised infantry tanks, more heavily armoured to provide infantry support, and cavalry tanks that were faster and could exploit a breakthrough, seeking to bring about defeat of the enemy by severing his lines of communication and supply, as cavalry had done during the previous century.

The British were the first to create a larger fully mechanised unit when the War Office sanctioned the creation of the Experimental Mechanized Force, which was formed on 1 May 1927, under infantry Colonel R. J. Collins, after Fuller (was) refused the function. Its sub-units were entirely mobile and consisted of reconnaissance tankettes and armoured cars, a battalion of forty-eight Vickers Medium Mark I tanks, a motorised machine-gun battalion, a mechanised artillery regiment, which had one battery of fully tracked self-propelled Birch guns capable of acting as conventional or anti-aircraft artillery, and a motorised company of field engineers. The unit carried out operations on Salisbury Plain and was observed by the other major nations, the United States, Germany, and the Soviet Union. Although its performance was recognised, it was disbanded in 1928.

In 2022, Kendrick Kuo, assistant professor at the U.S. Naval War College, argued that the British army, under budget and over-stretched during the interwar period, pursued innovation recklessly by betting on the combat effectiveness of armoured units operating with little infantry or artillery support. Doing so led to its initial setbacks in North Africa during the Second World War.

All major European states (with the exception of Germany that was forbidden to possess armoured vehicles under the Treaty of Versailles), the US, and Japan, would create their own experimental mechanised forces during the late 1920s, many using either French or British vehicle designs or even directly purchased vehicles, but largely borrowing from both to develop their own doctrines.

=== 1930s ===
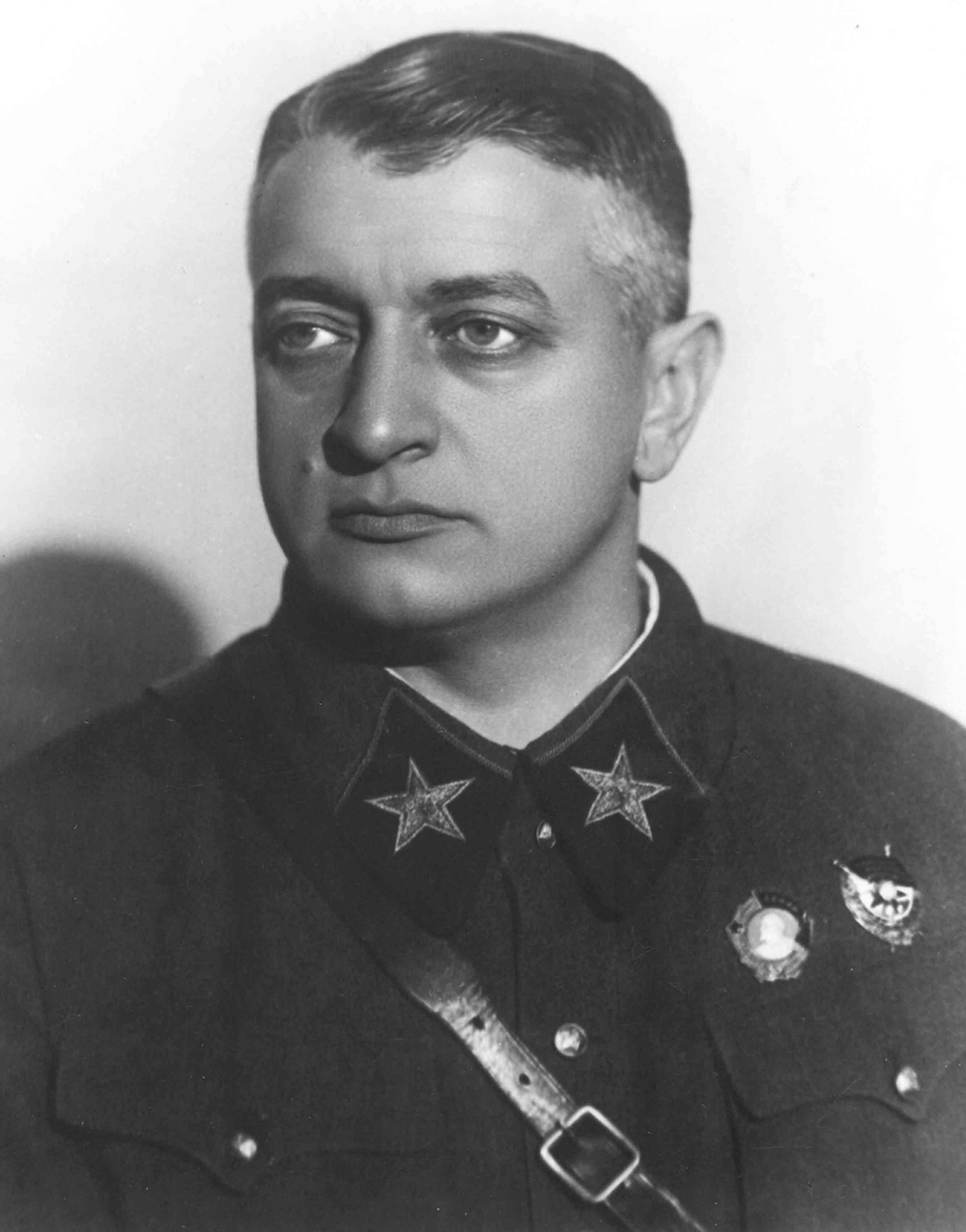
Mikhail Tukhachevsky

During the 1930s, political tensions between the world powers quickly increased. The Soviet Union and France began to re-arm in the early thirties. In the Soviet Union, the mechanisation of the armed forces was part of a massive general industrialisation programme (the successive Five-year Plans), and the country soon had more tanks than the rest of the world combined, thousands of them being produced per year.Before the rise to power of the Nazi Party in Germany (1933), the Weimar Republic and the Soviet Union co-operated in military developments: German Reichswehr officers were sent to observe and participate in development of armoured doctrine in the USSR, and Red Army and German experts collaborated in developing the use of tanks based on second-generation vehicles with turreted main weapons, and in experimenting to design different chassis-configurations and drive-trains. One important acquisition for the Red Army turned out to be the purchase of a T3 chassis using the Christie suspension, from US designer John Walter Christie — this served as the basis of the Soviet BT series of fast tanks in service from 1932 to 1945. The Red Army's tactics were influenced by the theoretical works of Marshal Mikhail Tukhachevsky, who advocated "large scale tank warfare" as part of the deep-battle doctrine.

In France (the second-largest tank-producing country) mechanisation was motivated by a need to compensate for severe manpower shortages due to a collapsed birth rate during World War I. This led to the development of a vast range of specialised armoured vehicles, not just tanks but also armoured cars, self-propelled guns, mechanised artillery, armoured tractors, armoured supply-vehicles, armoured artillery-observation vehicles, armoured command-vehicles, half-tracks, and fully tracked armoured personnel carriers. As the mechanisation progressed, slowly the French armour doctrine began to reflect the increased capacity, evolving from direct infantry support, to independent breakthrough and eventually envelopment with the Infantry arm, and to deep strategic exploitation with the Cavalry arm. Despite the increase in tank numbers, in all countries financial constraints prohibited a full mechanisation of the entire armed ground-forces. Necessarily, most of the divisions still consisted of infantry that was not even motorised. As a result, tanks tended to be allotted to special armoured units, where the limited and expensive expert maintenance and training capacity could be concentrated. Only the Soviet Union had enough tanks to equip an organic tank battalion in each infantry division. Nevertheless, France was the first to create large armoured units: in 1934 two Mechanised Corps were formed, each with 430 tanks. In July 1935, the French 4th Cavalry Division was transformed into the 1e Division Légère Mécanique, the first French armoured division of the Cavalry. In Germany, after the Nazi Regime started open rearmament in March 1935, on 15 October 1935 three Panzerdivisionen were formed. Though some tank brigades were part of the cavalry or infantry arm, most German tanks were concentrated into a special branch, from 1936 called the Panzerwaffe. The precise interpretation of this phenomenon has proven controversial among military historians. Traditionally, it has been seen as part of a "Blitzkrieg strategy" of swift world conquest by means of armoured forces. Later it has been argued (by Karl-Heinz Frieser among others) that the German army in the 1930s did not even possess an explicit Blitzkrieg tactical doctrine, let alone strategy — a deficiency reflected in the relatively unimpressive rate of tank production and development. During the 1930s the United Kingdom gave priority to the Royal Air Force and the Royal Navy. The British Army began the conversion of its cavalry from horses to tanks, and all but a few regiments were fully converted by 1939. The British 1st Armoured Division formed, as the "Mobile Division", in November 1937.

Before the Second World War actual use of armoured fighting-vehicles was limited. Both sides used tanks (Italian, German and Soviet) during the Spanish Civil War of 1936 to 1939, but these vehicles proved vulnerable to antitank guns due to their thin armour. Traditionalist elements within the Red Army used this deficiency to diminish the influence of proponents of mechanisation. Tukhachevsky himself was executed in 1937 in the course of the Great Purge. Nevertheless, during the Soviet-Japanese Border Wars of 1938 and 1939, Soviet forces tested modern armoured-warfare tactics. Georgy Zhukov combined mass tank manoeuvres with artillery and air attacks to defeat the Japanese Imperial Army at the Battles of Khalkhin Gol (May to September 1939) at Nomonhan in Mongolia. Partly as a result of the experiences in Spain, the Soviet Union began the development of a new generation of medium and heavy tanks, sporting much stronger armour and armament.

== World War II ==
=== Poland ===
In their Invasion of Poland during September 1939, German forces applied a narrow cooperation between large armoured units – of the Panzerwaffe and the Cavalry – and "active" infantry divisions to break the Polish defensive lines and pursue the defeated enemy forces. The more limited and dispersed Polish armoured units were quickly destroyed. The Red Army, invading the east of Poland, also deployed armoured divisions. At the time, the swift collapse of the Polish army was seen as the result of an armoured Blitzkrieg. However, later it has been argued that the campaign was largely an instance of the classical nineteenth century German concept of the "Annihilation Battle", in which the role of deep strategic armoured penetrations was limited.

=== France ===
In the wake of the Polish campaign, during the Phoney War French, British and German tank production sharply increased, with both western allies out-producing Germany. However, the Anglo-French coalition proved unable to match the Germans in the number of armoured divisions, as it was impossible to quickly raise such large units. Though the French possessed a superior number of tanks, often better armoured and armed, half of these were allotted at army-level to independent Bataillons de Chars de Combat ("battle tank battalions") for infantry support. In early 1940, the German command had concluded that it could not win a war of attrition and embarked on a high-risk strategy. They approved the Manstein Plan, envisaging an advance through the Ardennes by the main mass of German infantry divisions, spearheaded by seven armoured divisions, while the main mobile French reserve consisting of three Cavalry armoured divisions (Divisions Légères Mécaniques or Mechanised Light Divisions) – the only armoured units organised on the lines of the German armoured divisions – would be lured into the Low Countries by a feint attack with a lesser force, including three armoured divisions. In May 1940, during the Battle of France, the German feint resulted in a number of undecided armour engagements, among them the Battle of Hannut, the largest tank battle fought until that date. At the same time, German motorised infantry west of the Ardennes forced the crossings over the river Meuse, assisted by massive carpet bombing of the crossing points. In the original plan, the armoured divisions were again supposed to closely cooperate with the infantry divisions. In reality, armour commanders like Erwin Rommel and Heinz Guderian immediately broke out of the bridgeheads, initiating a drive towards the English Channel, which was reached within a week. The French reserve of four Infantry armoured divisions, the Divisions cuirassées, lacked sufficient strategic mobility to prevent this. The strategic envelopment surrounded the Belgian army, the British Expeditionary Force and the best French troops. It led to the Evacuation of Dunkirk and the ultimate fall of France in operation Fall Rot.

The spectacular and unexpected success not only caused a sudden change in the global geostrategic situation, gaining Germany a position of hegemony on the European continent, but also seemed to vindicate the theories of Fuller and Liddell-Hart. Confronted with the undeniable potential of armoured manoeuvre warfare, from the summer of 1940 onwards the armed forces of all surviving major powers adapted their tactical doctrine, unit organisation, strategic planning and tank production plans. According to Frieser, this was even true for Germany itself, that only now officially adopted Blitzkrieg tactics.

=== North African theatre ===
In the deserts of North Africa, the British developed the alternative approach of combining the armoured, infantry and artillery together to form a 'balanced, combined arms team'. The 10th Italian Army of Maresciallo (Marshal) Rodolfo Graziani, being ill-armed and inadequately led, soon gave way to this approach by the Commonwealth troops of the British Western Desert Force.

The arrival of the German Afrika Korps under command of General der Panzertruppe Erwin Rommel highlighted the weaknesses of the British approach: the small number of infantry and artillery in each armoured division was sufficient when attacking the immobile and uncoordinated Italian troops, but against the highly mobile, well-coordinated German units, the undermanned Commonwealth formations were proving inadequate.

Between 1941 and 1942, the Allies struggled in armoured battles in the North African desert due to improper tactics; in particular, running armoured formations into opposing anti-tank positions; however, they achieved some notable successes at Crusader, 1st Alamein and under Montgomery finally achieved decisive victories, in particular at the Second Battle of El Alamein.

In 2022, Kendrick Kuo, assistant professor at the U.S. Naval War College, wrote that due to factors emanating from the interwar period, the British army in North Africa initially operated their armoured units with little infantry or artillery support. Meanwhile, the Germans had integrated their armour with mechanised infantry and artillery. Only after undoing their misplaced emphasis on armour were the British able to restore their combat effectiveness.

=== Soviet Union ===
==== Pre-war ====
Much of the Red Army development in tank use was based on the theoretical work carried out by such officers as Tukhachevsky and Triandafillov in the mid to late 1930s. This was as part of the two-directioned concepts, one being infantry-centred "broad front" and the other being a "shock army".

While the infantry based part of the doctrine demanded "powerful tanks" (heavy tanks armed with infantry guns and machineguns) and "tankettes" (light, often amphibious tanks with machineguns), the shock army demanded "manoeuvre tanks" (fast tanks with medium guns) used in conjunction with motorised forces and "mechanised cavalry" that would operate in depth as "strategic cavalry" combined with nascent airborne troops. These ideas culminated in the "PU-36" or the 1936 Field Service Regulations.

==== Wartime ====
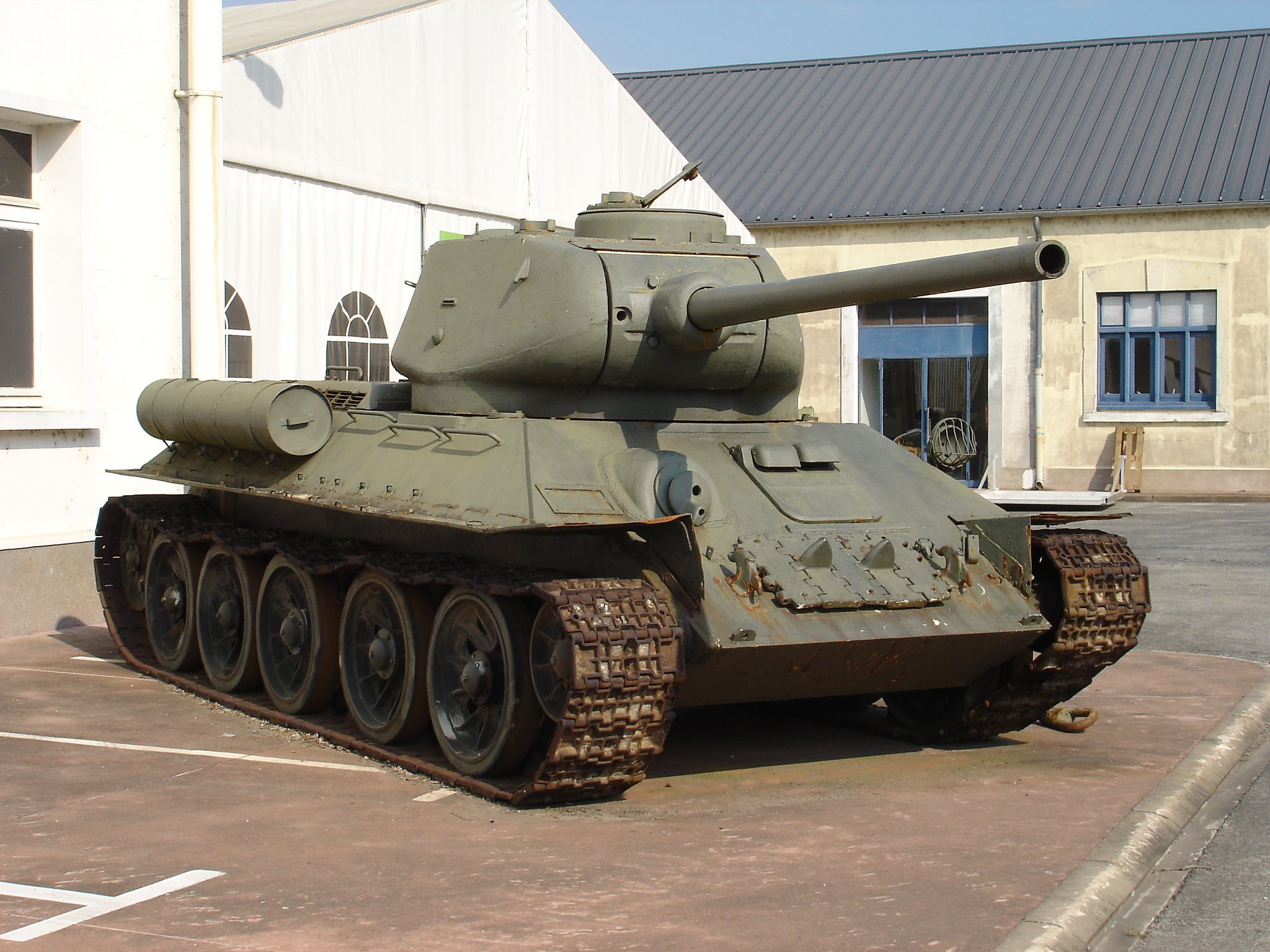
A Soviet T-34-85 tank on display at the Musée des Blindés in April 2007

At the start of the Second World War much of the Red Army, including its armoured forces, was in transition and recovering from the 1937 repression of the officer corps. The Red Army ignored the lessons from Nomonhan, which had been successfully conducted by General Zhukov, and relied instead on lessons from politically selected officers who were veterans of the Spanish Civil War. The result was a poor showing during the Winter War. The Red Army tank fleet was extremely large, consisting of some 24,000 vehicles, but many were obsolete or unfit for service due to difficulties with supplying spare parts and lack of qualified support staff. Significant pushes to boost tank production over the course of the war partially resolved this problem, and from 1941 to 1945 production of tanks and self-propelled guns totalled 102,800.

One important development took place shortly before the war, which influenced Soviet armoured doctrine and tank design for a decade: the creation of the T-34. Developed on the Christie suspension chassis and using sloped armour for the first time, the T-34 proved a shock to the German forces in the first German encounter of Soviet T-34 and KV tanks. The T-34 had an excellent combination of mobility, protection and firepower. Using wide tracks, the T-34 was also able to negotiate terrain in difficult weather conditions, something that persistently dogged the German designs.

Assessing the success of the German Blitzkrieg strategy, operational methods and tactics, the Red Army concluded that it should return to the use of operational methods developed before the war, so the Tank Armies were eventually created. To complement the T-34, heavy tanks, self-propelled artillery, and tank destroyers were also designed. The Red Army's armoured forces were used in concentrations during all strategic operations of the Red Army in World War II, initiated under strict secrecy and using the Principle of Surprise. Furthermore, to improve the fighting capabilities of armoured units, all heavy and medium tanks were to be commanded by officers and crewed by NCOs.

Significant concentrations of tanks did end up being used during the war. The Battle of Kursk especially is cited as an example of a tank battle.

=== Germany ===
In Germany, in-depth research through theoretical approaches, wargaming and exercises developed a confidence within the Panzertruppe itself (and political support by Hitler) in the armoured formation as the key battlefield formation – although this view was before 1940 not shared by the other Arms of Service. A key part of this doctrine was improved communications by having radios in all tanks, although this ideal suffered from technical limits as most tanks had receiver sets only.

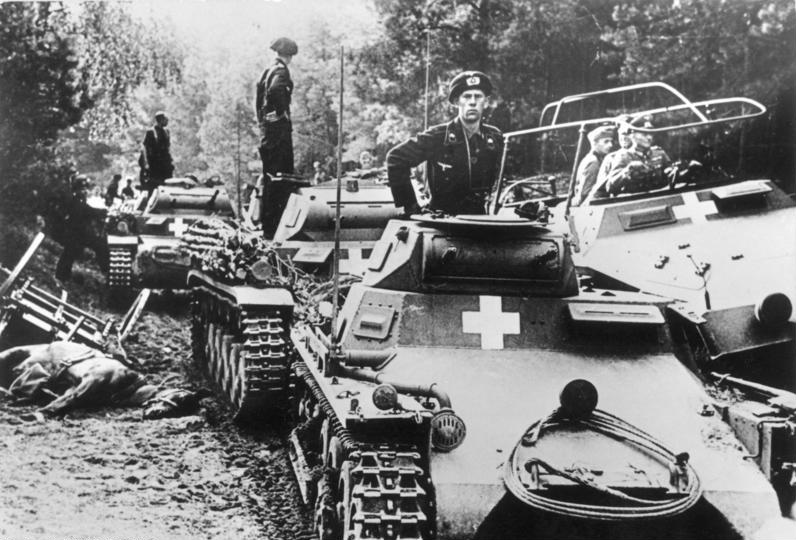
General Heinz Guderian (right edge in the Sd.Kfz. 251/3) commanding an advance for XIX Army Corps during the invasion of Poland.

At the outbreak of World War II, the German armoured forces benefited from a much more profound and more flexible training than that of the Allies on the tactical and operational level. German tanks operated while directed by radio communication, which allowed tank commanders to take greater advantage of the manoeuvrability of their vehicles.

Even after the conquest of Poland, "Blitzkrieg" was not defined on the strategic level. Guderian and von Manstein devised a strategy that entailed what later would be seen as the essence of Blitzkrieg: concentrated panzer divisions performing swift deep penetrations. This strategy was not initially accepted by German High Command. Nevertheless, the final plans for the invasion of France in 1940 hinged on the element of a Schwerpunkt at Sedan, and was assigned to such forces. The great success of this operation led to Blitzkrieg being integrated with strategic planning for the rest of the war.

German tanks could carry with them enough fuel and supplies to go almost two hundred kilometers, and enough food to last three to nine days. This relative independence from supply lines proved effective, and allowed them to advance on critical targets much faster and without hesitation. Another factor was the ability of commanders to make strategic decisions in the field and without much consultation with their headquarters, the orders of which were often simply ignored. A prime example is Erwin Rommel's lead-from-the-front approach while commanding VII Panzer-Division which allowed him a flexible response to the battlefield situation, an instance of the Auftragstaktik (reliance on subordinates to make their own decisions).

The effect of German Panzer's speed, mobility, and communication shocked the French, and ultimately were the deciding factors in the battle. It overcame their inferiority in armour and armament relative to the main French materiel such as the Char B1 bis. The superior tactical and operational praxis, combined with an appropriate strategic implementation, enabled the Germans to defeat forces superior in armour (both quantitatively and qualitatively) in the battles of 1940, but just as Blitzkrieg became a deliberate military doctrine, in 1941, it ultimately failed on the eastern front, though initially attaining spectacular successes.

Before the war, Heinz Guderian had in his Achtung–Panzer! propounded a thorough mechanisation of the German forces. By 1942, increased AFV-production allowed a fuller implementation of this ideal. Now extensive armoured combined arms team could be formed, distinct from a purely infantry or cavalry formation. The panzer divisions integrated tanks with mechanised infantry (riding in halftracks to be protected from small-arms fire while being transported) and self-propelled artillery (howitzers fitted on a tank chassis). This allowed the panzer division to become an independent combat force, in principle able to overcome the problems of attaining a breakthrough against entrenched enemy infantry, equipped with large numbers of antitank-guns, with the potential to completely halt tank assaults inflicting devastating losses to armoured units without infantry support. However, much of the AFV production was increasingly diverted away from the Panzertruppe. The Artillery formed its own Sturmgeschütz units and infantry divisions were given their own Panzerjäger companies. Despite lowering their formal organic strength, from the summer of 1943 onwards, the armoured divisions were structurally short of tanks.

=== United States ===
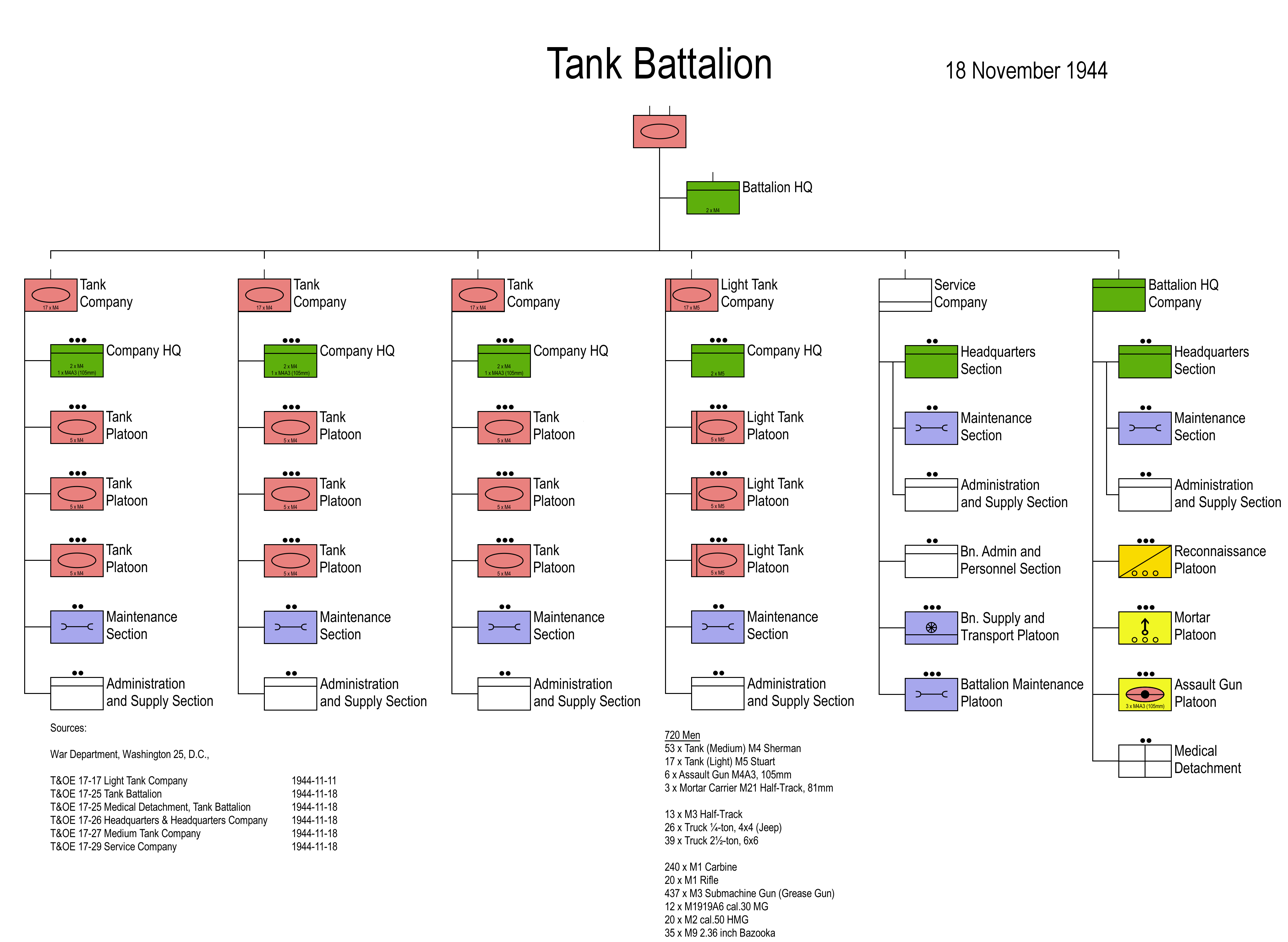
Structure of a U.S. tank battalion in November 1944. Each battalion had 53 M4 Sherman medium tanks and 17 M5 Stuart light tanks. Heavy armoured divisions had 6 battalions (318 M4 Tanks, 102 M5 Tanks) while light armoured divisions had 3 (159 M4 Tanks, 51 M5 Tanks). Many U.S. infantry divisions had a permanent tank battalion attached during the length of the war in Europe.

Though the U.S. had established the Tank Corps in World War I using French Renault FT light tanks and British Mark V and Mark V* heavy tanks, and some officers like Dwight D. Eisenhower and George S. Patton, Jr. emerged from that war initially as avid proponents of continuing and developing an American armoured force, the rapid reduction of the forces and apathy and even antipathy towards funding and maintaining armed forces in the inter-war years led to relative stagnation of armoured doctrine in the United States. Adna R. Chaffee, Jr., virtually alone, advocated for the future of armoured warfare and the development of appropriate training, equipment and doctrine during the late 1920s through the 1930s.

The United States Army regarded the French Army as the best army in Europe, and consequently the U.S. Army frequently copied French uniforms (the American Civil War) and aeroplanes. Only when France was rapidly overrun in 1940 did the U.S. Army become "shocked" into re-thinking the influences by the perceived actions of German tanks in the 1939 Polish Campaign. Its Armored Combat Arm was not created until 1940 when the Armored Force was born on 10 July 1940, with the Headquarters, Armor Force and the Headquarters, I Armored Corps established at Fort Knox. On July 15, 1940, the 7th Cavalry Brigade (Mechanised) became the 1st Armored Division; the 7th Provisional Tank Brigade, an infantry tank unit at Fort Benning, became the 2nd Armored Division". The Tank Battalion was established at Fort Meade, Md., and a small Armored Force School was also established.

Under this doctrine, U.S. tank crews of both armoured divisions and GHQ tank battalions were taught to fight tanks in tank on tank engagements. Armoured force personnel during and after the war criticised the infantry for using the GHQ tank battalions assigned to infantry divisions strictly as infantry support.

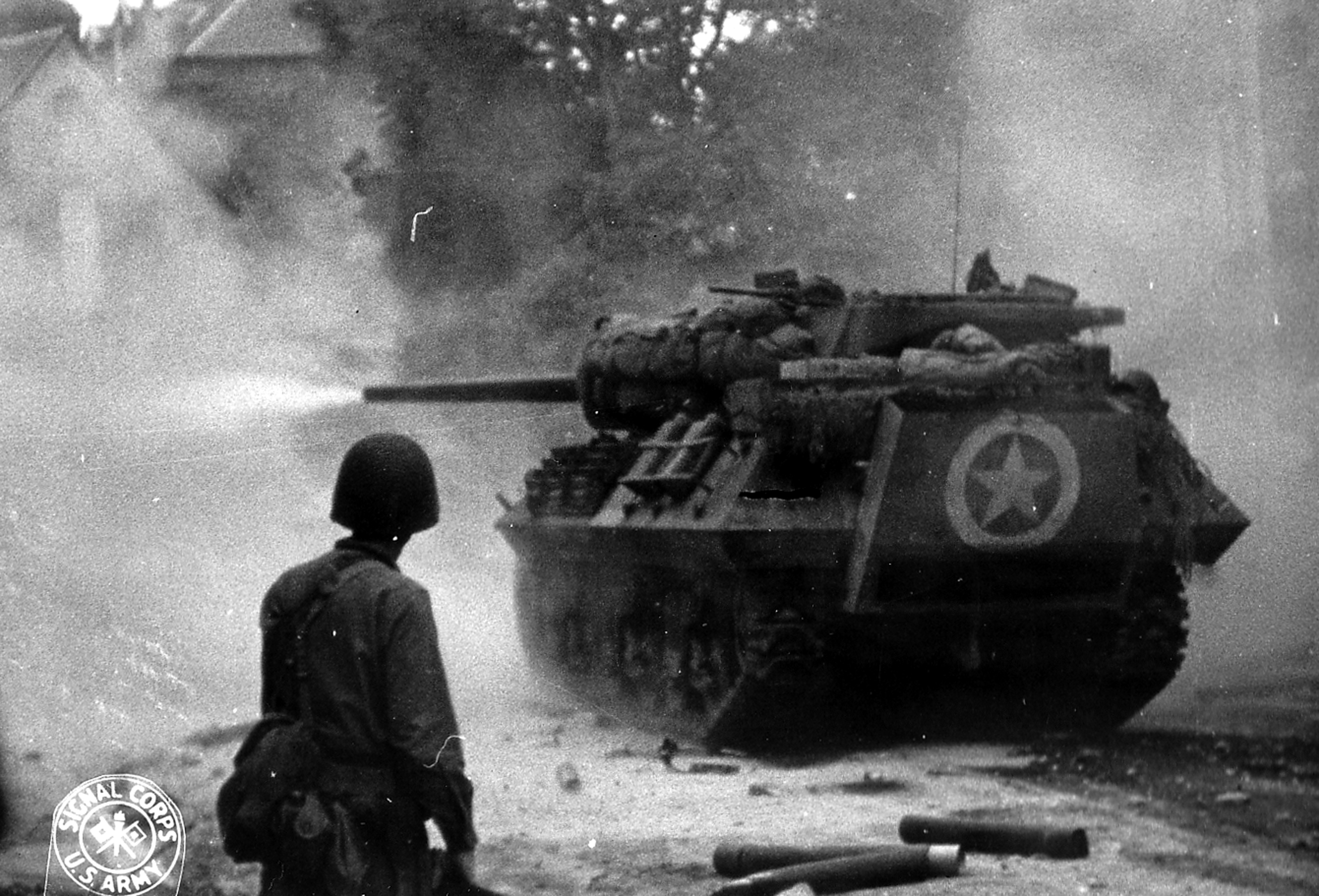
M10 GMC tank destroyer in action near Saint-Lô, June 1944

==== Tank destroyers ====
The U.S. combined arms team included air support, artillery, engineers, and a tank component supplemented by tank destroyers formed into independent tank destroyer battalions. The latter is most closely identified with the Chief of Army Ground Forces, Lesley J. McNair. Having studied the early German successes McNair came under the belief that U.S. forces would be faced with fast moving enemy forces who would seek to bypass, isolate and reduce U.S. forces in a replay of the Fall of France. To stem the flood of marauding panzers, fast moving powerfully armed tank destroyer battalions were created to be held back and used in the counter-attack.

It was also calculated that U.S. interests would be better served by large numbers of reliable (battle-worthiness) medium tanks rather than a smaller number of unreliable heavy tanks. It was decided therefore to slow the production of the U.S. heavy tank designs such as the M26 Pershing and concentrate resources on mass-producing the M4 Sherman and tank destroyers such as the M18 Hellcat.

To be able get into position to counter-attack, the tank destroyers had to be fast. To achieve the desired mobility and agility from the engines available the armour protection was sacrificed, a measure of protection coming from being nimble and hopefully from being able to knock out the enemy before they could get a shot in. Although they usually had guns of either 75 mm or 76 mm calibre (the M36 used a 90mm calibre gun), the tank destroyer units were issued with the ancestor of the modern armour-piercing discarding sabot, rounds which made their guns much more powerful than a simple comparison of calibres would suggest.

=== Japan ===
The Japanese doctrine was mainly French in concept but with some purely Japanese elements. Due to Japan's naval priorities in warship construction and inter-service feuds (the marine branch of the IJN favoured all-around protective armour), IJA tanks were lightly armoured. As with most armour during the 1930s, the main guns were small in calibre: 37 mm for their Type 95 Ha-Go light tanks and 57 mm for the Type 97 Chi-Ha medium tank, but this was sometimes compensated by a high muzzle velocity. The IJA's use of tanks in China exemplifies its doctrine: light tanks were used for scouting or acted as mobile infantry support, while medium tanks supported the infantry and assaulted deeper objectives, but did not fight en masse formations.

In 1939, the Japanese Army engaged Soviet armour at Nomonhan. During the three-month-long war, Japanese armour had shown their weakness against Soviet tanks. The resulting Japanese defeat prompted a series of complaints by the Imperial Army to incorporate improvements in future Japanese armour. This is the primary reason IJA tanks were not as successful while being used with IJA tactics. The tank forces of the U.S. Army consisted of the M2A4 and M3 Stuart light tanks up until 1941, although these vehicles were five years newer than the 1935 built Type 95 Ha-Go's, the IJA and U.S. light tanks were comparable to each other, and seemingly performed well for their respective forces during jungle combat operations; during their phase of World War II.

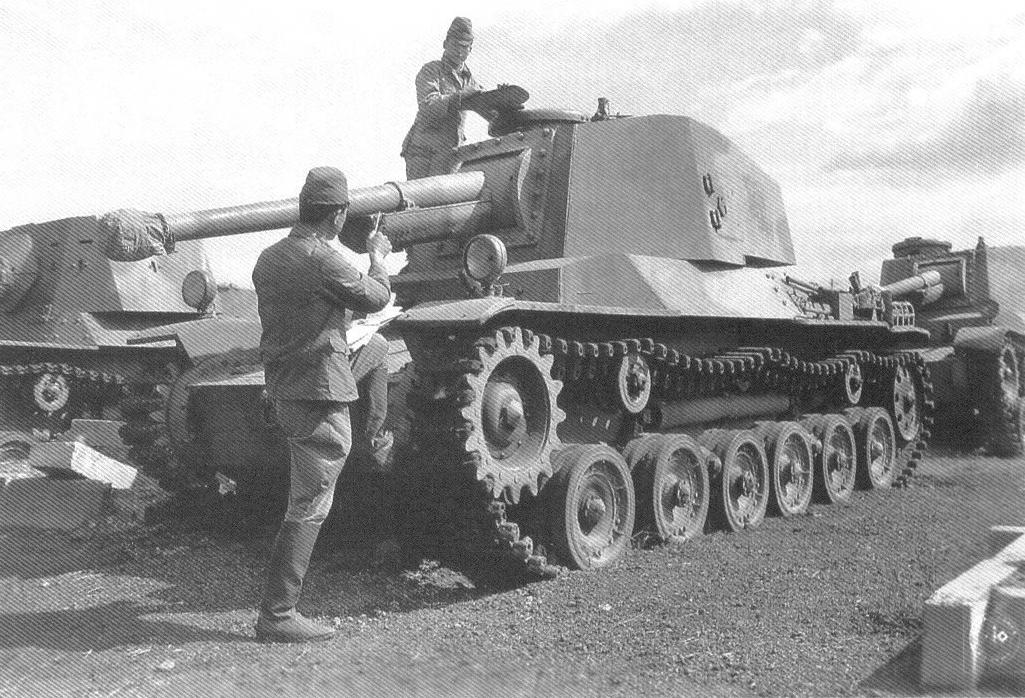
Japanese Type 3 Chi-Nu medium tank of the 4th Armored Division on Kyushu in 1945

As with all armour, maintenance was a continuous challenge; especially in tropical environments. When IJA and SNLF (Imperial marines) tanks did clash with the enemy they were destroyed by anti-tank guns or overwhelming numbers of hostile tanks. Japan was mainly a naval power, and with the beginning of the Pacific War, Japan's priorities shifted to warships and aircraft production. Resources for development and production of armoured vehicles for the Army were given low priority. This led to its tanks becoming quickly obsolete during the later years of the war. A number of designs that were equal to heavier foreign types were on the drawing board during the last years of the war, but production could not advance beyond small numbers or the prototype stage due to material shortages, and the loss of Japan's industrial infrastructure by the Allied bombing of Japan. In addition, these tanks and tank-destroyers were placed in reserve, to be deployed for the expected defence of the Japanese home islands.

=== China ===
The Republic of China's National Revolutionary Army's 200th Division was the country's only mechanised division during the war. The 200th used pre-war tanks acquired from Italy, Germany, and the Soviet Union.

== After 1945 ==
=== Arab–Israeli wars ===
The conflict between Arab nations in the East Mediterranean region and Israel in particular would serve to become a testing ground for development in armoured warfare during the decades of the Cold War. Both sides in the Arab–Israeli series of conflicts made heavy use of tanks and other armoured vehicles due to the practicality of tanks in the desert environment these conflicts largely took place in.

During the 1956 Suez War and Six-Day War (1967), Israeli armoured units typically had the advantage, mainly due to good tactics and unit cohesion.

Conversely, the Yom Kippur War (1973) illustrated the problems that can arise if armoured and infantry units do not work closely together. Israeli tanks, operating independently in large numbers, were decimated by Egyptian anti-tank teams, well-distributed amongst regular infantry, and often equipped with new, first-generation portable anti-tank guided missiles. This is an extreme example but exemplifies what has been fairly thoroughly documented since the Second World War: tanks and infantry work best by taking advantage of each other's strengths and combining to minimise the weaknesses.

In many conflicts, it was usual to see infantry riding on the back of tanks, ready to jump off and provide support when necessary. Unfortunately, the design of many modern tanks makes this a dangerous practice. The turboshaft-powered M1 Abrams, for example, has such hot exhaust gas that nearby infantry have to be careful where they stand. Tanks can also be very vulnerable to well aimed artillery; well-coordinated air support and counter-battery artillery units can help overcome this.

=== Emergence of guided missiles ===
While attempts to defeat the tank were made before and during the Second World War, through the use of conventional high velocity anti-tank artillery, this proved increasingly difficult in the post-war period due to increased armour protection and mobility of tanks.

In response, the Soviet Union, the country with the largest armoured fleet in the world, strove to incorporate some anti-tank capability into almost every infantry weapon. By the 1960s, Soviet defence scientists were designing portable anti-tank guided missiles. These new weapons were to be either carried by infantry, or fired from the newly developed BMP-1 infantry fighting vehicle. They were in use with Soviet forces before the end of the decade.

In 1973, the Israeli Army failed to anticipate the importance of these new weapon systems. Hundreds of AT-3 Sagger man-portable anti-tank guided missiles (ATGMs), supplied to Egypt by the Soviet Union and could be operated by infantry without having extensive training, inflicted heavy losses on the Israeli armoured formations. Since then, ATGMs have played an important role within the Israeli Army, having developed advanced domestic-made versions (see Spike/Gil missile), which have been widely exported throughout the world.

In the recent 2006 conflict with Hezbollah, while Israeli infantry were able to easily defeat opposing ATGM teams, tanks operating on their own suffered several hits from the latest advanced Russian tandem-warhead types (such as the Kornet). This highlighted that tanks operating solely, in the era of ATGMs, are extremely vulnerable.

Responding to the serious tank losses suffered against Hezbollah, Rafael Advanced Defense Systems in cooperation with Israel Aircraft Industries developed a missile defence system for tanks, called Trophy, to intercept and destroy anti tank missiles. The system was successfully deployed in combat on March 1, 2011, when it intercepted an anti tank missile during an engagement on the Gaza border.

=== NATO ===
During the Cold War, NATO assumed armoured warfare to be a dominant aspect of conventional ground warfare in Europe. Although the use of light tanks was largely discontinued, and heavy tanks were also mostly abandoned, the medium tank design evolved into heavier models due to increase in armour and larger sized main weapon resulting in the main battle tank (MBT) which came into existence, combining most of the different types of tanks during World War II.

For the most part the NATO armoured doctrine remained defensive, and dominated by use of nuclear weapons as deterrence. Although most NATO nations began the Cold War period with a large number of U.S.-designed tanks in their fleets, there was a considerable degree of disagreement on the design of future MBTs among the NATO major nations. Both the U.S. and Germany experimented with, but abandoned the missile-armed MBT-70. The M26 Pershing basic design of the United States would evolve until the M60 main battle tank was replaced with the gas-turbine powered M1 Abrams in the 1980s. The British Army also retained a World War II tank design, the Centurion, which proved to be highly successful and was not fully replaced until the 1970s.

The West German Bundeswehr decided to develop their own tank in the 1960s, and in the 1970s produced the Leopard I, which was a somewhat lighter design, conforming to German doctrine that emphasised speed over protection. From the same initial collaborative project as the Leopard I, the French series of AMX tanks also emphasised manoeuvre over protection. By the 21st century, most advanced western main battle tanks were built around powerful engines, large 120 mm guns and composite armour.

=== Warsaw Pact ===
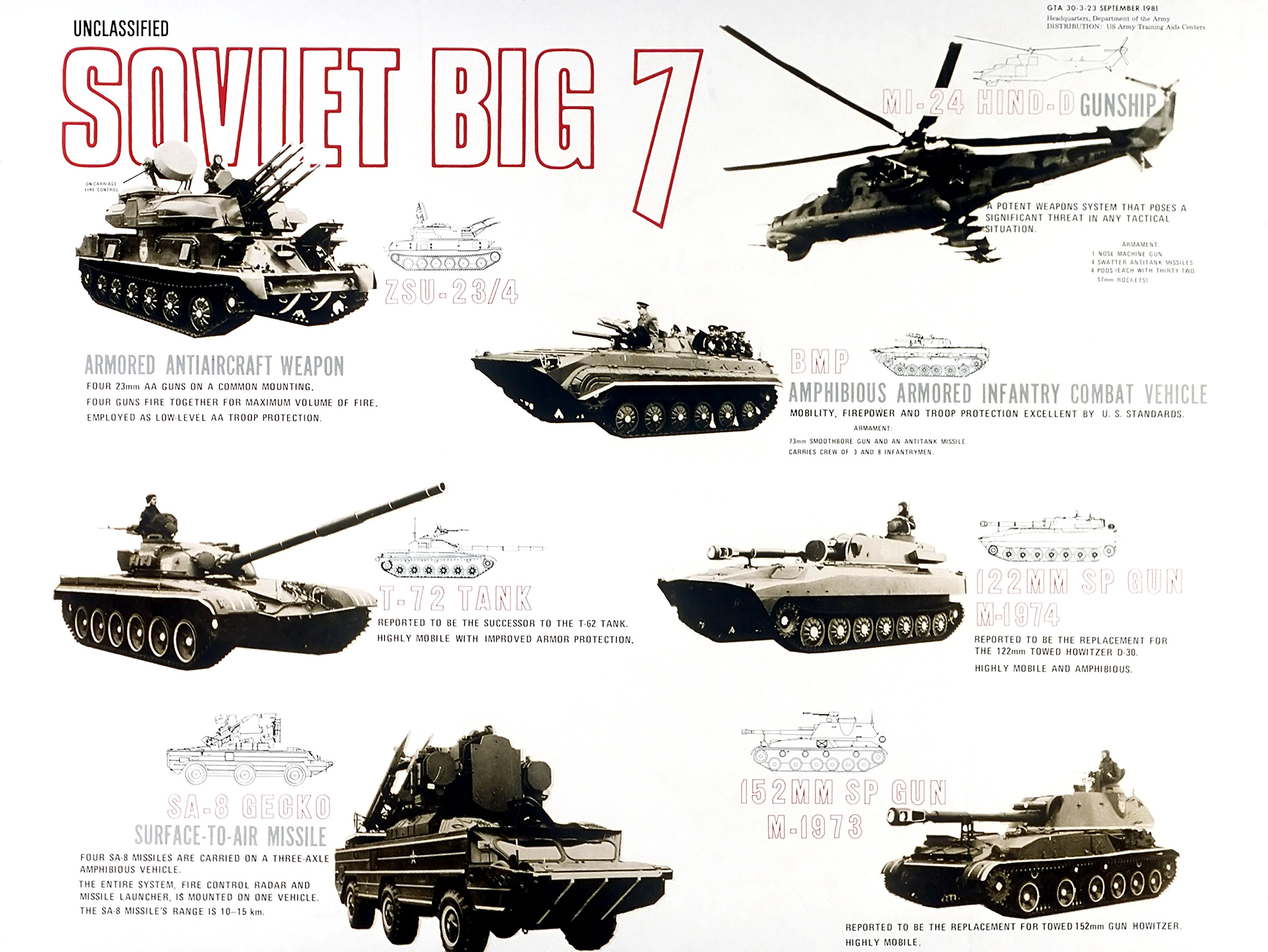
Warsaw Pact "Big Seven" threats

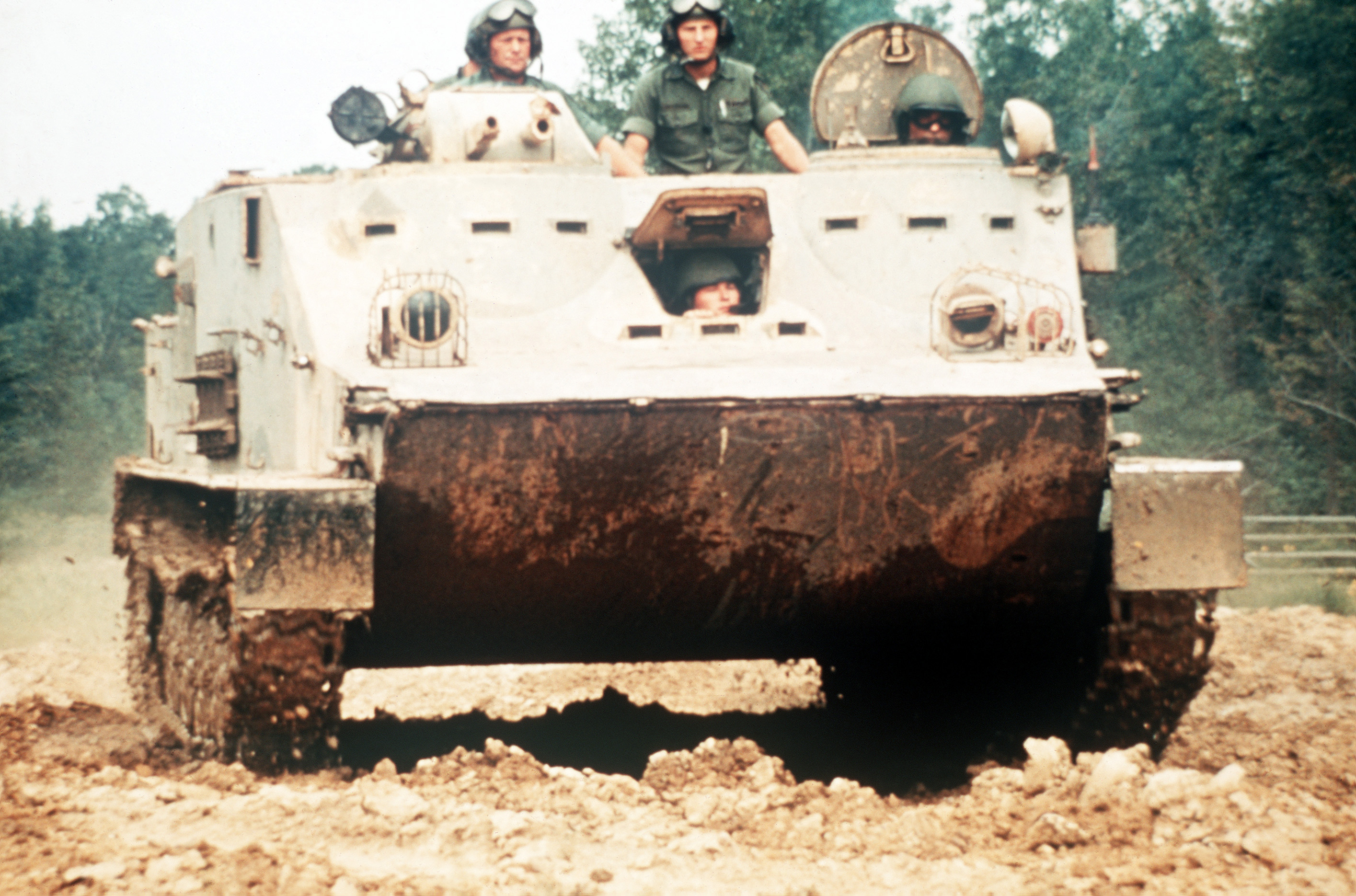
Czechoslovak armoured personnel carrier OT-62 TOPAS, produced by Podpolianske strojárne Detva in Slovakia

The Warsaw Pact armoured doctrine was substantially influenced by the developments in the Soviet Army which sought to adopt its existing doctrine evolved during World War II to the nuclear battlefield. In the early 1960s this led to a number of important developments in the armoured forces and their supporting Arms. One important development was the transition of the Second World War use of Cavalry-Mechanised Group (CMG) into the Cold War Operational Manoeuvre Group (OMG) that was designed to exploit breakthroughs to penetrate NATO's defences in depth. This was a culmination of the Deep Battle theory dating to the 1930s.

In 1964 a significant breakthrough in tank design was achieved in the Soviet Union when the T-64 was produced which for the first time used an automatic loader, reducing the crew of the tank to three crewmen. Subsequently, this model, and the later T-72 and T-80 tanks introduced further innovations that influenced armoured warfare by introducing guided missiles into the tank ammunition mix, allowing ATGW fire from standard tank guns. The Soviet Union was also one of the countries that used two Main Battle Tanks: The high-quality T-80s and lower quality T-72s. Modern Soviet tanks, like the ones mentioned, are typically armed with 125 mm (5 in) smooth bore guns. Advancements in Soviet tanks include improved Fire Control Systems, strong armour protected by ERA, and defensive countermeasures (such as Shtora-1 and Arena). The most advanced Soviet tank, up until the end of the Cold War, was the T-80U, which shared similar characteristics with the M1A1(Turbine engine, advanced Fire Control Systems, strong armour, and firepower)

Infantry fighting vehicles were first developed in the 1960s with the Soviet Union's BMP-1, for the first time allowing supporting infantry to accompany tanks on a battlefield when nuclear weapon use was expected.

The T-64s and BMP-1s were also joined by the self-propelled guns and more importantly Mi-24 Rotary-wing aircraft capable of firing anti-tank missiles entering production in 1970 which were built and theorised as "flying tanks".

The Soviet tank troops, as they were known in the USSR, included armoured units, armoured training regiments and other formations and units.

=== Vietnam War ===
M113 armoured personnel carriers proved effective in the terrain of Vietnam against enemy forces which, until 1968, rarely deployed their armour. Though they were soon countered with mines and RPGs, M-113's continued service during the war, primarily evolving into infantry fighting vehicles, known as the ACAV (Armoured Cavalry Assault Vehicle); and functioning as a "light tank."

More heavily armed infantry fighting vehicles such as the M2/M3 Bradley Fighting Vehicle would be based on experience with the M113. Gun trucks were also introduced as M35 trucks fitted with armour and guns to protect convoys. In 1968, Communist forces primarily deployed the Soviet built PT-76 light tank.

By 1971, the larger T-54 medium tanks were fielded, proving themselves susceptible to the M-72 LAW rocket, ARVN M41 Walker Bulldog light tanks, as well as the larger M48A3 Pattons. In January 1969, U.S. armoured cavalry units began exchanging their M48A3 Patton tanks for the M551 Sheridan Armoured Airborne Reconnaissance Assault Vehicles; by 1970 over 200 Sheridan tanks were operating in Vietnam.

== 21st century ==
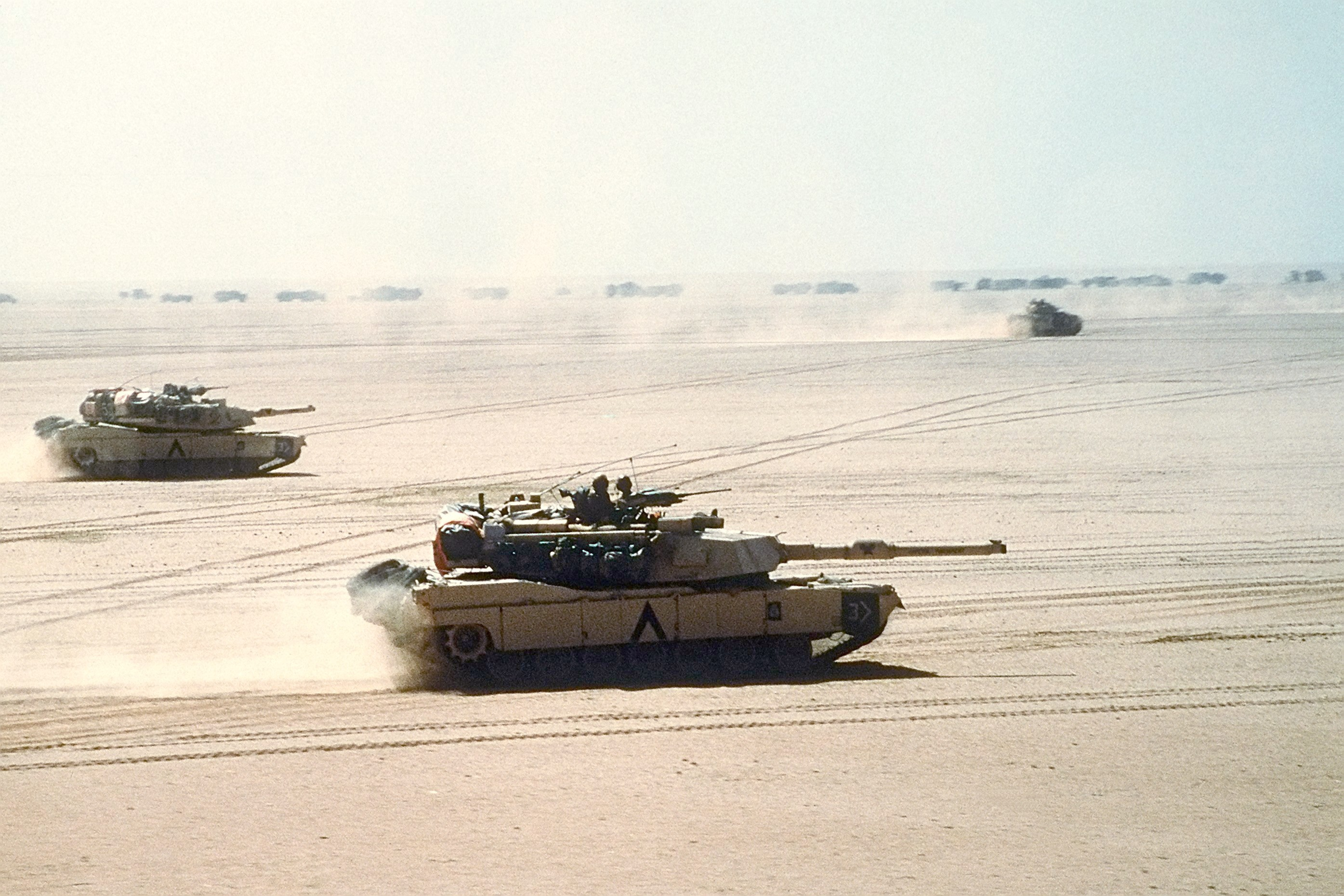
A combined force of M1 Abrams tanks, Bradley IFVs and a logistical convoy advancing during the Gulf War

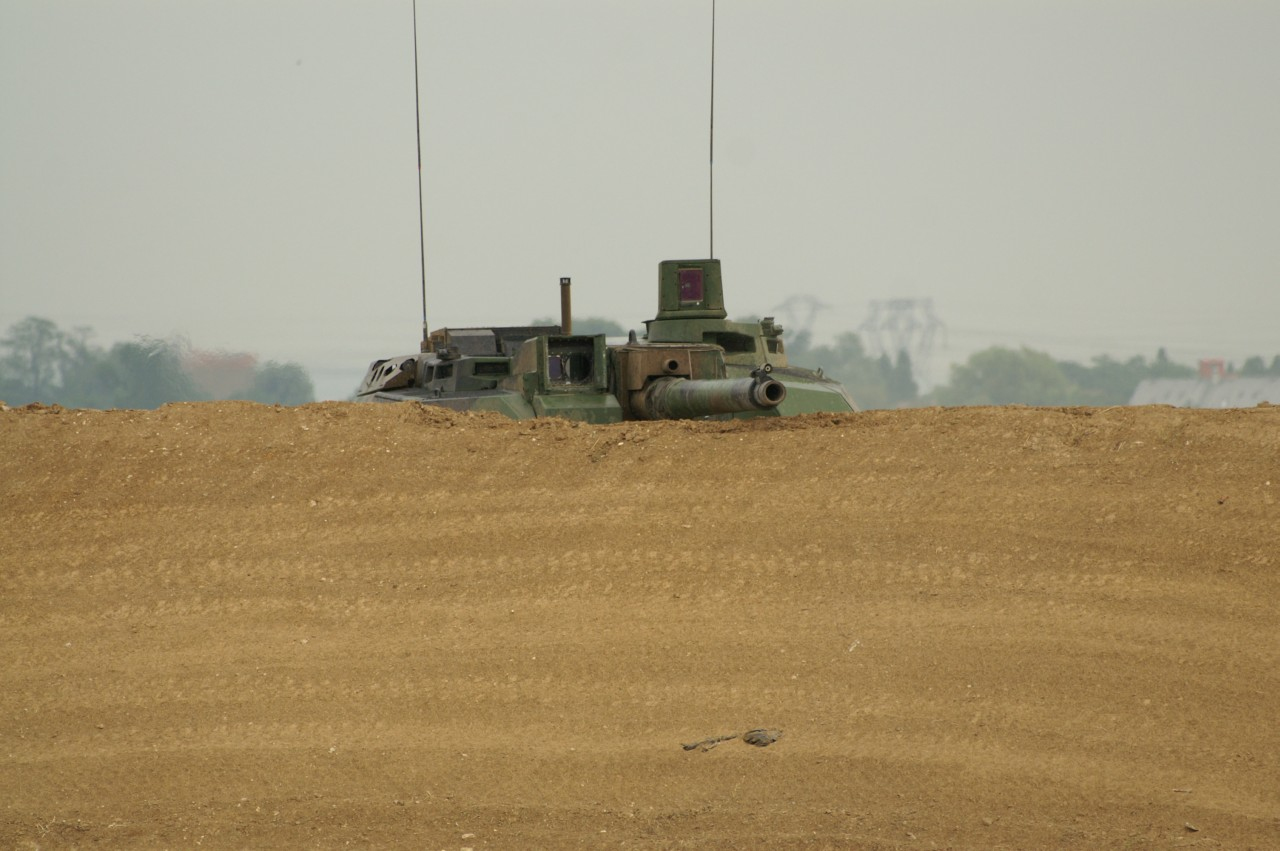
A Leclerc tank in a hull-down position. Note the observation periscope which would allow the commander to observe in turret-down position.

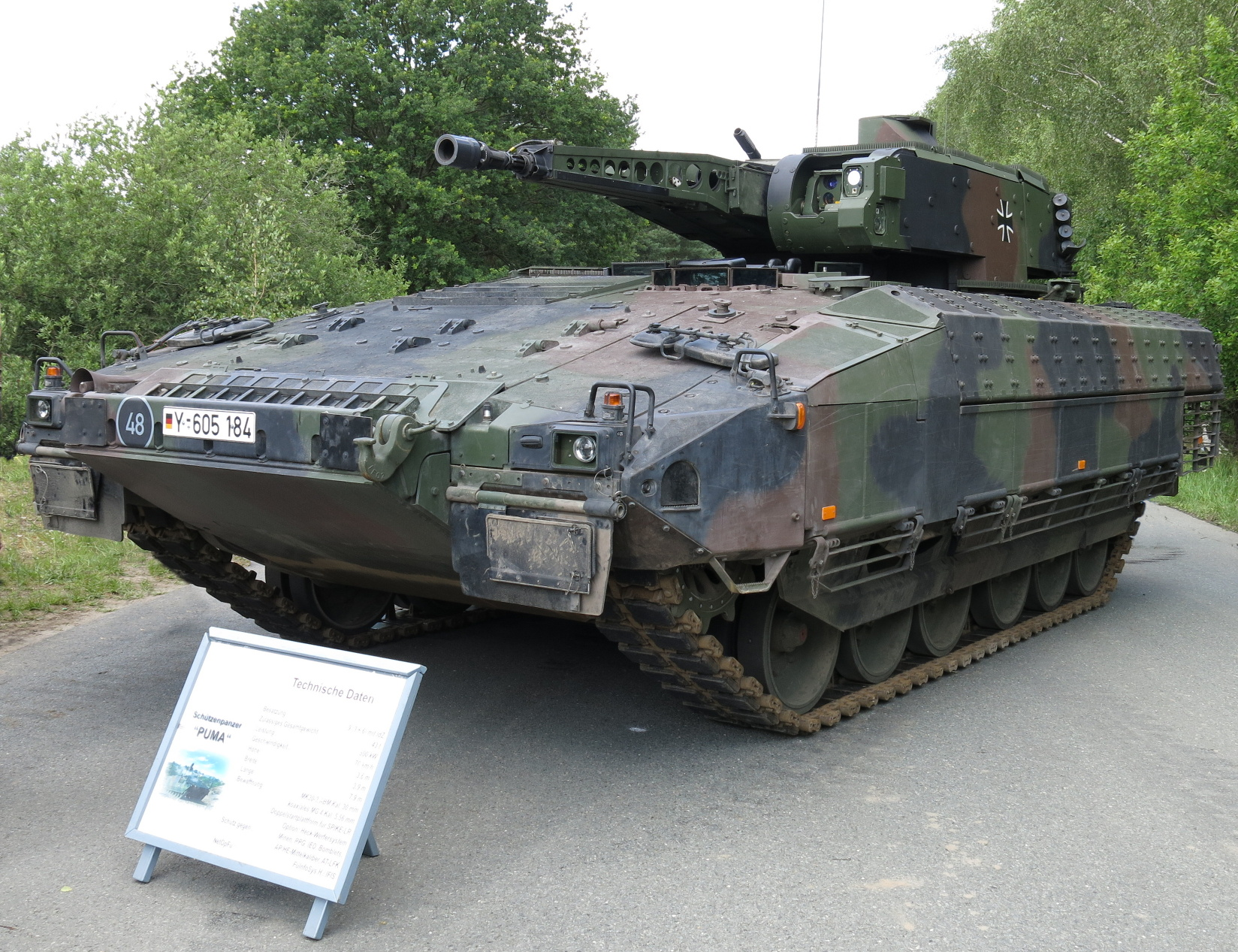
The German Puma is a well protected infantry fighting vehicle capable of delivering troops to the frontline.

Tanks rarely work alone; the usual minimum unit size is a platoon (a platoon is the smallest U.S. Army/Marine unit led by an officer, and a component of a company or troop) of three to five tanks. The tanks of the platoon work together providing mutual support: two might advance while covered by the others then stop and provide cover for the remainder to move ahead.

Normally, multiple platoons coordinate with mechanised infantry and use their mobility and firepower to penetrate weak points in enemy lines. This is where the powerful engines, tracks and turrets come into play. The ability to rotate the turret by a full 360° allows coordinated movement within and between platoons, while defending against attacks from multiple directions and engaging troops and vehicles without stopping or slowing down.

When on the defensive, they wait in prepared positions or use any natural terrain elements (such as small hills) for cover. A tank sitting just behind a hill crest ("hull-down") exposes only the top of its turret, with the gun and sensors, to the enemy, leaving the smallest possible target while allowing it to engage the enemy on the other side of the hill. Tanks are usually able to depress the main gun below the horizontal since modern kinetic energy (KE) rounds have nearly flat trajectories. Without this they would be unable to exploit such positions. However, upon cresting a hill, the tank may expose its thinly armoured underside to enemy weapons.

The disposition of armour around a tank is not uniform; the front is typically better armoured than the sides or rear. Accordingly, normal practice is to keep the front towards the enemy at all times; the tank retreats by reversing instead of turning around. Driving backwards away from an enemy is even safer than driving forwards towards them since driving forwards over a bump can throw the front of the tank up in the air, exposing the thin armour of the underside and taking the gun off the target due to its limited angle of depression.

The tracks, wheels and suspension of a tank are outside the armoured hull and are some of the most vulnerable spots. The easiest way to disable a tank (other than a direct hit in a vulnerable area with a full-power anti-tank weapon) is to target the tracks for a "mobility kill" (m-kill), or target all external visual aids with rubbery cohesive substances such as melted rubber or blackened high viscosity epoxy resins. Once a tank is disabled it is easier to destroy. This is why side-skirts are an important feature; they can deflect heavy machine-gun bullets and trigger the detonation of high-explosive anti-tank (HEAT) rounds before they strike the running gear. Other vulnerable parts of a typical tank include the engine deck (with air intakes, radiators, etc.) and the turret ring, where the turret joins the hull.

When used defensively, tanks are often sunk into trenches or placed behind earth berms for increased protection. The tanks can fire off a few shots from their defensive position, then retreat (reversing) to another prepared position further back and drive behind the berms or into the trenches there. These positions can be constructed by the tank crews, but preparations are better and quicker if carried out by combat engineers with bulldozers. Overhead protection, even if it is fairly thin, can also be very useful since it can help pre-detonate artillery shells and avoid direct hits from above which can be deadly to tanks, by striking them at their thinnest armour. In short, tank crews find as many ways as possible to augment the armour on their vehicles.

Tanks usually go into battle with a round in the gun, ready to fire, to minimise reaction time when encountering an enemy. The US doctrine calls for this round to be a kinetic energy (KE) round, as the reaction time is most important when meeting enemy tanks, to get the first shot (and possibly the first kill). If troops or light vehicles are encountered, the usual response is to fire this round at them, despite it not being ideal—it is difficult and time-consuming to remove a round which is already in the breech. In this case, after the KE round is fired, a HEAT round would normally be loaded next to continue the engagement.

Tanks can be decisive in city fighting, with the ability to demolish walls and fire medium and heavy machine guns in several directions simultaneously. However, tanks are especially vulnerable in urban combat. It is much easier for enemy infantry to sneak up behind a tank or fire at its sides, where it is most vulnerable. In addition, firing down from multi-story buildings allows shots at the thin upper turret armour and even basic weapons like Molotov cocktails, if aimed at the engine air intakes, can disable a tank. Because of these limits, tanks are difficult to use in city conflicts where civilians or friendly forces might be nearby, since their firepower can't be used effectively.

Some analysts argue that recent conflicts, like the Russian invasion of Ukraine, highlight the growing vulnerability of tanks. Estimates from early 2024 indicate that Russia has lost around 3,000 tanks in the first two years of the conflict, with the actual number likely being higher. In contrast, during the Gaza war, Israeli tanks equipped with active protection systems (APS) showed improved survivability against anti-tank missiles. Additionally, using tanks in pairs with overlapping APS provided extra defence and enhanced their overall effectiveness.

=== Airborne threats ===
Tanks and other armoured vehicles are vulnerable to attack from the air for several reasons. One is that they are easily detectable—the metal they are made of shows up well on radar, and is especially obvious if they are moving in formation. A moving tank also produces a lot of heat, noise and dust. The heat makes seeing them on a forward-looking infra-red system easy and the dust is a good visual cue during the day.

The other major reason is that most armoured vehicles have thinner armour on the roof of the turret and on the engine deck, so an anti-tank guided missile or bomb (from an attack helicopter, unmanned combat aerial vehicle, ground-attack jet or small drone) hitting them from the top can be deadly even if it has a small warhead. Even a small automatic cannon is powerful enough to penetrate the rear and top sections of the engine compartment of a tank. Loitering munition (suicide drone) is also used to attack tanks in modern warfare.

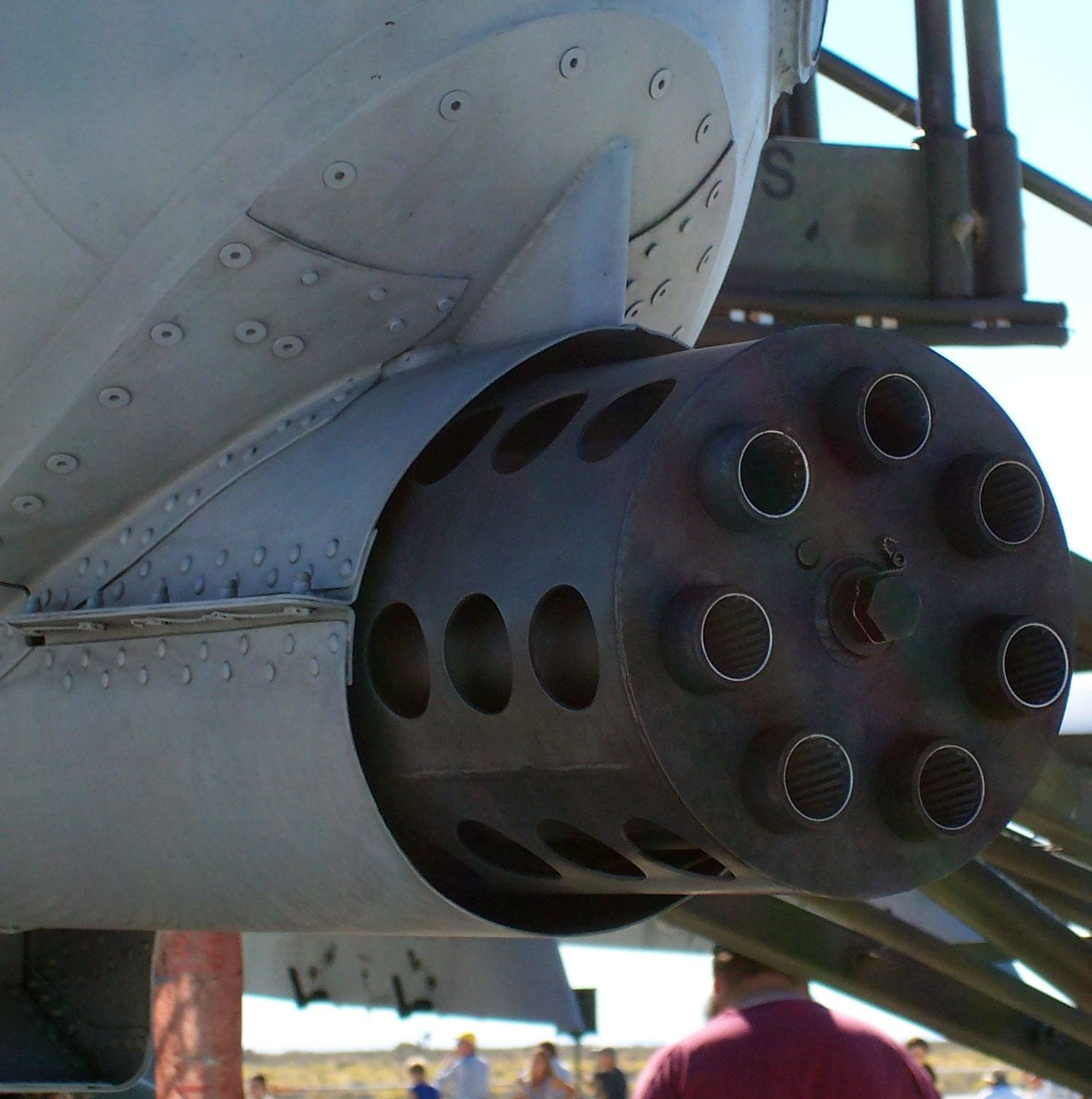
Close-up of an A-10 GAU-8 Avenger gun

Certain aircraft have been developed to attack armoured vehicles. Most notable is the purpose-built Fairchild-Republic A-10 Thunderbolt II, also known as the "Warthog". Although able to carry a number of different missiles and bombs (including anti-tank ordnance such as the AGM-65 Maverick), the A-10's main weapon is a 30 mm GAU-8/A Avenger Gatling gun which is capable of firing 3,900 depleted uranium armour-piercing rounds per minute. The Russian equivalent is the SU-25.

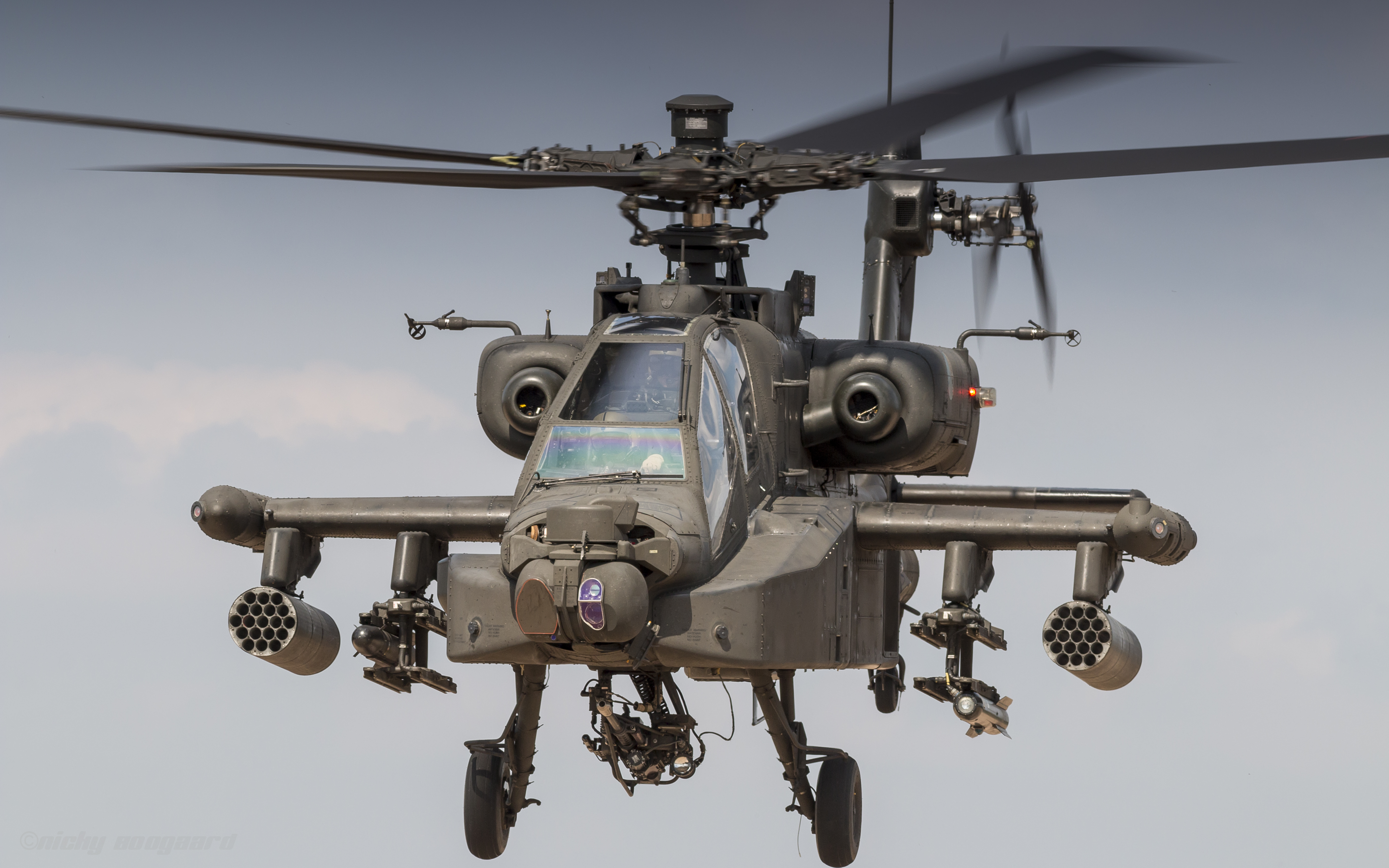
AH-64 Apache, an attack helicopter designed to destroy armoured vehicles

Similarly, a number of helicopter gunships have been designed mainly to engage enemy armoured vehicles. The AH-1Z Viper, AH-64 Apache, HAL Light Combat Helicopter, Denel Rooivalk, Eurocopter Tiger, Ka-50 Black Shark, Mi-28 Havoc, A129 Mangusta and Westland Lynx are examples. Helicopters are very effective against armoured vehicles for many reasons. The AH-64D Longbow Apache, for example, is equipped with an improved sensor suite and weapon systems and the AN/APG-78 Longbow Fire Control Radar dome installed over the main rotor.

Airborne threats can be countered in several ways. One is air supremacy. This is what the United States relies on most, which is demonstrated by their distinct lack of effective short-range, mobile air defence vehicles to accompany armoured units. Most other countries accompany their armoured forces with highly mobile self-propelled anti-aircraft guns such as the German Gepard or the Soviet 9K22 Tunguska, short and medium-range surface-to-air missile systems such as the SA-6, SA-8 and SA-11, or combine both on the same vehicle (the Tunguska for example can also host SA-19 SAM missiles). The usage of anti-aircraft rounds fired from the main gun of a tank has been increasing over the years. An example is the HE-FRAG round from the T-90 which can be detonated at a set distance as determined by its laser range finder.

=== Engineering support ===
Armoured warfare is mechanically and logistically intensive and requires extensive support mechanisms. Armoured fighting vehicles require armoured vehicles capable of working in the same terrain to support them. These are operated by the appropriate branches of the army, e.g. recovery and maintenance vehicles by the REME and combat engineering vehicles by the RE in the British Army. These include:

- Armoured recovery vehicles (ARV)—many of these are based on the chassis for the vehicle they support. E.g. the ARV for the UK Challenger tank is a Challenger hull onto which a winch is added.
- Armoured supply vehicles
- Combat engineering vehicles (CEV), e.g. bulldozers

For transporting tracked AFVs over highways, heavy transporters are used, since AFVs are prone to malfunction and their tracks also ruin the highways.

=== Light tanks and tank destroyers ===
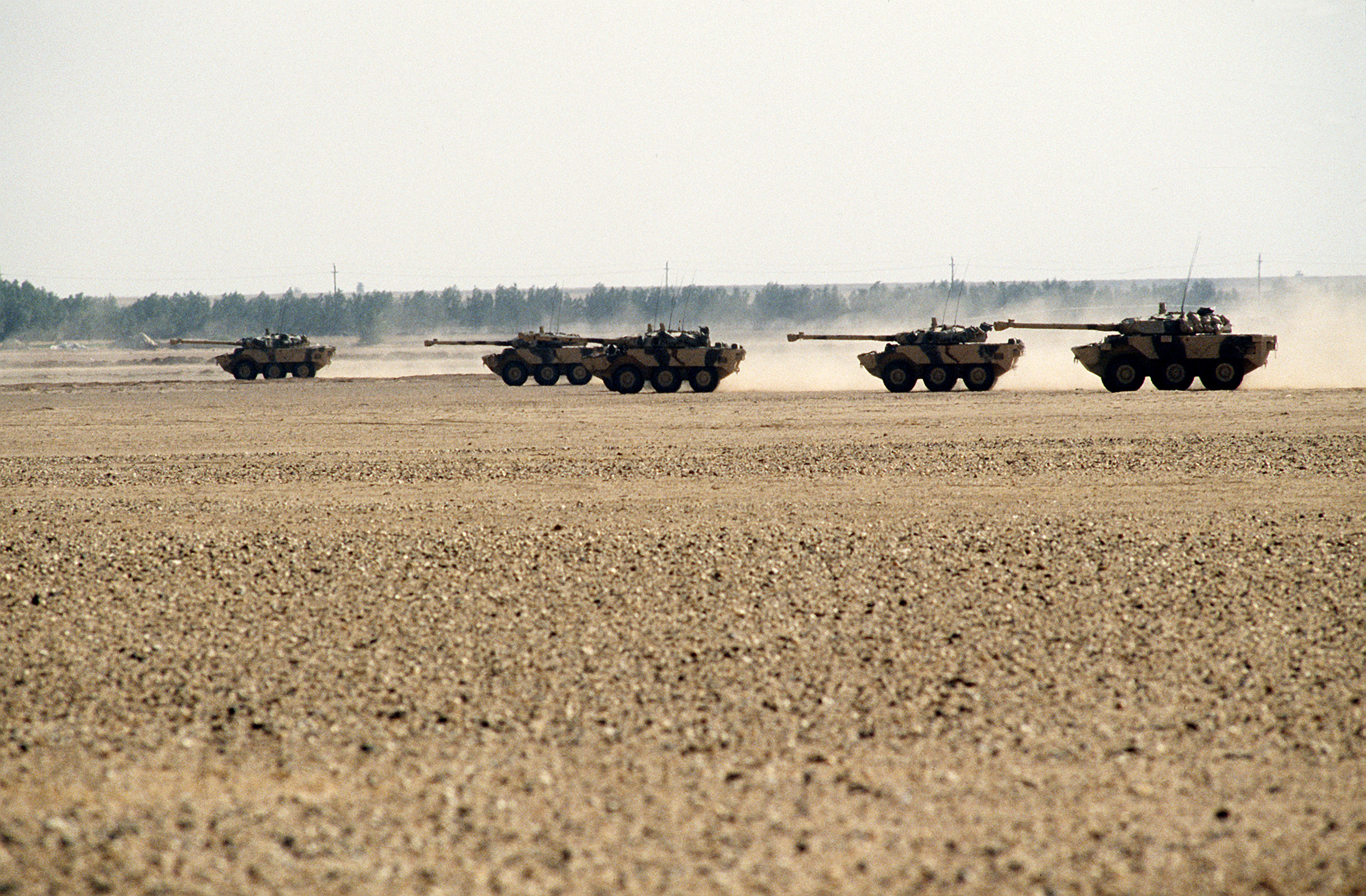
French AMX-10RC during Operation Desert Shield in the Gulf War

While tanks are integral to armoured warfare, when power projection is required, the inability to perform rapid deployment has always been a limit of heavy main battle tanks.

It takes a few weeks to transfer tanks and their supporting equipment by air or sea. Some tanks and armoured vehicles can be dropped by parachute, or carried by cargo airplanes or helicopters. The largest transports can only carry one or two main battle tanks. Smaller transports can only carry or air drop light tanks and APCs such as the M113.

The desire to create air-portable armoured vehicles that can still take on conventional MBTs has usually resulted in ATGM-armed light vehicles or in self-propelled gun style vehicles. The lack of armour protection is offset by the provision of a first-look/first-hit/first-kill capability through the mating of a powerful gun to superior targeting electronics, a concept similar to that of the US tank destroyers of World War II.

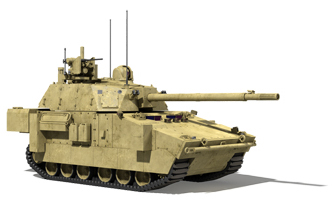
Graphic representation of the U.S. Army's cancelled XM1202 Mounted Combat System

Vehicles which have put such considerations into practice include the Stingray light tank, AMX 10 RC and B1 Centauro. Most such US projects to create such vehicles have been abortive, e.g. the M8 Armored Gun System. The most common was the flawed M551 Sheridan light tank. This was an air-portable tank capable of destroying heavier tanks using the revolutionary (for the time) 152 mm CLGP launcher. The combat effectiveness of this tank was limited by the unreliable MGM-51 missile. The latest iteration of the mobile anti-tank gun platform in American service is the M1134 anti-tank guided missile vehicle, a Stryker variant equipped with TOW missiles; most modern militaries operate comparable vehicles.

Though limited conflicts (such as the insurgency in Iraq) rarely involve direct combat between armoured vehicles, the need to defend against insurgent attacks and IEDs has resulted in the application of armour to light vehicles and the continued use of armoured transports, fighting vehicles and tanks.

== See also ==
- Armoured corps
- Blitzkrieg
- Cold War Tanks
- Combined arms
- Comparison of World War I tanks
- History of the tank
- Light tanks of the United Kingdom
- Lists of armoured fighting vehicles
- Mobile Defence
- Mobile Warfare
- Modern warfare
- Tanks in World War I
- Tanks in World War II
- Tanks of the interwar period
- Tanks of the post–Cold War era

=== Theorists and practitioners ===
- Franks, Tommy
- Fuller, J. F. C.
- de Gaulle, Charles
- Guderian, Heinz
- Hobart, Percy
- Liddell Hart, B. H.
- von Manstein, Erich
- Montgomery, Bernard
- Patton, George Smith
- Rawlinson, Henry
- Rommel, Erwin
- Schwarzkopf, Norman
- Tal, Israel
- Tukhachevski, Mikhail
- Zhukov, Georgy
