= LAV-300 =

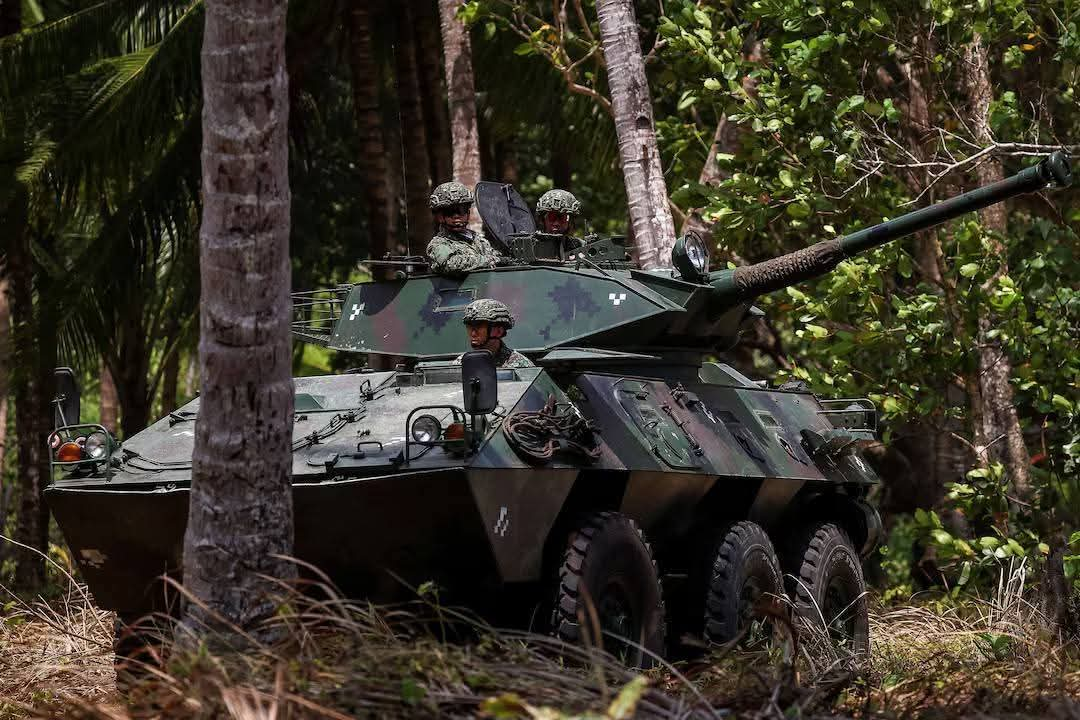
- A Cadillac Gage LAV-300 (Light Armored Vehicle) of the Philippine Marine Corps
- Type: Light Armored Vehicle
- Place of origin: United States

Service history
- In service: 1983 – present
- Used by: See Operators
- Wars: United States invasion of Panama; Invasion of Kuwait; Civil conflict in the Philippines

Production history
- Designed: 1979
- Manufacturer: Cadillac Gage
- Unit cost: $USD562,900 (2003)
- Produced: 1983-1994
- No. built: 103
- Variants: See Variants

Specifications
- Mass: 14,696 kg.
- Length: 6.40 m
- Width: 2.54 m
- Height: 2.7 m (turret roof), 1.98 m (hull top)
- Crew: 3 (Crew) + 9 (Passengers)
- Armor: Protects against 7.62mm ammunition.
- Main armament: 1 x 90 mm, 1 x 7.62 mm Machinegun
- Secondary armament: 2x6 40 mm Smoke Dischargers
- Engine: Cummins 6 CTA 8.3 diesel turbo charged engine 260 bhp
- Power/weight: 18.36 bhp/ton
- Suspension: 6 x 6
- Operational range: 925 km
- Maximum speed: 105 km/h (road), 3 km/h (water)

The Cadillac Gage LAV-300, originally named the V-300, is a family of American light armored vehicles (LAVs) including up to 15 configurations. It was originally created and designed by CG as a private venture project.

As of 2020, the vehicle and its derivatives are no longer being marketed by Textron.

== History ==
The first country to buy it was Panama, which purchased 12 to 13 LAV-300s in APC, Fire Support Vehicle and Armored Recovery variants. Most of them were captured by American forces during Operation Just Cause. In Panama Defense Forces service, they were used by the 5th Infantry Company, the 6th Infantry Company (Mechanized) and Battalion 2000 (Mechanized). 4 LAV-300s were used by the 6th Infantry Company; 9 were used by Battalion 2000. They were deployed during the Battle of Paitilla Airport to block the path of the SEALS deployed to destroy Noriega's private aircraft.

Kuwait placed an order in 1984 for 62 vehicles, some of them in FSV configuration. Most of Kuwait's LAV-300s were destroyed by Iraqi troops during the 1990 Invasion of Kuwait with a few vehicles survived the invasion.

When production of the vehicle was reorganized and placed at New Orleans, its name changed from the V-300 to the LAV-300 in 1994.

The Philippines placed an order in 1993 for 24 LAV-300 MK IIs, 12 in APC configuration and 12 in FSV configuration, which were delivered by 1995. The contract was worth $USD18.243 million. LAV-300s used by the Philippine Marine Corps were designed to be equipped with the .50 BMG/7.62mm NATO turret for the APC and the Cockerill 90mm gun for the FSV.

In a 1994 report by Natick from January to September 1993, the LAV-300 was once considered to be a suitable candidate for the US Army Military Police Armored Security Vehicle program. In 1999, the LAV-300 was considered alongside the LAV-600 to be selected for the US Army's Brigade Combat Team. In the same year, an infantry fighting vehicle version of the LAV-300 MK II was tested at Fort Knox for potential deployment with rapid reaction forces before the Stryker was chosen instead. This proposal was even backed by Captain David L. Nobles in his proposal due to low economical expenses needed to maintain the LAV-300.

Production of the LAV-300 ended in 1994 with marketing discontinued by 2000.

In 2008, Cobb County Police Department has reported the purchase of a LAV-300 for $500,000 with $45,000 to $51,000 paid to refurbish the vehicle for police use. The vehicle was acquired by the CCPD through the 1033 program from Fort Polk, Louisiana.

In 2010, Federal Defense Industries announced that they entered into an agreement with Textron Marine & Land Systems in order to provide authorized aftermarket parts, support and other types of assistance for the LAV-300 since FDI maintains a technical library for spare parts.

In 2011, Napco entered into an agreement with Textron to provide authorized aftermarket parts, support and other types of assistance for the LAV-300.

On 15 September 2016, the Bartonville Police Department showed a LAV-300 with surveillance gear through the 1033 program.

On 5 October 2018, the Philippine Department of National Defense launched a bid to upgrade armored vehicles of the Philippine Navy and Air Force under the Light Armor System Upgrade (LARSU) Acquisition Project with a budget of PHP711,938,000.00. On 28 November 2018, the DND released a bid requirement for a company to modernize the LAV-300s still in working condition with the PMC.

On 10 January 2019, Larsen & Toubro was awarded a contract for $US 14 million for the Armed Forces of the Philippines' Light Armor System Upgrade in replacing worn out engines and other parts. On June 7, 2023, LAV-300s upgraded by Larsen & Toubro were tested in Bulacan.

== Design ==
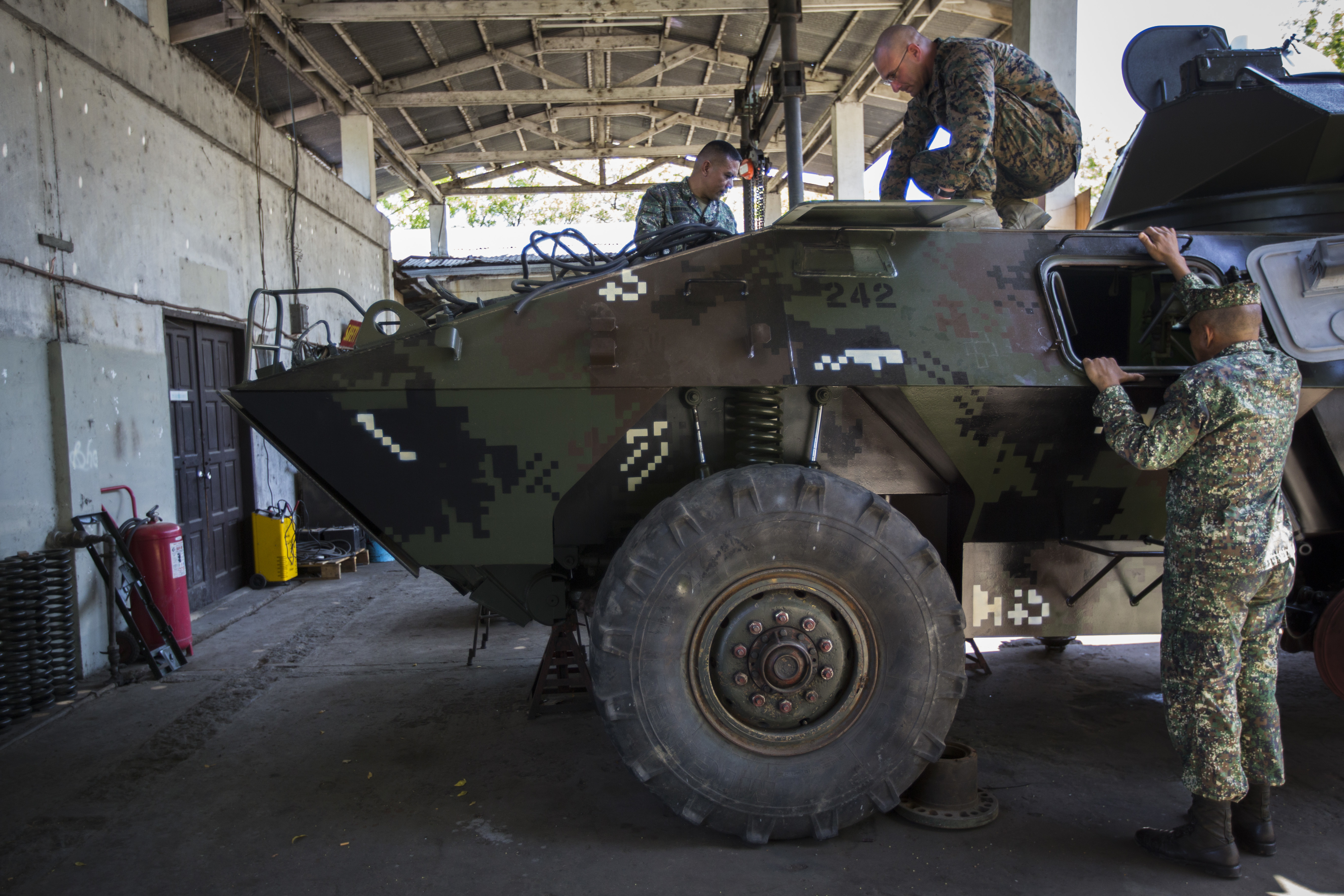
A Marine with the 1st Marine Division works with Filipino marines to examine the LAV-300's interior.

The LAV-300 has a seating capacity for three crewmembers, consisting of a driver, commander and gunner, and nine passengers. Its weight is at 14,696 kg. with a length of 6.40 m and width of 2.54 m. The height is at 2.7 m with a turret and at 1.98 m to the hull. It can go up to 105 km/h under a range of 925 km.

It offers high mobility, speeds of up to 65 mph (105 km/h), and can be air-transported by a C-5 Galaxy, C-141 Starlifter, C-17 Globemaster III and a C-130 Hercules cargo aircraft. Some versions can be air-transported by CH-53E Super Stallion helicopter.

=== Armor ===
The LAV-300's armor is composed of high-hardness Cadloy steel armor employed on a minimum silhouette hull capable of withstanding 7.62 mm caliber bullets at point-blank range from any angle. Additional armor of the vehicle's floor can protect the crew from grenades and landmines. Survivability is further enhanced from low observable technology to minimize levels of thermal, seismic and audio signatures, and minimal radar return.

=== Maneuverability ===
The LAV-300 is amphibious with no need for preparation for fording.

Highly mobile, the LAV-300 MK II is also fully amphibious with no need for preparation for fording and swimming. The tires are radial tubeless and can be outfitted with run-flat inserts and a central tire inflation system for enhanced mobility. It can climb a 60 percent gradient, operate on a 30 percent side slope, and tackle two-foot-high obstacles.

=== Engine ===
The LAV-300 uses a Cummins VT-504 270-hp liquid cooled turbocharged V-8 diesel engine.

The LAV-300 MK II's turbocharged diesel engine allows for acceleration from 0 to 32 km/h in less than 10 seconds. It can use Jet-A fuel, kerosene and other lighter fuels in case of a lack of diesel fuel. The six-wheel, dual hydraulic brakes permit the vehicle to go from 20 miles per hour to 0 in approximately 12 m with its operating range at 925 km. The suspension is composed by a 6x6 wheels (6 driving wheels- 2 wheel steering front axle has solid beam on trailing arms. Rear axles have independent trailing arm with coil springs and 1 shock absorber. It also has a transmission of 6 forward and 2 reverse gears.

=== Equipment ===
The NBC and night vision system are optional equipment made available on end user request. It also has a central tire inflation system equipped.

== Variants ==
The LAV-300 has fifteen different configurations—the most common being: command post, armored personnel carrier, anti-tank, military logistics, ambulance and armored recovery vehicle.

The following turrets are available for the LAV-300:

- 7.62 mm machine gun combined with 12.7 mm, 25 mm, 30 mm or 40 mm guns
- 20 mm anti-aircraft gun
- Missile-based anti-aircraft system
- BGM-71 TOW anti-tank guided missile
- 90 mm gun
- 81 mm and 120 mm mortars.

=== LAV-300 MK II ===
An improved version of the LAV-300, known as the LAV-300 MK II was developed in the 1980s with an aftercool type engine, improved transmission with 6 forward and 2 gear ratio with better tires and a larger fuel tank. An infantry fighting vehicle variant was made as part of the MK II.

=== LAV-300A1 ===
A variant of the LAV-300 equipped with a turret from the Stingray light tank. It was later designated as the LAV-600.

== Operators ==
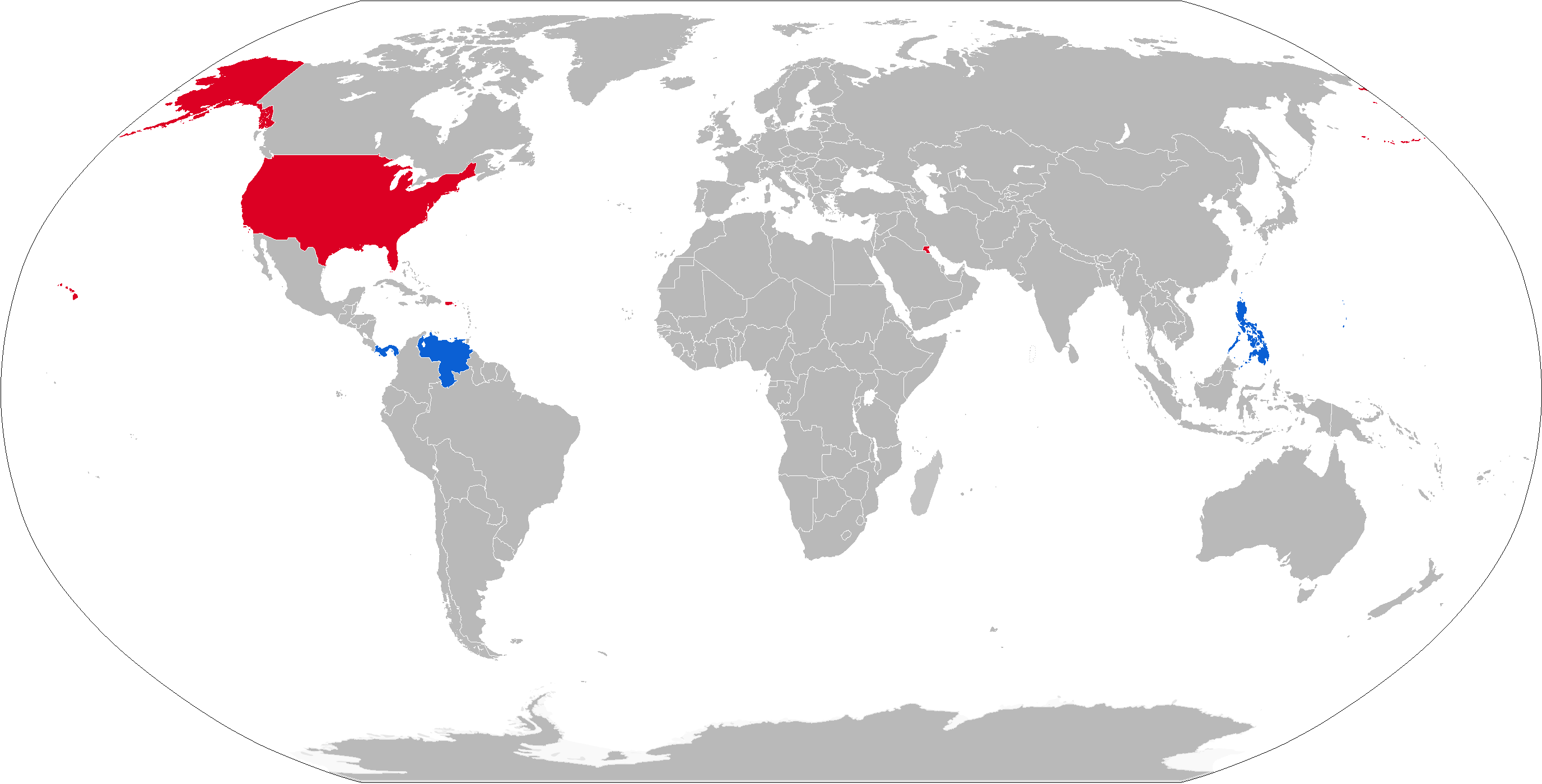
Map with LAV-300 operators in red and former operators in blue

=== Current operators ===
- Philippines: 24 vehicles as of 2015 from the original 36 in 1990. In 2001, Floro International Corporation was contracted to modernize LAV-300s in use by the Philippine Marine Corps. Another upgrade project was announced in 2015 with a contract for PhP34.5 million ($USD784,000 in 2015) to upgrade the LAV-300 FSV's turret systems. Another was launched in 2018 with a bid awarded to Larsen & Toubro to replace worn out components in 2019.
- United States: A used LAV-300 purchased in 2008 and refurbished with thermal sensors, computerized tracking devices (including FLIR), night vision and tear gas launchers with a breaching tool used for dynamic entry methods. It's used by the Cobb County Police Department SWAT team. In 2016, a LAV-300 was refurbished and used by the Bartonville Police Department. Another is used by the Victoria County Sheriff's Office; the vehicle was upgraded by Clegg Industries.

=== Former operators ===
- Iraq: Captured from Kuwait during Gulf War.
- Kuwait: 62 vehicles, destroyed during the Invasion of Kuwait.
- Panama: 12 vehicles. Formerly used by the PDF's 5th Infantry Company, 6th Infantry Company and Battalion 2000.
