= LAV-600 =

- Type: Light Armored Vehicle
- Place of origin: United States

Service history
- In service: None
- Used by: None

Production history
- Designer: Cadillac Gage
- Designed: 1985
- Manufacturer: Textron
- Unit cost: $1,519,000 (2003)
- Produced: 1985–2000
- No. built: 3

Specifications
- Mass: 18,500 kg.
- Length: 6.30 m
- Width: 2.667 m
- Height: 2.74 m
- Crew: 4
- Armor: strengthened steel
- Main armament: 1 × 105 mm, 2 × 7.62 mm Machinegun
- Secondary armament: 8 × 40 mm Smoke Dischargers
- Engine: Cummins 6 CTA 8.3 diesel turbo charged engine 275 bhp
- Power/weight: 14.59 bhp/ton
- Suspension: 6x6
- Operational range: 600 km
- Maximum speed: 100 km/h (road)

The Cadillac Gage LAV-600, also known as the V-600, is an American light armored 6×6 wheeled vehicle, derived from the LAV-300. Developed by Cadillac Gage as a private venture project, the LAV-600 offers superior firepower and mobility to the LAV-300, normally being equipped with a 105mm main gun.

The vehicle was actively being marketed at the time for countries that want to purchase a wheeled fire support vehicle as an alternative to tracked fire support vehicles at a cheaper price.

As of 2020, it is not being marketed by Textron since it was never mass-produced.

== History ==
The LAV-600 was developed as a private venture by Cadillac Gage targeting the export market. The first prototype of the LAV-600 was built in 1985 and development was announced on the same year. It was first known as LAV-300 A1.

Gunnery trials carried out with the 105 mm gun were very successful. These trials included firing the gun at all angles of elevation and firing with the turret traversed 90 degrees to the vehicle's centerline, the results of both being satisfactory. Mobility and firepower trials were carried out in late 1988 in Egypt as a potential customer.

When production of the vehicle was reorganized and placed at New Orleans, its name changed from the V-600 to the LAV-600 in 1994.

In 1989, the LAV-600 was reported to be considered by the US military as a candidate for the Armored Gun System program alongside Teledyne Continental AGS, FMC's CCVL and the IKV 91-105.

In 1999, the LAV-300 was considered alongside the LAV-600 to be selected for the US Army's Brigade Combat Team. The M1117 was chosen instead. Due to this, Textron decided to discontinue marketing in 2000.

In 2010, Federal Defense Industries announced that they entered into an agreement with Textron Marine & Land Systems in order to provide authorized aftermarket parts, support and other types of assistance for the LAV-600 since FDI maintains a technical library for spare parts.

== Design ==
The LAV-600 uses many components of the LAV-300, and also several improved components, including heavier armor, better vision devices and weapons.

The vehicle holds a four-person crew, consisting of a driver, loader, gunner and commander.

Powered by a turbocharged 6CTA 8.3 diesel engine providing a power output of 275 hp (205 kW), the LAV-600 includes an Allison fully automatic transmission with six forward gears. The vehicle can travel at a maximum speed of 100 km/h, and has a range of 600 km. It has a weight of 18,500 kg with a length of 6.30 m, a width of 2.667 m and a height of 2.74 m.

Inclusion of low observable technologies for reconnaissance operations are also supported, such as minimization of infrared signatures, acoustic signatures and seismic signatures. A Halon fire detection and suppression system can be used for the vehicle.

The LAV-600 is designed to allow it to be air-transported using C-130 Hercules aircraft.

=== Armament ===
The complete power operated, low recoil force gun turret of the Stingray light tank is used on the LAV-600. This incorporates a BAE Systems RO Defence 105 mm M-68 gun (L7) as the primary weapon of the LAV-600. A computerized fire control system is used for this weapon, with the power operated winch mounted at the front of the hull. The gunner's sight has an Optic-Electronic M36E1 day/night sight, which can be optionally replaced with the M36E1 SIRE day/night sight incorporating an integral laser rangefinder or an unspecified thermal sight. The turret has a traverse arc of 360 degrees.

As the auxiliary weapon, it is fitted with a FN M240 machine gun. This can be replaced by a 12.7 mm M2 HB machine gun and another mounted on the roof. 16 smoke grenades are carried for Peak Engineering Number 12 smoke grenade launchers mounted on each side of the turret.

=== Protection ===
The hull and turret are of welded cadloy armored steel which provides protection against hits from up to 7.62 mm ammunition and artillery shell splinters. The vehicle's armor can withstand impacts from up to 7.62mm ammunition and offers protection against land mines and fragmentation hand grenades. Armor plates can be fitted on to the hull for additional protection against ballistic impacts.

=== Equipment ===
Optionally, run-flat inserts can be used on the tires with a central tire pressure system.

The LAV-600 features an optional nuclear, biological and chemical (NBC) protection system.

== See also ==
- M1128 mobile gun system – (United States, Canada)
