= Textron Marine & Land Systems =

American military contractor that manufactures armored vehicles

- Company type: Subsidiary
- Industry: Defense
- Predecessor: Cadillac Gage/Textron Marine
- Founded: 1994; 32 years ago
- Headquarters: Slidell, Louisiana, U.S.
- Area served: Worldwide
- Products: Armored Vehicles, Advanced Marine Craft, Surface Effects Ships, and weapons sub systems
- Parent: Textron
- Website: http://www.textronmarineandland.com

Textron Marine & Land Systems, formerly Cadillac Gage, is an American military contractor that manufactures armored vehicles, turrets, advanced marine craft, surface effect ships, and other weapon systems. It is owned by Textron, and was formed in the merger between Cadillac Gage and Textron Marine in 1994.

== History ==
Cadillac Gage, located in Warren, Michigan manufactured many Vietnam War-era military vehicles and artillery pieces: Stoner 63 modular weapon system (1963-1971), Cadillac Gage V-100 Commando Armored Personnel Carrier, (Note: V-100, V-150, V-200, LAV-300 light armored vehicle, LAV-600 light armored vehicle, Commando Scout.) Cadillac Gage Ranger/Peacekeeper Armored Personnel Carrier, (Note: Based on Dodge Ram/Dodge D Series chassis.) Stingray light tank, Stingray 2.

The 2003 invasion of Iraq gave a boost to Textron’s operations. From 2005 to 2010, the manpower of its manufacturing plant on Chef Menteur Highway in eastern New Orleans doubled, reaching 1,000 people.

In August 2005, the company's manufacturing units were severely damaged by Hurricane Katrina.

On March 31, 2015, Textron signed a contract with US Navy worth $84 million to build two new Landing Craft Air Cushion vehicles, LCACs 102 and 103. The craft are part of the Ship to Shore Connector (SSC) program, developed to replace the existing fleet of LCACs.

In 2020, the US Army awarded the company with the development of battlefield unmanned combat vehicles and additional high-speed ship-to-shore air-cushioned hovercraft.

== Activities ==
The main office for Textron Marine & Land Systems is located in Slidell, Louisiana. The company produces:

- M1117 armored security vehicle for the U.S. Army
- Textron Tactical Armoured Patrol Vehicle for the Canadian Army
- Landing Craft Air Cushion (LCAC) for the U.S. Navy
- Ship-to-Shore Connector
- 47-foot Motor Lifeboat (MLB) for the U.S. Coast Guard
- NAIAD Rigid Hull Inflatable Boat
- Cadillac Gage turret systems
- Tiger Light Protected Vehicle
