= Cadillac Gage Commando Scout =

- Type: Scout car
- Place of origin: United States

Service history
- In service: 1982–present
- Used by: See Operators

Production history
- Manufacturer: Cadillac Gage
- Produced: 1977–1987
- No. built: 140
- Variants: See Variants

Specifications
- Mass: 7.24 tonnes (7.98 short tons; 7.13 long tons)
- Length: 5.003 m (16 ft 5.0 in)
- Width: 2.057 m (6 ft 9.0 in)
- Height: 2.159 m (7 ft 1.0 in)
- Crew: 2-3
- Armor: Cadloy welded steel
- Main armament: 1 × 20 mm autocannon, 1 × 12.7 mm or 7.62 mm machine gun; 1 × 12.7 mm machine gun, 1 × 40 mm grenade launcher; 1 × BGM-71 TOW launcher, 1 × 7.62 mm machine gun; 1 × 106 mm M40 recoilless rifle
- Engine: V6 turbocharged diesel engine 155 hp (115 kW)
- Power/weight: 20.58 hp/tonne
- Transmission: Allison 4-speed automatic
- Suspension: Wheeled 4x4, Trailing arm
- Ground clearance: 290 mm (11 in)
- Fuel capacity: 378 L (83 imp gal; 100 US gal)
- Operational range: 846 km (526 mi)
- Maximum speed: 88 km/h (55 mph)

The Cadillac Gage Scout was an American scout car designed for the export market that was first announced in October 1977 at the Association of the United States Army meeting in Washington D.C.

== History ==
In 1983, Indonesia placed an order for 28 Scout vehicles.

In August 1986, Egypt placed a US$22.8 million contract with Cadillac Gage for 112 Scout reconnaissance vehicles, with half the vehicles delivered in 1986 and the remainder in 1987.

By early 1999, a total of 140 Scout (4 x 4) vehicles had been built by Cadillac Gage.

In 2010, Federal Defense Industries announced that they entered into an agreement with Textron Marine & Land Systems in order to provide authorized aftermarket parts, support and other types of assistance for the Scout since FDI maintains a technical library for spare parts.

In 2011, Napco entered into an agreement with Textron to provide authorized aftermarket parts, support and other types of assistance for the Scout.

== Description ==
The welded hull of the Scout is made of special hardness Cadloy armour plate which will defeat at a minimum 7.62 mm armour-piercing rounds. The front, sides and rear of the hull are well sloped to afford maximum protection within the weight of the vehicle.

The front of the Scout is sloped at an angle of 76° from the top of the driver's hatch to the nose. In addition to providing ballistic protection it allows the vehicle to push its way through underbrush.

The driver is seated on the left side of the hull with the engine to his right and is provided with an adjustable seat and a single-piece hatch cover that slides to the front of the vehicle when he is driving with his head out. Driver vision is provided by three periscopes mounted forward of the hatch area.

The fuel tank is at the front of the hull between the wheels. The engine is coupled to an Allison Transmission four-speed automatic transmission via a Cadillac Gage power transfer unit. The complete power pack, consisting of the engine, transfer unit, transmission and cooling system, can be removed and replaced in two hours. Access to the engine is by a large hatch in the right side of the hull through which all fluid levels (coolant, lubricant, brake fluids and so on) can be checked.

The turret or pod is at the rear of the vehicle and access is by a two-part hatch in the rear of the hull with the bottom part folding downwards and the top part opening to the right.

The front suspension features coil springs over a solid axle with trailing arms. The split rear axle is tied to a heavy-duty coil spring suspension. Cone-shaped passages in the rear of the hull allow for high individual vertical roadwheel travel. Both axles are fitted with positive locking differentials which provide improved traction by preventing one wheel spin-out.

The integral hydraulic power steering is powered by a gear-driven pump working directly off the engine. This approach has eliminated the requirement for belt drives which slip or break and steering cylinders that require maintenance.

The independent front and rear brake systems function through a split master cylinder and a back-up system supports them in the event of an engine failure. The back-up system consists of an electric motor which supplies pressure to the master cylinder. The tyres are of the run-flat type. Standard equipment includes two hand-held fire extinguishers stowed inside the vehicle, a pioneer toolset, a breaker bar and lug wrench, a first aid kit, a vehicle toolkit, and an air compressor with a 15.24 m hose.

The Scout is not fitted with an NBC system, has no night vision equipment and is not amphibious. Optional equipment includes a siren/public address system, radio installations, weapon stowage, water and fuel cans, a slave cable, a 15.24 m auxiliary cable, a camouflage net, a smoke grenade system and a fragmentation grenade system.

== Variants ==
The following variants were marketed by CG when the Scout was being produced:

- Command Pod Scout
- TOW Missile Scout
- 106mm Recoilless Rifle
- Twin 1m Turret
- 20mm Turret
- 40mm and 12.7 Turret

== Operators ==
- Egypt: 112 Scouts
- Indonesia: 28 Scouts
