= Stingray light tank =

Light tank used by the Thai army

Stingray
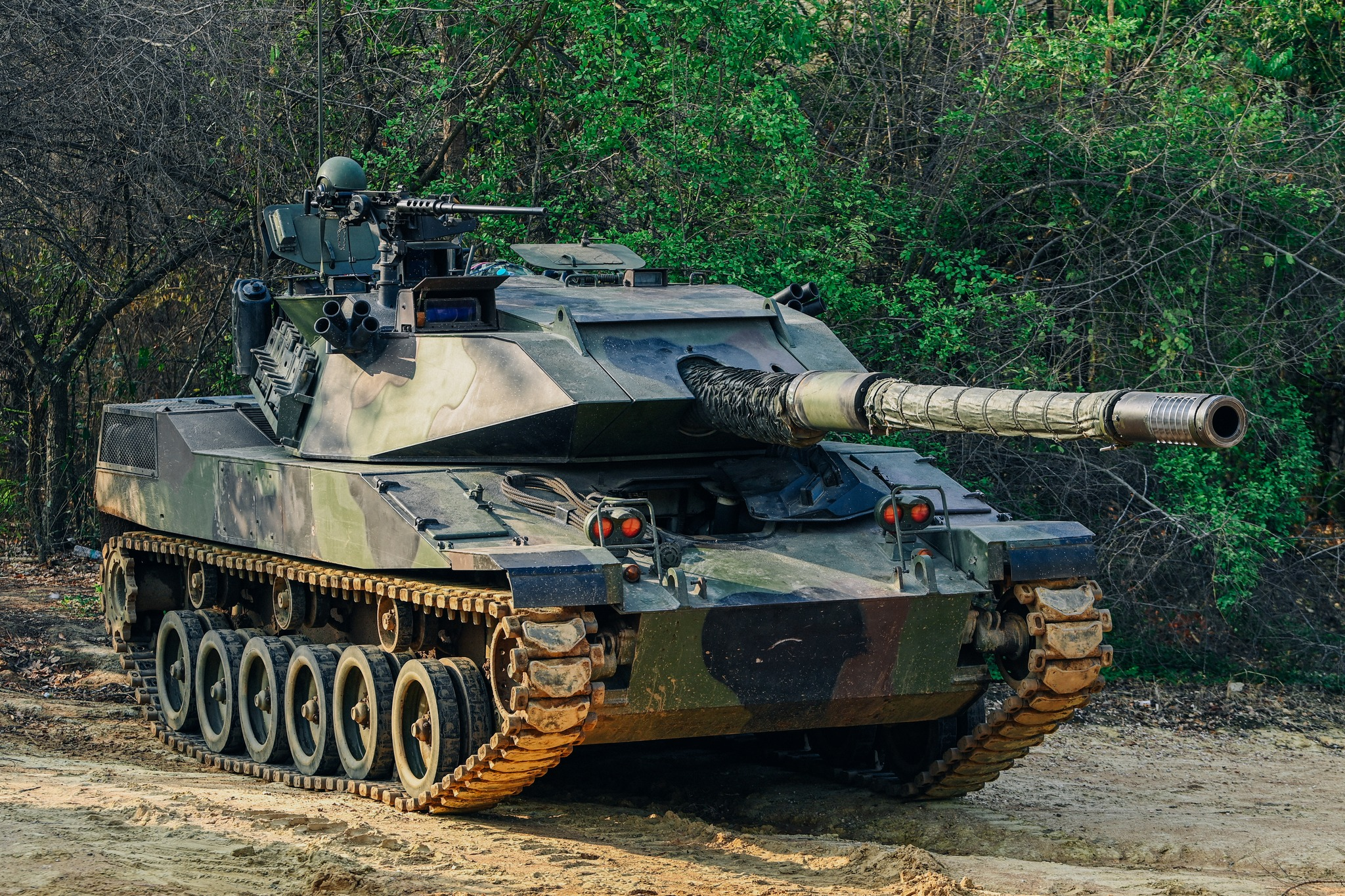
- A Stingray tank
- Type: Light tank
- Place of origin: United States

Service history
- In service: 1989–present
- Used by: Thailand
- Wars: 2025 Cambodian–Thai border conflict

Production history
- Manufacturer: Cadillac Gage
- No. built: 106

Specifications
- Mass: 22.6 tonnes
- Length: 9.3 m (30 ft 6 in) with gun forward
- Width: 3 m (9 ft 10 in)
- Height: 2.7 m (8 ft 10 in)
- Crew: 4 (commander, driver, gunner, radio operator/loader)
- Main armament: L7 LRF 105 mm rifled tank gun
- Secondary armament: 7.62 mm co-axial machine gun, 12.7 mm M2 Browning heavy machine gun
- Engine: Detroit Diesel Allison 8V-92TA, liquid cooled turbo charged 2-stroke V-8 diesel engine 535 hp (399 kW) at 2300 rpm
- Transmission: SNT Dynamics/Allison Transmission XTG411-2A; 4 forward, 2 reverse
- Suspension: Independent trailing arm torsion bar
- Operational range: 300 miles (480 km)
- Maximum speed: 70 km/h (43 mph)

The Stingray, sometimes known as the Commando Stingray, is a light tank produced by Textron Marine & Land Systems division (formerly Cadillac Gage). The Stingray was a private venture project aimed at foreign countries. As of 2020, Textron has kept the Stingray name registered.

It was exported for use by armed forces of Thailand, who remain the only user.

== History ==
The Stingray was developed in the 1980s as a private venture by Cadillac Gage Textron. It was primarily developed for the export market. Cadillac Gage Textron began design work in 1983. The hull and turret were finished separately in 1984. The turret was first mated to the American M551 Sheridan hull for trials. The first prototype was completed in 1985, and debuted in public later that year. A second prototype was produced in 1986. The first prototype was sent to Thailand in 1986, then Malaysia in 1987. The Stingray was evaluated in Ecuador in 1988, and Chile in 1992.

In 1987, the Royal Thai Army purchased 106 Stingrays from Cadillac Gage for US$150 million. These were delivered from 1989 to 1990. Cadillac Gage provided assistance in repairing Stingrays with cracked structural components. In February 1993, an investigation was carried out by the Royal Thai Army due to allegations of irregularities, which Cadillac Gage denied after 44 out of 106 tanks were reported to have cracks in their armor.

In 1992, the U.S. Army solicited bids for a replacement for the M551 Sheridan under the Armored Gun System program. Cadillac Gage submitted a Stingray design, which was too heavy for the U.S. Army's requirements. Cadillac Gage continued its work with the Stingray II. One prototype was completed in 1994, and the tank was marketed to Malaysia, Saudi Arabia, and Taiwan up until 2003.

In 2010, Federal Defense Industries announced that they entered into an agreement with Textron Marine & Land Systems in order to provide authorized aftermarket parts, support and other types of assistance for the Stingray since FDI maintains a technical library for spare parts.

In 2011, Napco entered into an agreement with Textron to provide authorized aftermarket parts, support and other types of assistance for the Stingray.

== Design ==
=== Main armament ===
The main armament is the low recoil force variant of the 105 mm Royal Ordnance L7 gun. The tank's ammunition capacity has been variously reported as:

- 32 rounds, with eight rounds stowed in the turret, and three of these ready.
- 36 rounds, with eight rounds ready.
- 44 rounds, with eight rounds stowed in the turret, and three of these ready.

== Variants ==
=== Stingray ===
The Stingray has a 105 mm rifled cannon. Its cruise speed is 44 mph (71 km/h). Maximum grade is 60%. The maximum vertical distance it can scale is 2.7 feet (82 cm). It can ford water up to 3.5 feet (107 cm). It is air transportable in a C-130 cargo aircraft. The original Stingray program was launched in 1983, with the first prototype vehicle ready in August 1984. The Stingray turret was also marketed separately for retrofit installation on the hull of the M41, M47 or M551 tank or on the V600 armored car. Its armor was made from CG's Cadaloy armor.

The Stingray can be upgraded with the CG Fire Control and Stabilization Upgrade Kit as an affordable solution to upgrade its fire control systems.

=== Armored Gun System ===
Stingray AGS proposal

In 1992, the U.S. Army solicited bids for a successor to the M551 Sheridan light tank under the Armored Gun System competition. Cadillac Gage Textron submitted a lengthened hull Commando Stingray with the U.S. Marine Corps LAV-105 turret. This had a crew of three (the fourth crewmember was replaced by an Fairey Hydraulics automatic ammunition loader). The AGS Stingray carried 30 rounds, with 16 in ready storage. This was armed with an XM35 105 mm gun, though an earlier proposed model mounted a Royal Ordnance L7 105 mm Low Recoil Force cannon. Propulsion was provided by a Detroit Diesel 6V92 DDEC TA engine developing 550 hp (410 kW) at 2300 rpm with a General Electric HMPT-500-3 transmission. Cadloy steel armor protected the vehicle from 14.5 mm machine gun fire over the frontal arc in its base configuration. Cadillac Gage lost out to the FMC Close Combat Vehicle Light.

=== Stingray II ===
The Stingray II is an upgrade version of the Stingray, developed by Cadillac Gage as a private-venture armored fighting vehicle (AFV) for the export market. The turret is the same that is mounted on the Cadillac-Gage V-600. The light tank's baseline armor protects its occupants from armor-piercing, heavy machine gun rounds up to 14.5 mm in size. Additional armor appliqué can be fitted to increase ballistic protection. Operational range is increased 450 kilometres (280 mi) if one assumes a travel speed of about 48 kilometres per hour (30 mph). The 8V-92TA engine on the Stingray II has been uprated to 550 hp (410 kW) at 2,300 rpm, and a 650 hp (480 kW) version is also available.

The Stingray's main armament is a low recoil force (LRF) version of the British Royal Ordnance L7 105 mm rifled gun installed in a well-angled and electro-hydraulically powered turret having manual backup as is usually found on tanks. The gun has optional stabilization in two axes, and eight ready rounds, with another 24 rounds stored in the hull. Complementing the main gun is an M240 7.62 mm co-axial machine gun with 2,400 rounds (400 ready), as well as a 12.7 mm M2 Browning anti-aircraft machine gun with 1,100 rounds on the commander's hatch (100 ready). The Stingray II is fitted with 16 protective smoke grenade launch tubes, with 8 of them on each side. The optic system for the gunner is composed of a stabilized Hughes HIRE day/thermal night sight together with a laser rangefinder.

The main improvements offered in the Stingray II are a more capable digital fire-control system (from the M1A1 Abrams). The Stingray II also improves the armor to provide protection from 23 mm rounds over the frontal arc and side skirts. An appliqué armour kit can be applied in the field in two to four hours. This involves installing a wider track.

Two Stingray IIs were made to showcase its weapons and equipment for demonstration to potential customers.

== Users ==
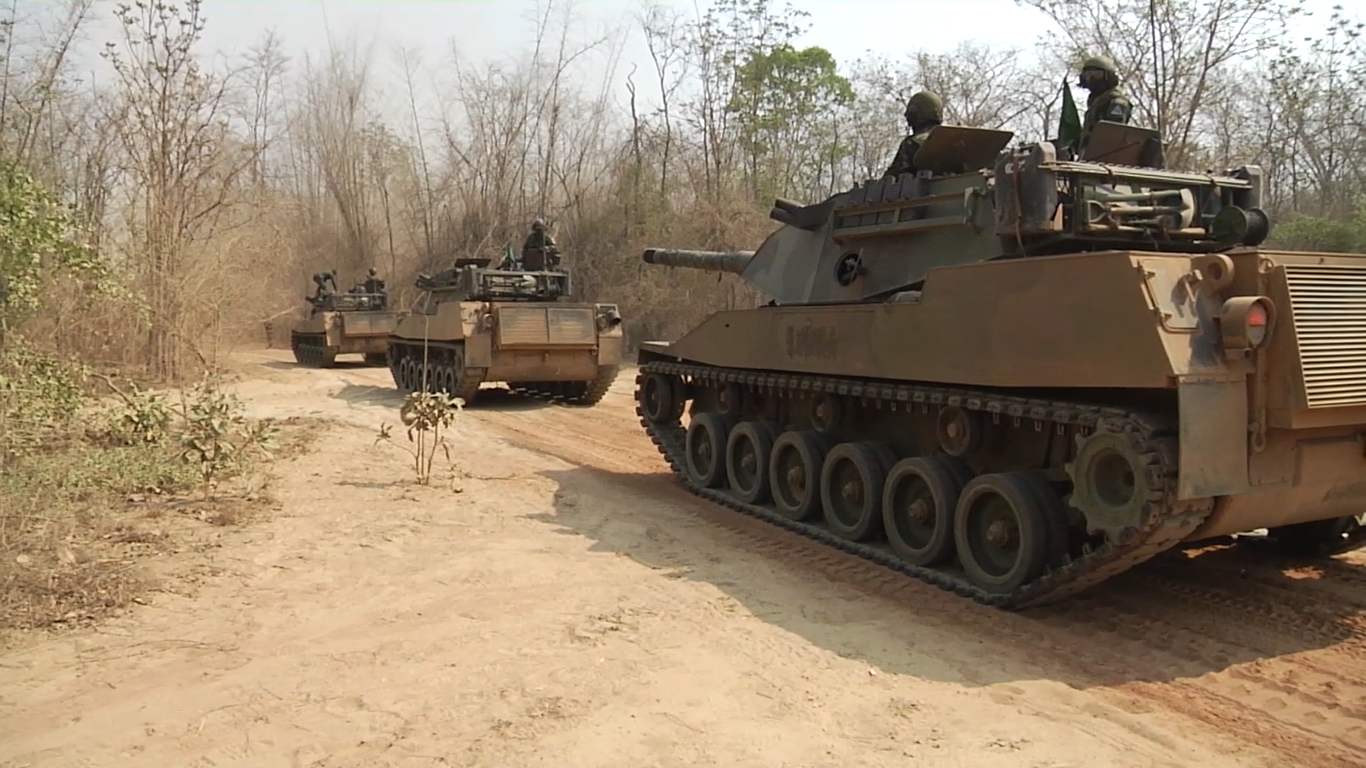
3 Thai Stingray, 2019.

Current users

- Thailand: Royal Thai Army, 106 Stingrays were delivered through 1990.

Prospective bids/States that previously expressed interest

- Thailand: Royal Thai Marine Corps had expressed interest in acquiring 15 units, however another system was chosen in 2000.
- Malaysia: Expressed interest in the Commando Stingray
- Saudi Arabia: Expressed interest in the Commando Stingray
- Republic of China: Expressed interest in both the Commando Stingray and Stingray II
- United States: Cadillac Gage entered a variant of the Commando Stingray with a LAV-105 turret in a competition to replace the M551 Sheridan. This was not selected.

== See also ==
- TH 301 (TAM) – (Argentina)

== Bibliography ==
- Hunnicutt, R. P. (2015a) [1995]. Sheridan: A History of the American Light Tank. Vol. 2. Battleboro, VT: Echo Point Books & Media. ISBN 978-1-62654-154-2.
