= PLZ-07 =

PLZ-07 Self-Propelled Howitzer
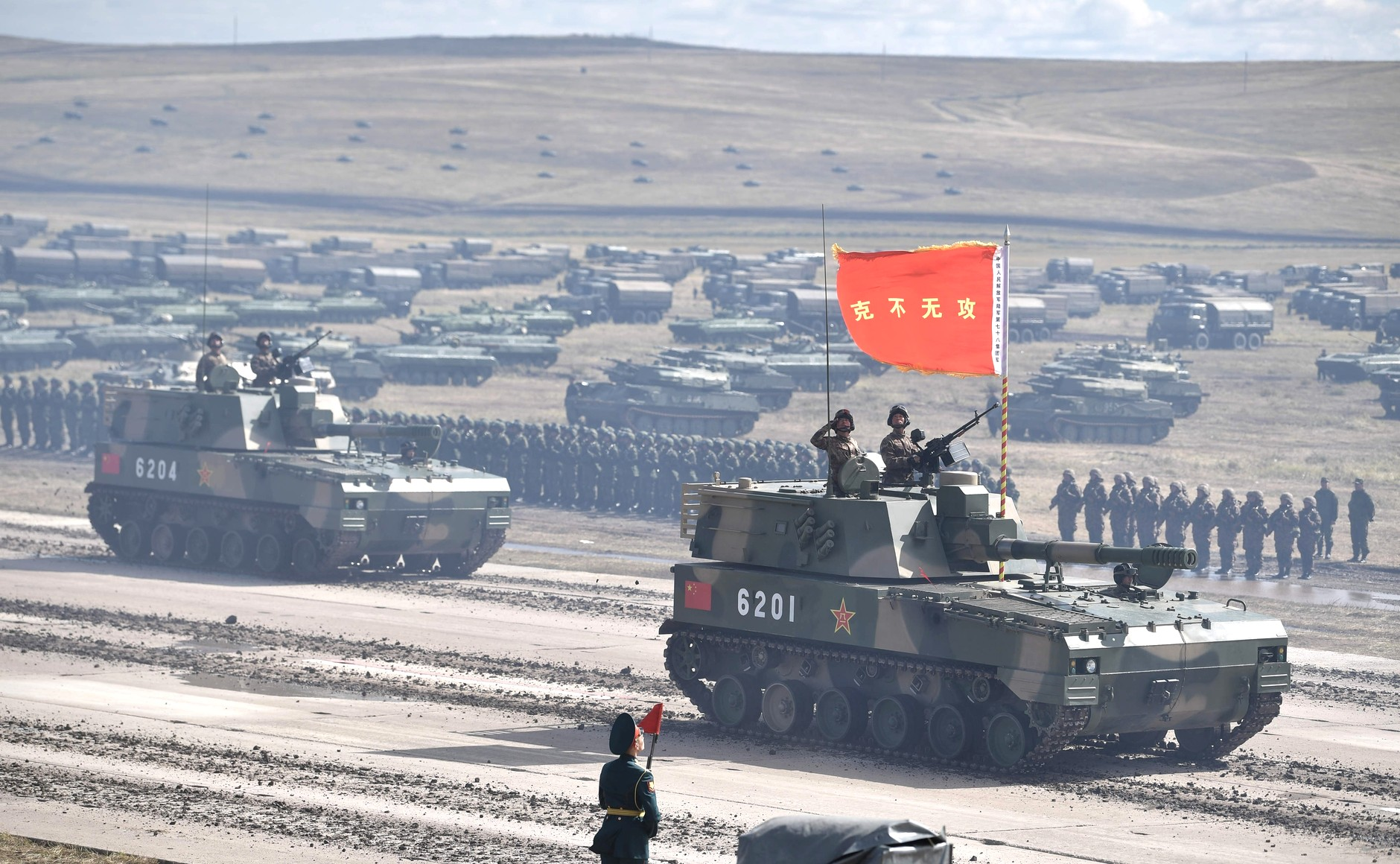
- PLZ-07 Self-propelled artillery during Vostok 2018
- Type: Self-propelled artillery
- Place of origin: China

Specifications
- Mass: 24.5 tons
- Length: 6.6 m
- Width: 3.28 m
- Height: 2.5 m
- Crew: 5
- Caliber: 122 mm
- Traverse: 360°
- Maximum firing range: Standard: 18 km Base bleed: 22 km Rocket assisted: 27 km
- Main armament: 122 mm howitzer
- Secondary armament: 12.7 mm anti-aircraft machine gun
- Engine: diesel 600 hp
- Suspension: torsion bar
- Operational range: 500 km
- Maximum speed: 65 km/h

The PLZ-07 or Type 07 is a Chinese 122 mm self-propelled artillery made by the China North Industries Group Corporation (NORINCO). The PLZ-07 self-propelled howitzer was first unveiled to the public during the military parade celebrating 60th anniversary of the PLA on 1 October 2009. The PLZ-07 was developed to replace the older Type 89, Type 85 and Type 70/70-1 122 mm self-propelled artillery systems.

== Design and development ==
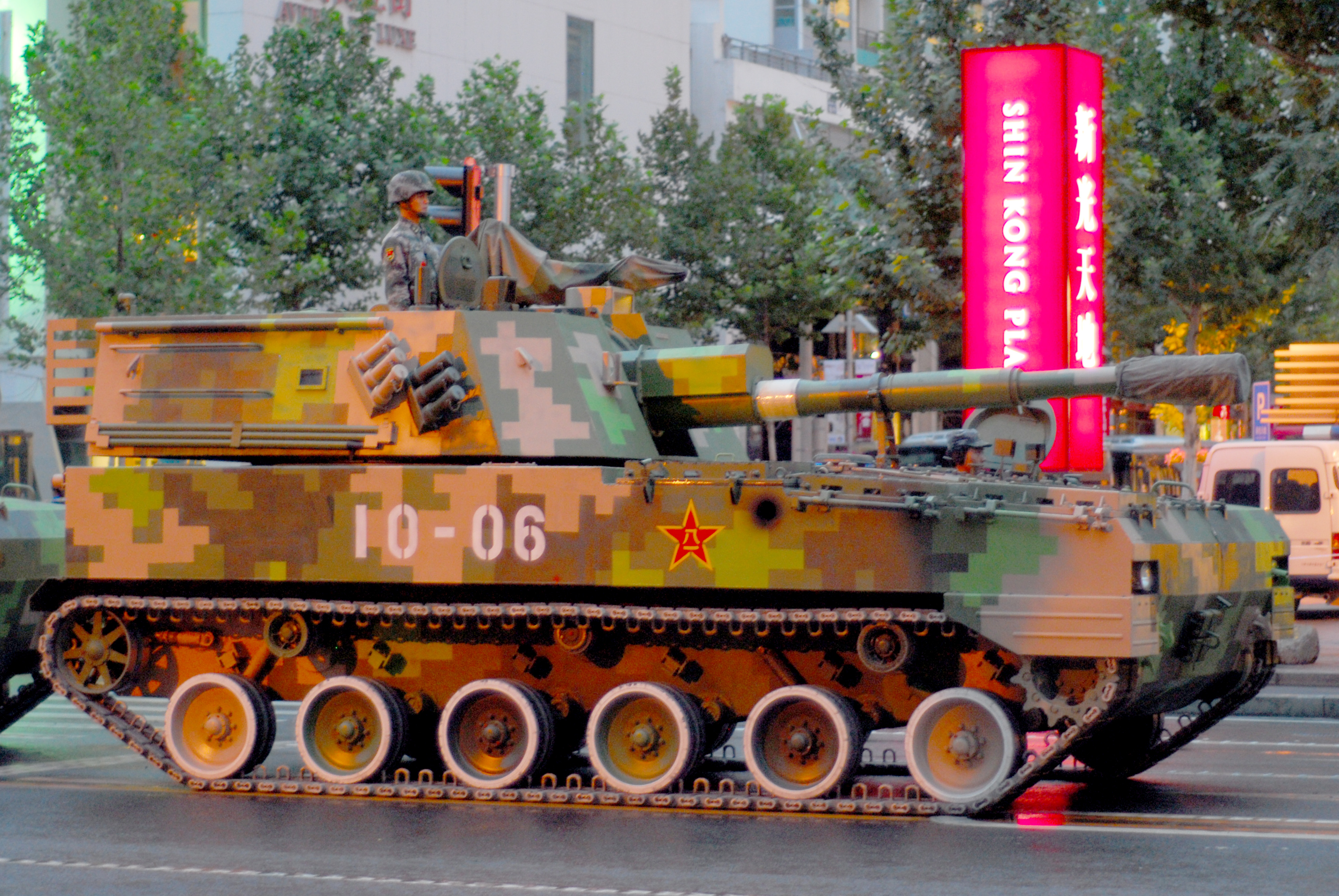
PLZ-07 seen at Beijing Military Parade in 2009

The PLZ-07 largely retained the design language of PLZ-89, the previous self-propelled howitzer developed by Norinco. The new chassis for the PLZ-07 self-propelled artillery is developed from ZBD-04 infantry fighting vehicles, featuring improved armor protection, fire suppression system, and NBC protection. The vehicle is 6.66 m long, 3.28 m wide and 2.5 m high to the turret roof. It carries a crew of five and its 440 kW (600 hp) diesel engine gives it a top road speed of 65 km/h and a maximum road range of 500 km.

The PLZ07 122 mm tracked self-propelled gun mounts a PL-96 122 mm/L32 howitzer. The design of the PL-96 could be based on Soviet D30 howitzer. The vehicle weighs 22.5 tons fully loaded and carries 40 rounds of ammunition. The gun has a maximum range of 18 km with normal ammunition, 22 km with base bleed and 27 km with rocket-assisted rounds. The gun has an elevation from 0° to +70° and a maximum rate of fire of 6–8 rounds per minute. In addition to the 122 mm howitzer, the QJC-88 12.7 mm × 108 mm heavy machine gun is mounted on the turret roof, and there are two triple banks of 76 mm smoke grenade dischargers on either side of the turret.

The PLZ-07 is land based while the PLZ-07B is the amphibious variant that shares a common design with modification derived from the ZBD-05.

== Variants ==
PLZ-07
Land based variant.
PLZ-07B
amphibious variant with unique dedicated-designed amphibious chassis. Although this vehicle is part of the PLZ-07 series, the vehicle hull shares design elements from ZBD-05 amphibious fighting vehicle

== Operators ==
China

- People's Liberation Army Ground Force – 700 units as of 2021. 550 units of PLZ-07A; 150 units of PLZ-07B.
- People's Liberation Army Navy Marine Corps – 150 units of PLZ-07B in 2022.

== See also ==
- List of equipment of the People's Liberation Army Ground Force

Related development

- Type 70 SPH – 122 mm self-propelled howitzer developed by China in 1960s.
- Type 85 SPH – 122 mm self-propelled howitzer developed by China in 1980s.
- PLZ-89 – previous generation of self-propelled howitzer system developed by China.

Comparable ground systems

- 2S1 Gvozdika
