= PLZ-89 =

Chinese 122 mm self-propelled howitzer

- Type: Self-propelled howitzer
- Place of origin: China

Service history
- Used by: See § Operators

Specifications
- Mass: 20 t (20 long tons; 22 short tons)
- Length: 11 m (36 ft)
- Width: 3.4 m (11 ft)
- Height: 2 m (6 ft 7 in)
- Crew: 5
- Calibre: 122 mm (4.8 in)
- Traverse: 360°
- Rate of fire: 6–8 rounds/min
- Maximum firing range: 18 km (11 mi) for standard high-explosive 21 km (13 mi) for ERFB-BB
- Main armament: 122 mm howitzer
- Secondary armament: 12.7 mm anti-aircraft machine gun/2 sets of 4-barrel grenade launchers
- Engine: 12V150L12 liquid-cooled diesel 450 hp (340 kW)
- Suspension: Torsion bar
- Operational range: 500 km (310 mi)
- Maximum speed: 60 km/h (37 mph)

The Type 89 self-propelled howitzer (military designation PLZ-89) is a 122 mm self-propelled howitzer used by China's People's Liberation Army to replace Type 85 and Type 70 122 mm self-propelled howitzer. The PLZ-89 was first unveiled to the public during the 1999 Chinese National Day Parade.

== Development ==
Since the late 1970s, a number of 122 mm self-propelled howitzers (SPH) had been developed in China to meet Chinese army requirements. The People's Liberation Army (PLA) required a mobile artillery system to provide medium- to long-range indirect fire support for motorised infantry and armoured troops and capable of keeping pace with them. However, none of them could meet these requirements. The Type 89 self-propelled howitzer, also known as the PLZ-89, was developed in the late 1980s. It was a Chinese attempt to develop an indigenous SPH with similar capabilities to the Soviet 2S1 Gvozdika. The Type 89 is currently in service with the PLA and PLA Navy Marine Corps. Several hundred of these artillery systems were built.

== Design ==
The Type 89 SPH is armed with a 122 mm/L32 howitzer. The main armament is derived from the Type 86 (W-86) 122 mm/32-caliber towed howitzer, which itself is a Chinese licensed copy of the Soviet D-30 122 mm howitzer. The PLZ-89 carries 40 rounds inside the turret. The gun is equipped with semi-automatic loader with a maximum rate of fire of 6–8 rounds/min and fire accuracy is achieved by a digital fire-control system and a roof-mounted electro-optical sighting for day/night operations. This artillery system is compatible with Chinese and Russian 122 mm ammunition. Its maximum range of fire is 18 km (11 mi) using standard HE projectiles and 21 km (13 mi) with extended-range projectiles. The vehicle is fitted with a computerised fire-control system, night vision.

The secondary armament consists of a roof-mounted QJC-88 12.7 mm machine gun. For the safety of its crew of five, the vehicle is armoured against small-arms fire and artillery shell splinters, and fitted with NBC protection, fire detection and automatic fire suppression systems. Its tracked chassis, developed from the Type 77 amphibious armoured personnel carrier, is powered by a 450 hp (340 kW) 12V150L12 diesel engine. The Type 89 can also be fitted with a flotation kit for amphibious warfare.

== Variants ==
PLZ-89
Baseline military version.
SH-3
Export-oriented variant featuring an improved chassis, new engine, new transmission.

== Operators ==
China

- People's Liberation Army Ground Force – 500 PLZ-89

Rwanda

- Rwanda Defence Force – 6 SH-3

== See also ==
- List of equipment of the People's Liberation Army Ground Force
- PLZ-07 – the successor of PLZ-89
