= Type 77 =

Type 77 can refer to:

- Type 77 armored personnel carrier, an armored personnel carrier developed by China.
- Type 77 pistol, a Chinese pistol.
- Type 77 hand grenade, a Chinese fragmentation grenade.
- Type 77 heavy machine gun, a Chinese 12.7×108mm heavy machine gun featuring an indigenous design
- Type 77 submachine gun, a Taiwanese (Republic of China) submachine gun
- Type 77 Fighter Aircraft, Indian designation for the MiG-21FL, a mid-1960s export variant of the MiG-21.
