= Type 90 AFV =

Type 90 (YW535)
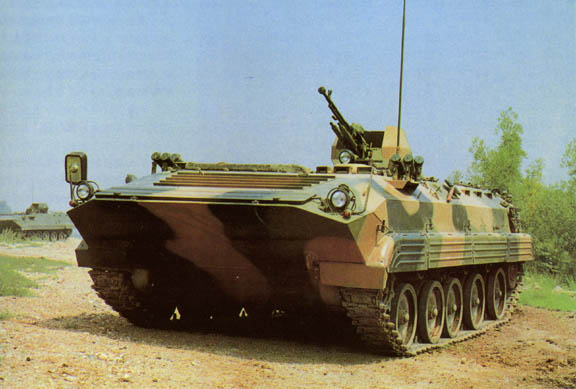
- Type: Armoured personnel carrier
- Place of origin: China

Production history
- Designed: late 1980s
- Manufacturer: Norinco
- Produced: 1991

Specifications
- Mass: 14.5 tonne
- Length: 6.744 m
- Width: 3.148 m
- Height: 2.376 m
- Crew: 2 (commander and driver) and 13 passengers
- Armor: Welded steel hull, resist rounds up to 12.7mm
- Main armament: 1x Type 54 12.7mm anti-aircraft machine gun
- Engine: Deutz/KHD BF8L 413F 4-cycle air-cooled diesel 235 kW (320 hp)
- Power/weight: 16.21 kW/t
- Suspension: torsion bar
- Operational range: 500 km
- Maximum speed: 65 km/h

The Type 90 is an armoured fighting vehicle produced by Chinese company Norinco; it is the successor for the Type 85 AFV of which it uses some components. The Type 90 series was developed for export, and consists of at least ten different types; its industrial index is YW535.

This new type is rather similar to its predecessors Type 85 AFV and Type 89 AFV, but the hull has a different shape, having a vertical lower side wall and a sloping upper side wall. Overall, the Type 90 is bigger and heavier, yet has a lower profile.

== Description ==
The hull is made of all-welded homogeneous armour plate, and provides protection against small arms fire. The vehicle carries a maximum of 15 including crew. The driver sits in the front left of the hull, and has a single piece hatch, which opens to the left. The driver is provided with three day periscopes. One of them can be replaced by a passive low-light-level night vision device or infrared sight. The commander sits behind the driver and has a single piece hatch.

The air-cooled, turbocharged diesel engine sits to the right rear of the driver. The engine is usually the BF8L 413F of 320 hp, but some models (Type 91) are powered by a more powerful 360 hp engine BF8L 513C. A large intake is located in the top of the hull, with an exhaust on the right hand side. The engine feeds a new hydraulic gearbox with 4 forward gears and 1 reverse gear. The track is driven at the front by a drive sprocket, and passes over five dual rubber-tyred road wheels and three track-return rollers, then loops over an idler at the rear, before returning to the front again.

A 12.7 millimetre calibre machine gun with armoured shields is located in an open mount at the front of a small hatch in the center of the hull which opens into the troop compartment. The gun can traverse through 360 degrees and can be elevated to an angle of 90 degrees. A total of 1,050 rounds is carried on board. The troop compartment is at the rear of the hull with the infantrymen entering via a large door hinged on the right. Over the top of the troop compartment is a total of four hatches, two small ones located towards the front and two oblong ones to the rear; the latter open outwards. In each side of the hull there are three firing ports with periscopes. On either side of the forward hull, a cluster of four 76 mm smoke grenade dischargers is mounted.

The vehicle is fully amphibious, a folding trim board stowed at the front of the hull needs to be raised, and the vehicle can then propel itself in the water using its tracks. Standard equipment includes an NBC system, a Type 889 radio, and a Type 803 intercom system.

== Variants ==
- Type 90 Tracked Armoured Personnel Carrier - Basic version, as described.
- Type 90 Armoured Command Vehicle - Retains the basic low-profile hull, but has some of the periscopes removed. Specialised equipment consists of a generator and additional radio sets.
- Type 90 Armoured Command Post - Has a higher roofline and is equipped with a generator and multiple radio sets.
- Type 90 Tracked Armoured Ambulance - Unarmed ambulance with a higher roofline, can carry 4 stretcher patients.
- Type 90 Recovery Vehicle - Has a slightly wider hull and is equipped with a 1-tonne crane, generator and welding equipment.
- Type 90 Self-Propelled Artillery Rocket Launcher - Variant with a 30-round 130 mm rocket launcher mounted on top of the hull. A total of 60 rockets is carried on board. Crew: 6.
- Type 90 Self-Propelled Mortar 120mm - With a 120 mm mortar Type W86 and 50 rounds in the hull rear. The mortar is fired through a big circular opening in the hull roof and has a range of 11 km. Weight: 15 tonnes.
- Type 90 Self-Propelled Mortar 82mm - With an 82 mm mortar Type W87 mounted in the rear hull and 112 rounds of ammunition. Weight: 14.6 tonnes.
- Type 91 Armoured Infantry Fighting Vehicle - This version is powered by the 360 hp engine and has a longer chassis with 6 roadwheels either side. It is fitted with a 2-man turret which is very similar to that of the Russian BMP-2. The turret can be armed with an automatic gun of calibre 23, 25 or 30 mm.
- Type 91 Self-Propelled Howitzer 122mm - Turret-less version with a Type 85 122 mm howitzer mounted on top of the open rear hull. 40 rounds of ammunition are provided. Crew: 6. Weight: 17.4 tonnes. This version too has a longer chassis and 360 hp engine.
- Type 91 Re-Supply Vehicle - Logistics version.

== Operators ==
- Myanmar - 250+ in service
