= 2S15 Norov =

- Type: Self-propelled anti-tank gun
- Place of origin: Soviet Union

Production history
- Designed: 1976-1985
- Produced: 1980

Specifications
- Length: 7260 mm
- Width: 2850 mm

The 2S15 Norov (Russian: 2С15 «Норов», "Vice") is a Soviet self-propelled gun based on the 2S1 Gvozdika, itself based on the MT-LBu chassis. The 2S15 was not mass-produced.

== History ==
During the 1970s, the Soviet Union identified new requirements for anti-tank weapons, which required self-propelled anti-tank guns to combine mobility, counterattacking firepower and, accuracy, allowing them to hit targets at considerable distances from their firing positions. With these in mind, a decision was made by the USSR military–industrial complex on May 17, 1976, to give the task of designing a lightweight 100 mm-caliber self-propelled anti-tank gun to a group of enterprises. The self-propelled gun was supposed to include an automatic radar fire control system, and was given the code name "Norov".

The gun was designed to be based on the 2S1 Gvozdika self-propelled howitzer, the entire project being headed by the Yurga Machine-Building Plant, while the automatic radar fire control system would be built by the Tula-based Strela design bureau. Prototypes of the 2S15 would be built by KB Arsenal, but production did not finish before the deadline, which delayed the presentation of the gun to 1981, when the guns again failed to present themselves. Tests of the gun began in 1983, where problems and shortcomings were discovered, and were completed in 1985. However, by that time, with the introduction of new models of tanks, the 100 mm gun proved to be of little use against their intended targets. The Norov project was seen as unpromising, and was shut down by the USSR military-industrial complex in December 1985.
