= Type 63 (armoured personnel carrier) =

Type 63 (YW531)
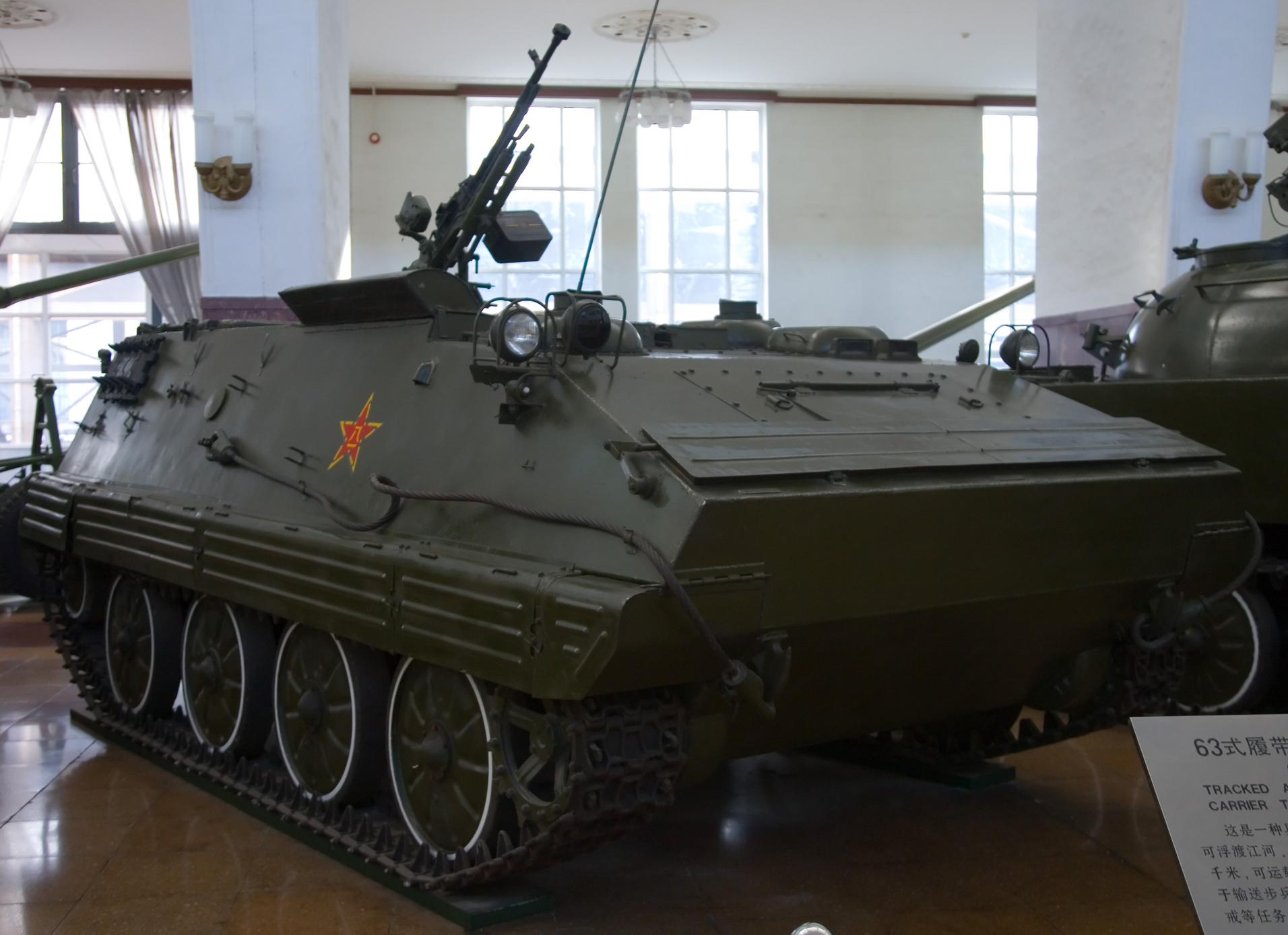
- Type 63 APC
- Type: Armoured personnel carrier
- Place of origin: China

Service history
- Wars: Vietnam War; Angolan Civil War; Uganda–Tanzania War; Sino-Vietnamese War; Iran–Iraq War; Sri Lankan Civil War; Gulf War; 2003 invasion of Iraq; War in Iraq (2013–2017); Sudanese civil war (2023–present)

Production history
- Manufacturer: 618 Factory / Norinco

Specifications
- Mass: 12.6 tonnes
- Length: 5.476 m
- Width: 2.978 m
- Height: 2.58 m
- Crew: 2 + 10
- Armor: 14 mm maximum, welded steel
- Main armament: Type 54 12.7 mm machine gun
- Engine: 8-cylinder air-cooled, turbo-charged diesel KHD BF8L 413F; 320 hp 320 hp
- Suspension: torsion bar
- Operational range: 500 km
- Maximum speed: 65 km/h, off-road 46 km/h

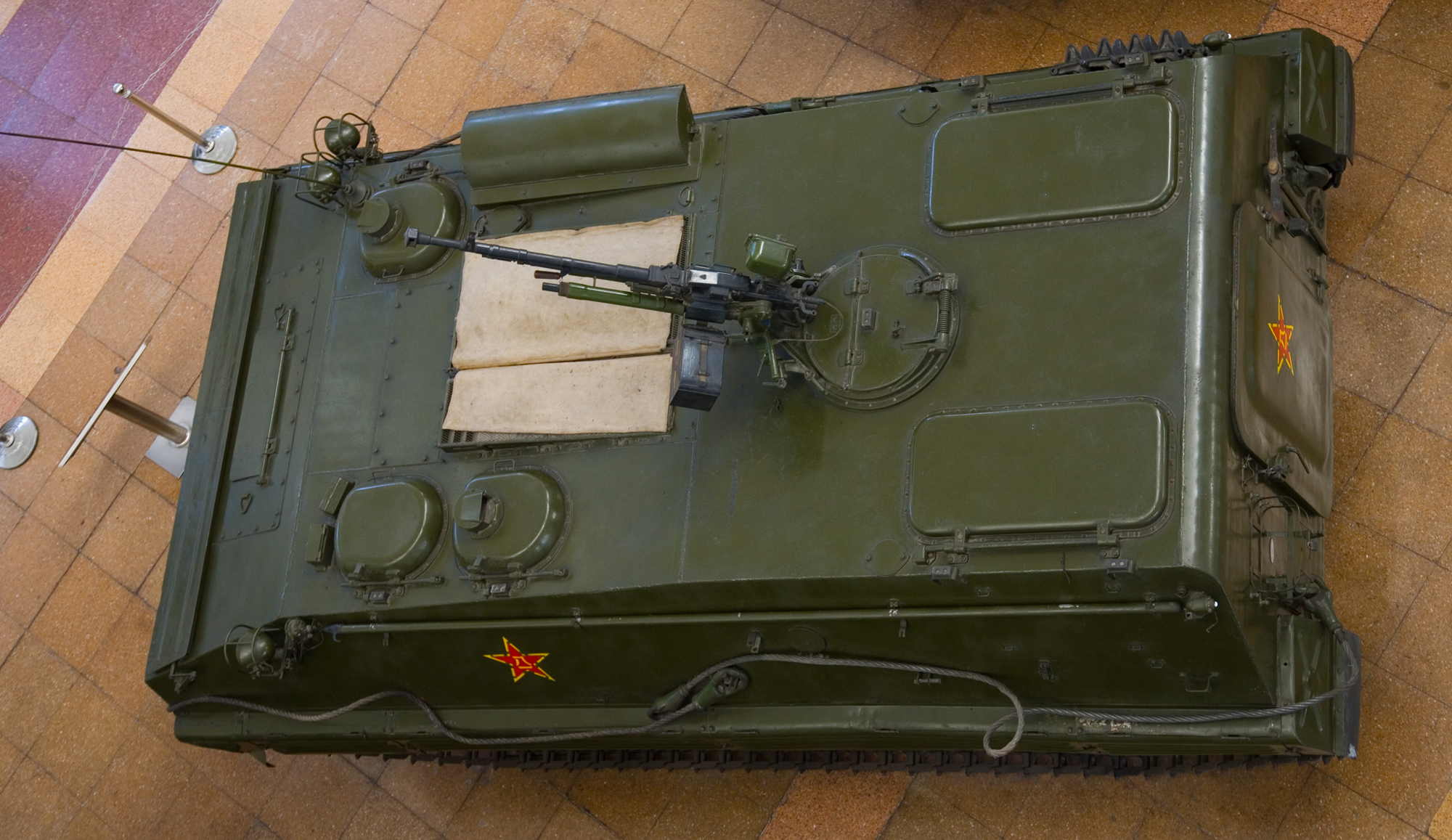
Top-shot of a Type 63 APC (A531) at the Beijing Military Museum

The Type 63 (industrial designation YW531) is a Chinese armoured personnel carrier that entered service in the late 1960s. It was the first armoured vehicle designed in China without Soviet assistance. The design is simple and is comparable to other APCs of its time such as the M113.

Approximately 8,000 all types and variants were produced by Norinco. It also equips several armies around the world and has seen action in different conflicts including the Vietnam War, the Sino-Vietnamese War, the Iran–Iraq War, and the Gulf War.

== Development ==
In July 1958, the central government of the People's Republic of China proclaimed in a national scientific development strategic plan that called for a tracked armoured personnel carrier that can be ready for mass production in 1960, in less than two years, and Yong Ding Machinery Factory (永定机械厂) – later incorporated into the NORINCO group was to be responsible for the manufacturing of the new APC.

The design work was left to No. 1 Institute of the First Machinery works (then focusing on tanks design) and the Fourth faculty of the Harbin Engineering Academy to be under the supervision of the Scientific department of the PLA Armour Corp., Fifth Department of First Machinery Works and Soviet experts.

== Description ==
The hull is made of welded steel, and provides protection against small arms fire. The vehicle carries a maximum of 15 including crew, which depending on the particular configuration may be two or four, the rest of the passengers are infantry who sit in a compartment at the rear of the vehicle. The driver sits in the front left of the hull, and has a single piece hatch, which opens to the left. The driver is provided with two day periscopes which cover the front and right of the vehicle. One of the drivers periscopes can be replaced by a night vision device. The commander sits on the front right of the hull, and has a single piece hatch which opens to the right. The commander hatch has a periscope on the top surface that may be rotated through 360 degrees. Export variants of the vehicle with BF8L engine did away with the commander's position in the front right of the hull. Behind the driver, on the left side of the hull is a third crew position, which is provided with a hatch that opens to the left, and like the commander's position has a 360-degree rotating periscope.

The engine sits to the right rear of the driver. It has a large intake located in the top of the hull, with an exhaust on the right hand side. The engine is either a Type 6150L 260 hp diesel engine or, on export versions, an 8-cylinder air-cooled, turbocharged diesel engine KHD BF8L 413F which develops 320 horsepower at 2,500 rpm. The engine feeds a manual transmission with five forward gears and one reverse gear. Track is driven at the front by a drive sprocket, and passes over four rubber-typed road wheels, then loops over an idler at the rear, before returning to the front again. No return rollers are fitted, the track rests on the top of the road wheels. Suspension is of the torsion bar type. The vehicle has a fuel capacity of 450 litres, which gives it a road range of around 500 kilometers.

A 12.7 millimetre calibre machine gun is located in an open mount at the front of a small hatch in the center of the hull which opens into the troop compartment. The gun can traverse through 360 degrees and can be elevated to an angle of 90 degrees. Two roof hatches and a large rear door provide access to the troop compartment.

The vehicle is amphibious, a folding trim board stowed at the front of the hull needs to be raised, and the vehicle can then propel itself in the water using its tracks.

== Variants ==
Variants are often designated by their manufacturer. WZ stands for Wu Zhuang Jia (armored vehicle 5) and designates the vehicles produced by the Fifth Machinery Works. YW stands for Yongding Wai Mao (Yongding external trade).

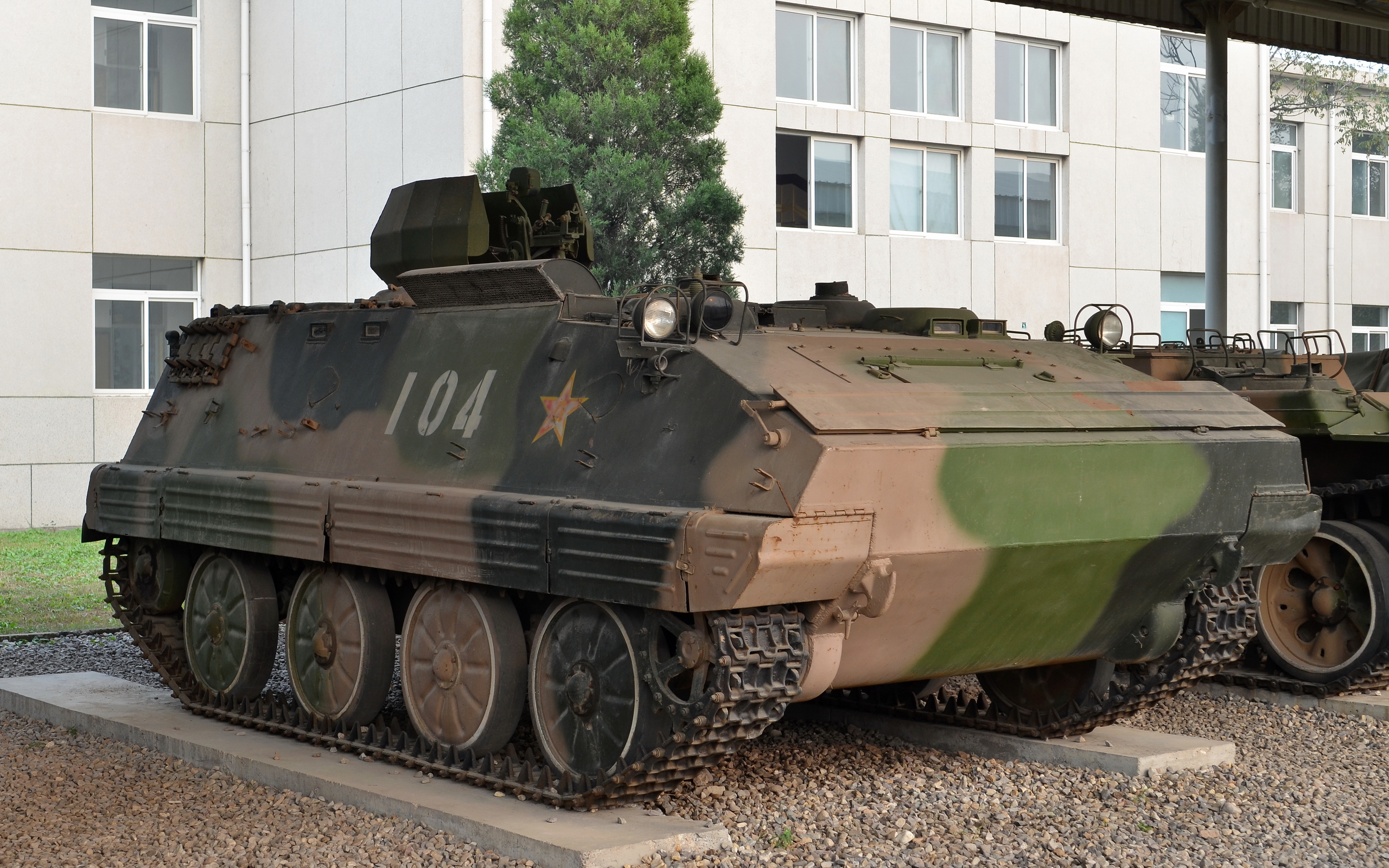
63-2 (WZ531) at the Military Museum

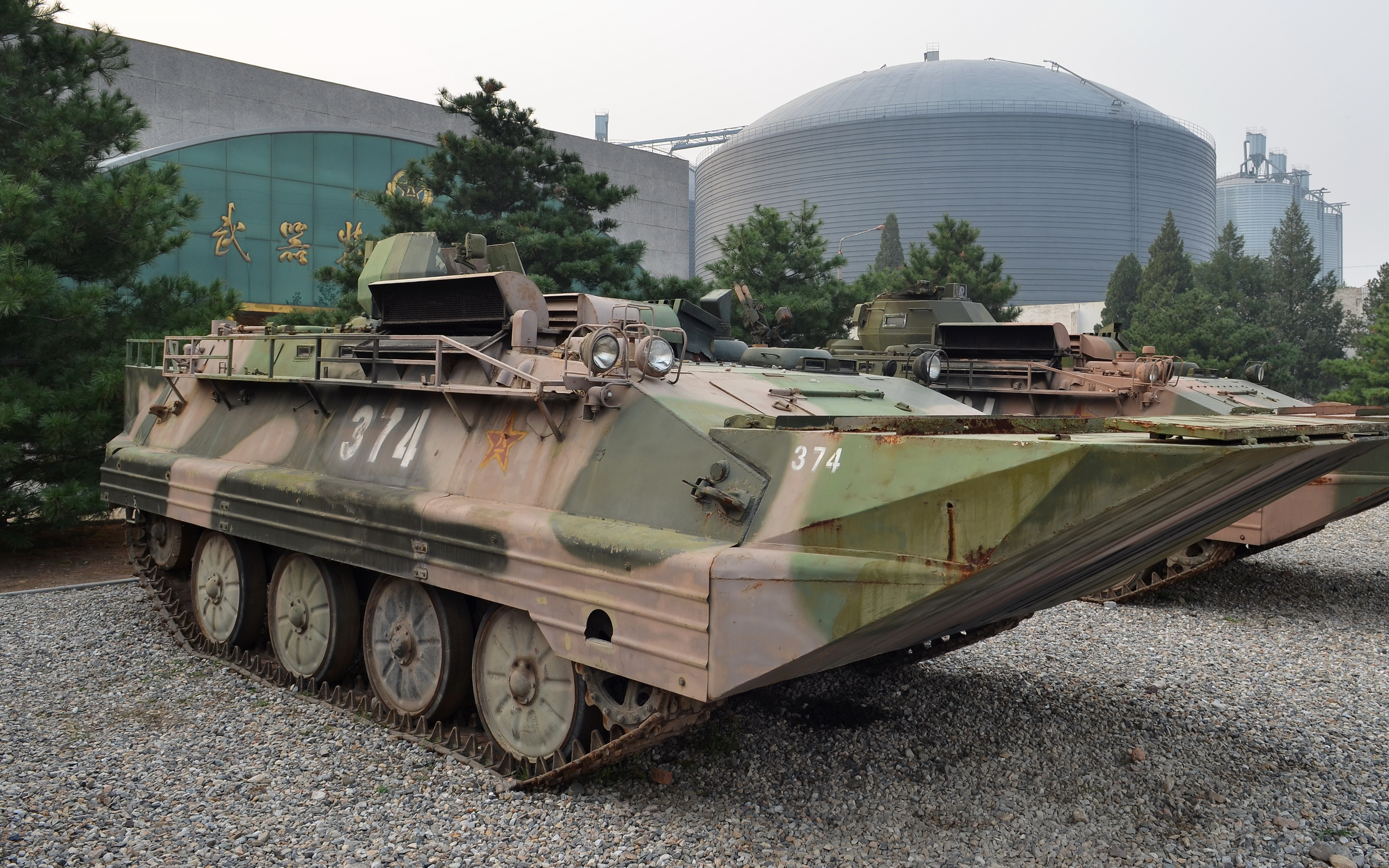
63 Amphibious APC at the Military Museum

- Type 531 (1963 or 1961) – Basic version with Type 56 7.62 mm machine gun, not mass-produced.
- Type A531 or Type 63 (1968 or 1963) – Production variant with 12.7 mm machine gun Type 54, uprated engine and different transmission. Also known as Type 531A.
  - VTT-323 – North Korean version of the Type A531.
- Type B531 or Type 63-I (1981) – Improved version with stronger suspension, additional firing ports and two additional roof hatches.
  - Type 63C – PLA version of the YW531C.
- Type 63CA – PLA version of the YW531E.
- Type WZ701 – Command version of the Type A531 with higher troop compartment and fitted with up to five radios (Type 889, Type 892, Type 70-2B) and a generator. Armament consists of a Type 56-1 machine gun of 7.62 mm.
- Type WZ721 – Communications relay vehicle with higher roof line and ZZT1 set.
- Type WZ750 – Armoured ambulance with higher roof line, unarmed.
- Type WZ302 or Type 54-1/Type 63-1 SPH – Self-propelled artillery version of the Type B531 mounting a 122 mm Type 54-I howitzer. An improved version, the Type 70, has a longer chassis. Both vehicles also mount a Type 67 machine gun.
- Type WZ303 or Type 70 MRL – Rocket artillery version of the Type A531 with 19-tube 130 mm multiple rocket launcher (similar to the BM-14 MRL).
- YD801 – Fire fighting vehicle.
- ZZM88 – Cryptography vehicle. Program begun in July 1984 and entered service in August 1992. Used to provide cryptographic codes for other vehicles.
- Type WZ534 (Type 89)
- SPAAA Type WZ531 - ZSD63 with PG87 25mm dual barreled AA gun.

=== Export ===
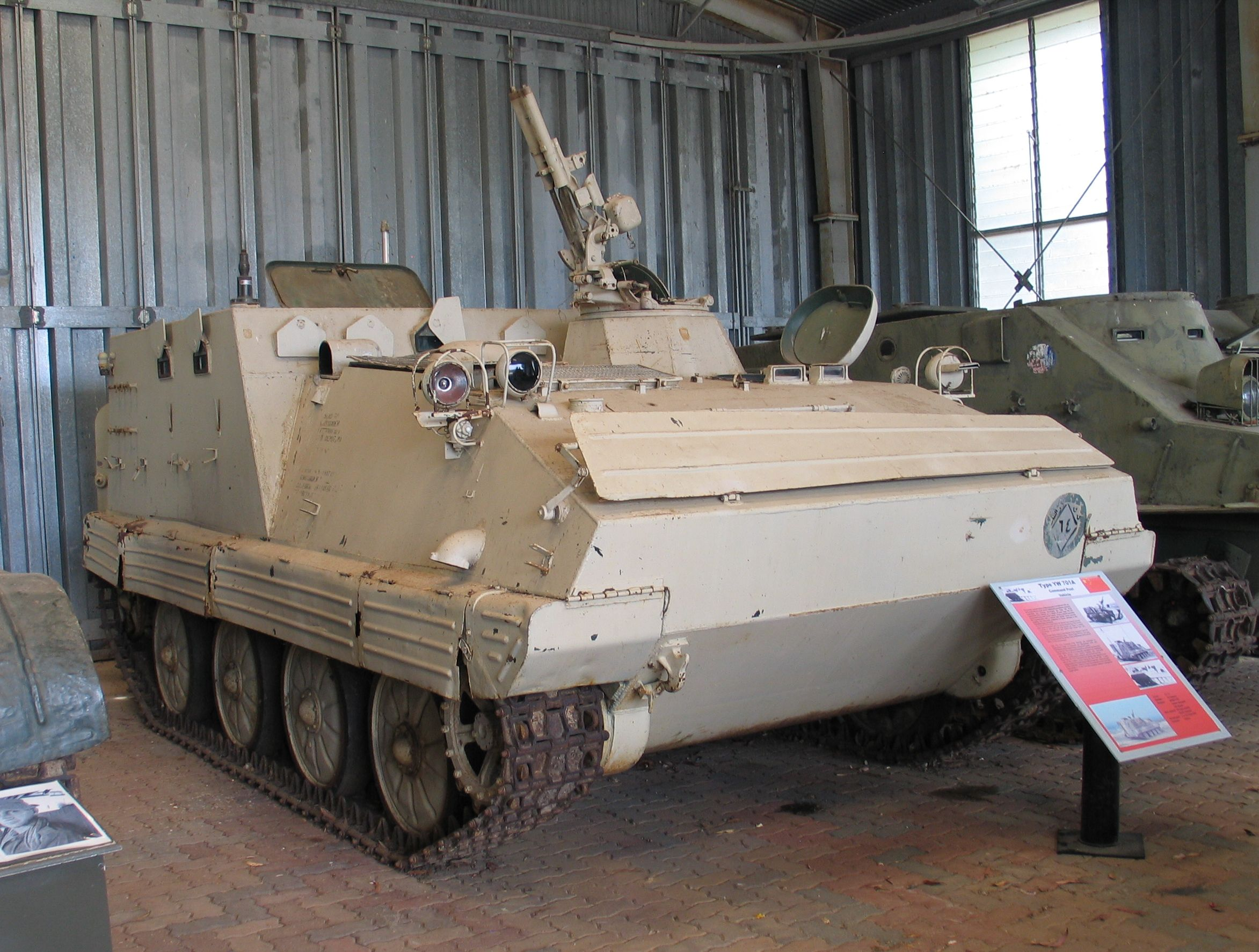
Former Iraqi YW701 command vehicle at the Puckkapunyal Military Museum

- Type YW531C (1982) – Export version of the 531 series with German Deutz engine KHD BF8L of 320 hp (240 kW). The machine gunner's position front right was deleted.
- Type YW531D – Modified version with only 1 instead of 2 firing ports on the left side.
- Type YW531E – As per YW531D but with one additional radio Type 892.
- Type YW701 – Export version of the Type WZ701 command post vehicle. Based on the Type YW531C and equipped with a commander's cupola with Type 54 machine gun. Improved version Type YW701A.
- Type YW750 – Export version of the Type WZ750 armoured ambulance. Based on the Type YW531C and equipped with a commander's cupola with Type 54 machine gun.
- Type YW304 – Self-propelled 82 mm mortar with 120 rounds, based on the Type YW531C/Type 531H.
- Type YW381 – Self-propelled 120 mm mortar with 50 rounds, based on the Type YW531C.
- Type YW531H (Type 85)

== Combat history ==
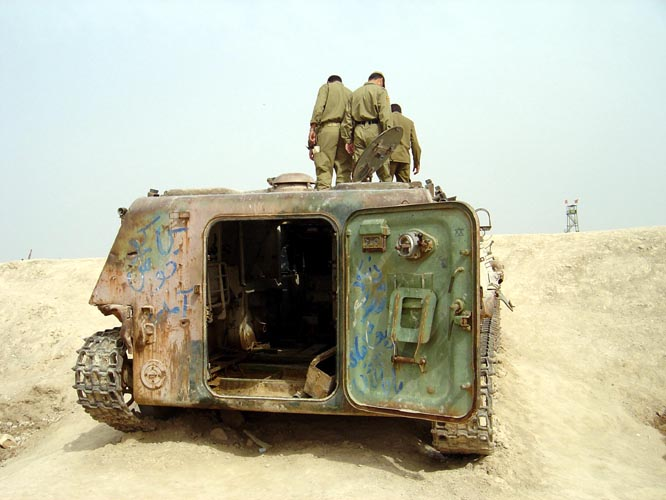
A destroyed Type 63 at the Iran-Iraq border.

The Type 63 has been fielded by Vietnamese and Chinese armies during the Vietnam War and the Sino-Vietnamese War. During the Chinese invasion of Vietnam, it proved to be very valuable because of its protection and its cross-country abilities. The Zairan forces used it during the Angolan Civil War, as did the Tanzanians during the Uganda–Tanzania War. During the Iran–Iraq War, China exported quantities of Type 63s to Iraq. These vehicles have seen further service during the Gulf War and the 2003 invasion of Iraq. The Peshmerga forces used at least one Type 63 APC against the Islamic State. The Type 63 has also been used during the Sudanese civil war.

== Operators ==
=== Current operators ===
- Iraqi Kurdistan – Seen in use against ISIL forces during the 2010s.
- Myanmar - 150 YW-531H in service
- North Korea
- Pakistan - 100 Type-63, and locally built APC Maaz.
- Sri Lanka
- Sudan – 50 received in 1981
- Vietnam – 80
- Zimbabwe – 30 received in 1981. 8 in service

=== Former operators ===
- Albania – 103 received in 1963–1974.
- Bangladesh – ~50
- China – Around 2,400 Type 63 and Type 63C in service by 2016; Fully retired by 2018; Around 500 remain in 2023, possibly in storage. YD801 Firefighting variant also used by defunct People's Armed Police Forestry Corps.
- Iraq - 650 delivered in 1982–1988 (although Iraqi Kurdish forces were seen using them against ISIL forces).
- Tanzania – ~30
- Zaire – 12 delivered in 1976.
- LTTE – 1 captured from the Sri Lanka Army and converted to light tank with a Alvis Saladin turret. Recaptured by the Sri Lanka Army in 2009.

=== Evaluation purposes ===
- Australia - Captured and given to Australia in 1972 by the South Vietnamese government and then tested.

== See also ==
Comparable vehicles of similar design

- Pansarbandvagn 302 – (Sweden)
- FV432 – (United Kingdom)
- M113 armored personnel carrier – (United States)

== Bibliography ==
- International Institute for Strategic Studies (February 2016). The Military Balance 2016. Vol. 116. Routlegde. ISBN 9781857438352.
- International Institute for Strategic Studies (February 2016). The Military Balance 2023. Vol. 116. Routlegde. ISBN 9781032508955.
- Lai, Benjamin (2016). The Dragon's Teeth: The Chinese People's Liberation Army--Its History, Traditions, and Air Sea and Land Capability in the 21st Century. Casemate. ISBN 9781612003894.
