= Type 77 (armored personnel carrier) =

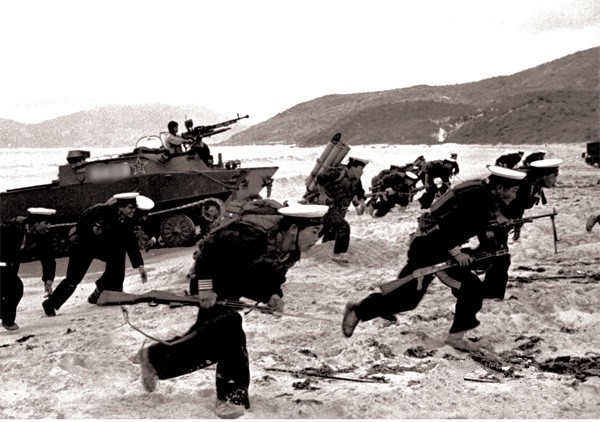
- Type 77 armoured personnel carrier advancing with People's Liberation Army Marine Corps soldiers.
- Type: Amphibious armoured personnel carrier
- Place of origin: People's Republic of China

Service history
- In service: 1978 – present

Production history
- Manufacturer: Norinco

Specifications
- Mass: 15.5 tonnes
- Length: 7.15 m
- Width: 3.2 m
- Height: 2.16 m
- Crew: 2 + 20
- Armor: Welded steel
- Main armament: 12.7 mm machine gun
- Engine: 12150L-2 12-cylinder liquid-cooled diesel 402 hp (300 kW) at 2,000 rpm
- Power/weight: 25.8 hp/t
- Suspension: torsion bar
- Fuel capacity: 416 l
- Operational range: 370 km (road)
- Maximum speed: 60 km/h (road); 12 km/h (water)

The Norinco Type 77 is a Chinese amphibious armoured personnel carrier. First fielded in 1978, it is similar to the Soviet BTR-50 in function. Like the BTR-50 designed by putting a higher hull on the PT-76 light tank chassis, Type 77 is based on the Type 63 light tank, which is itself a derivative of PT-76, making both vehicles very similar.

== Design ==
The Type 77 was designed in 1978 based on the Type 63 after certification to manufacture it was received in 1977.

The Type 77 is equipped with a 12.7 machine gun mounted on top with no protection for the gunner.

== Variants ==
=== Base variants ===
- Type 77 - Chinese tracked amphibious APC based on the Type 63-I amphibious light tank. The industrial designator is WZ511.
  - Type 77-1 - amphibious armoured personnel/artillery carrier designed to carry a disassembled gun (85 mm towed anti-tank gun or 120 mm towed howitzer) on the roof. The vehicle has hydraulic winch and ramps to load/unload the gun. The industrial designator is WZ511-1.
  - Type 77-2 - amphibious armoured personnel carrier. No winch and ramps. The industrial designator is WZ511-2.
  - Type 76 ARV - recovery vehicle.

=== Major modifications ===
- Type 89 self-propelled howitzer (PLZ-89) - Type 77 converted into a self-propelled howitzer armed with 122 mm gun. Although most vehicles were based on Type 77 APCs, some vehicles were based on Type 63-I amphibious light tanks.
- Type 77 Armoured Engineering Vehicle - Military engineering vehicle variant featuring two water-jets, excavation crane, and hydraulically-operated dozer in a V-blade configuration.

== Operators ==
- China: 200 to 300 Type 77s formerly used by the PLA Marine Corp for combat support.
