= Type 89 AFV =

Type 89 (YW534)
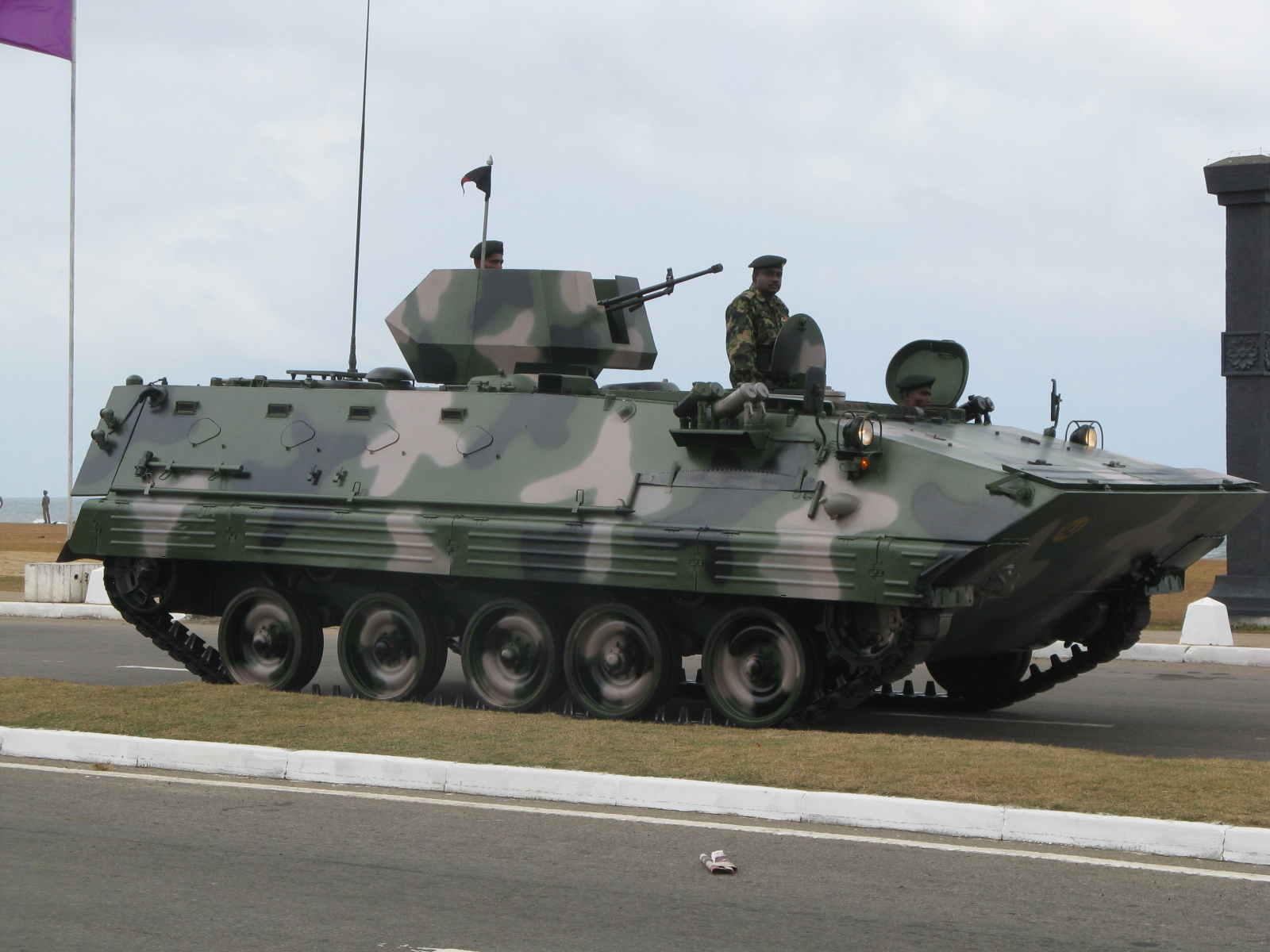
- Type 89
- Type: Armoured personnel carrier
- Place of origin: China

Service history
- Wars: Second Congo War; Internal Conflict in Myanmar; Tigray War; War in Amhara

Production history
- Designed: 1980s
- Manufacturer: Norinco
- Produced: 1990–present

Specifications
- Mass: 14.3 tonnes (14.1 long tons; 15.8 short tons)
- Length: 6.15 m (20.2 ft)
- Width: 3.130 m (10.27 ft)
- Height: 2.590 m (8 ft 6.0 in)
- Crew: 2 (commander and driver), 13 passengers
- Armor: Welded steel hull, able to resist rounds up to 12.7mm
- Main armament: 1x QJC88 12.7mm anti-aircraft machine gun
- Engine: Deutz BF8L 413F 4-cycle air-cooled diesel 320 hp (240 kW)
- Suspension: torsion bar
- Operational range: 500 km (310 mi)
- Maximum speed: 66 km/h (41 mph)

The Norinco Type 89 tracked armoured fighting vehicle is a Chinese armoured personnel carrier. It was developed from the earlier export market Type 85 AFV vehicle. It entered service in the late 1990s and was first shown publicly in 1999. There are approximately 1,000 in service. It has the industrial index of WZ534 and although it was mainly developed for the PLA, there is also an export version YW534.

In the 1990s, a new designator system was introduced in the PLA and the Type 89 APC is nowadays known as ZSD-89.

== Description ==
When compared to the Type 85, the Type 89 is slightly larger and heavier. The hull is made of welded steel, and provides protection against small arms fire. The vehicle carries a maximum of 15 including crew. The driver sits in the front left of the hull, and has a single piece hatch, which opens to the left. The driver is provided with three day periscopes which cover the front and right of the vehicle. One of the driver's periscopes can be replaced by a night vision device. The commander sits behind the driver and has a single piece hatch.

The air-cooled, turbocharged diesel engine sits to the right rear of the driver. It has a large intake located in the top of the hull, with an exhaust on the right hand side. The engine feeds a manual transmission with five forward gears and one reverse gear. Track is driven at the front by a drive sprocket, and passes over five dual rubber-typed road wheels and track-return rollers, then loops over an idler at the rear, before returning to the front again.

A 12.7 millimetre calibre machine gun is located in an open mount at the front of a small hatch in the center of the hull which opens into the troop compartment. The gun can traverse through 360 degrees and can be elevated to an angle of 90 degrees. Two oblong roof hatches and a large rear door provide access to the troop compartment. On either side of the forward hull, a cluster of four 76 mm smoke grenade dischargers is mounted.

The vehicle is amphibious, a folding trim board stowed at the front of the hull needs to be raised, and the vehicle can then propel itself in the water using its tracks. Standard equipment includes an NBC system, a Type 889 or CWT-167 radio, and a Type 803 or CYY-168 intercom system.

Type 89A is developed in the 2010s as support vehicles for PLA's heavy mechanized brigades.

== Variants ==
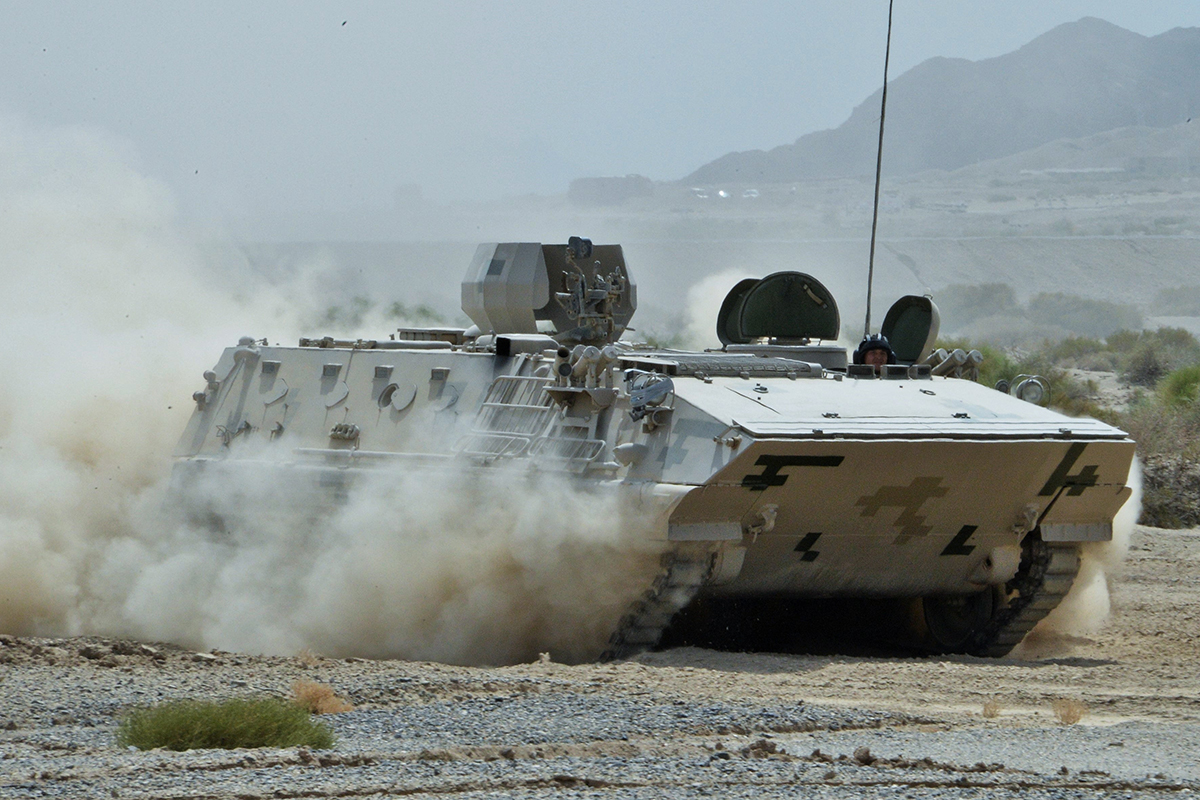
ZSD-89

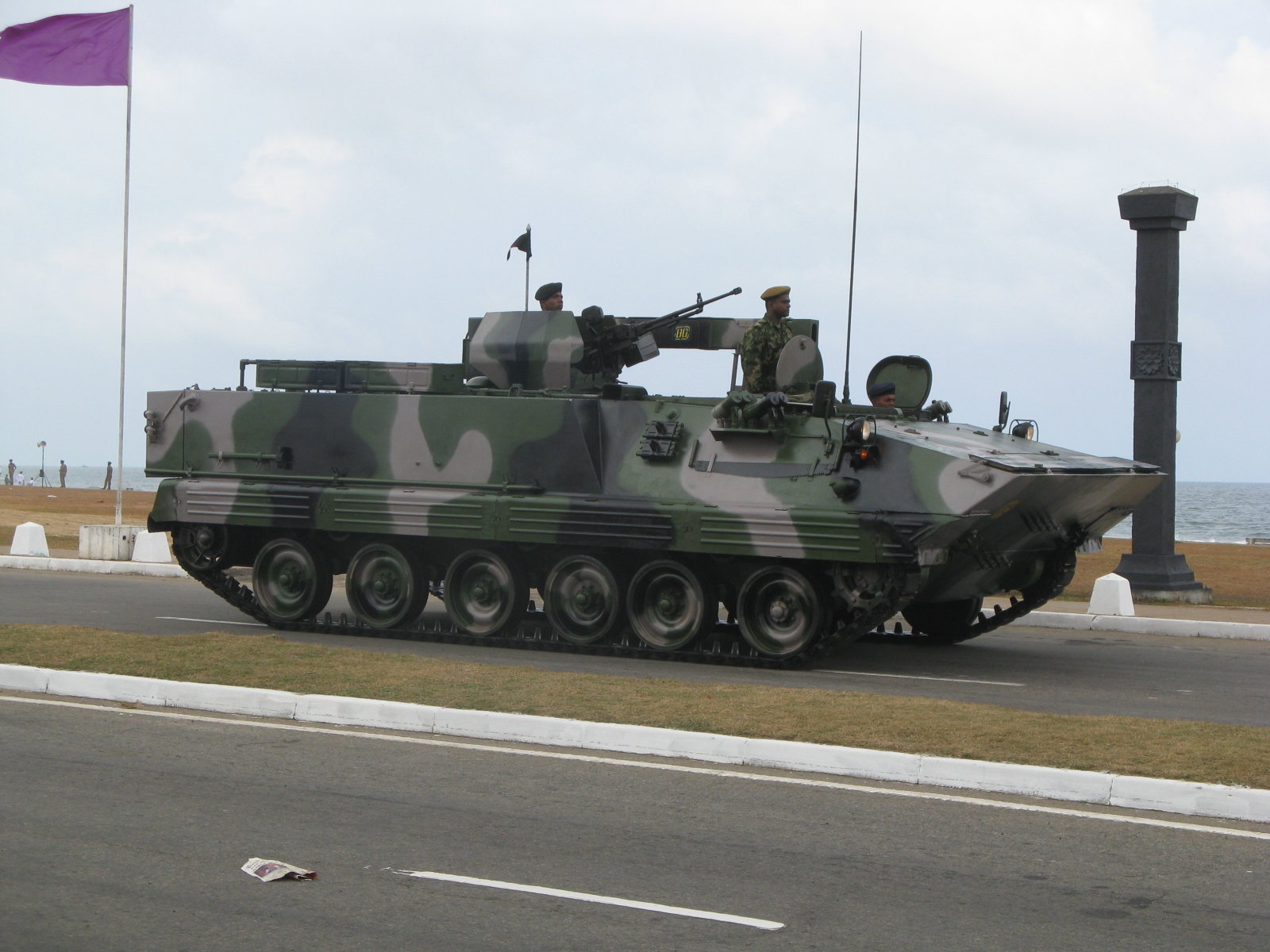
Type 89 recovery vehicle with extended chassis

=== Type 89 ===
Baseline Type 89 AFV, developed in 1980s.

- Type 89 Tracked Armoured Personnel Carrier or Type WZ534 – Basic version, as described. Military designator: ZSD-89.
- Type 89 Infantry Fighting Vehicle or Type YW307 – Fitted with a one-man turret with 25 mm automatic gun (400 rounds) and 7.62 mm coaxial machine gun (1,000 rounds). Crew: 3+7. Military designator: ZSD-89-II.
- Type 89 Armored Command Vehicle – Fitted with a higher roofline and with a longer chassis with 6 double road wheels either side. Armament consists of a 12.7 mm HMG on the commander's station behind the driver.
- Type 89 Armored Ambulance or Type WZ752 – Unarmed ambulance with a red cross mark on each side.
- Type 89 Armored Reconnaissance Vehicle or Type WZ731 – Variant for armored reconnaissance: ZZC-01.
- Type 89 Artillery Front-line Observation Vehicle or GCL-45 – Variant for artillery forward observers, equipped with an unarmed turret with observation devices. Military designator. Military designator: ZZC-05.
- Type 89 Recce Radar Carrier – Equipped with a battlefield surveillance radar on a crane. Military designator: ZZC-02.
- Type 89 Refuelling Vehicle – Transport vehicle for fuel and lubricants, fitted with a higher troop compartment. Offered for export as the Amphibious Armoured Refuelling Vehicle.
- Type 89 Recovery Vehicle – Maintenance and recovery variant, fitted with a light crane on the left side of the hull roof, and a machine gun cupola in the roof center. Military designator: ZJX-93 (also called Type 93).
- Type 89 Supply Vehicle – Similar to the recovery variant and also equipped with a light crane, but the commander's cupola with HMG is located behind the driver's position. Military designator: ZHB-94.
- Type 89 AT missile carrier – ATGM carrier vehicle with double launch system for wire-guided HJ-8 missiles. A total of 12 missiles is carried on board. Military designator: ZDF-1 or ZDF-89.
- Type 89 Mine-Laying Vehicle – Has a modified rear hull that mounts a scatterable mine system, consisting of 6 launchers. Each launcher has 36 tubes of 122 mm with each tube containing 5 SATM mines, 15 SAPM mines, 45 SAPEM mines or a mix of SAPM and SAPEM mines. Military designator: GBL-130.
- Type 89 Obstacle-Removing Vehicle – Crowd-control variant for the PAP, equipped with an obstacle clearing blade.

=== Type 89A ===
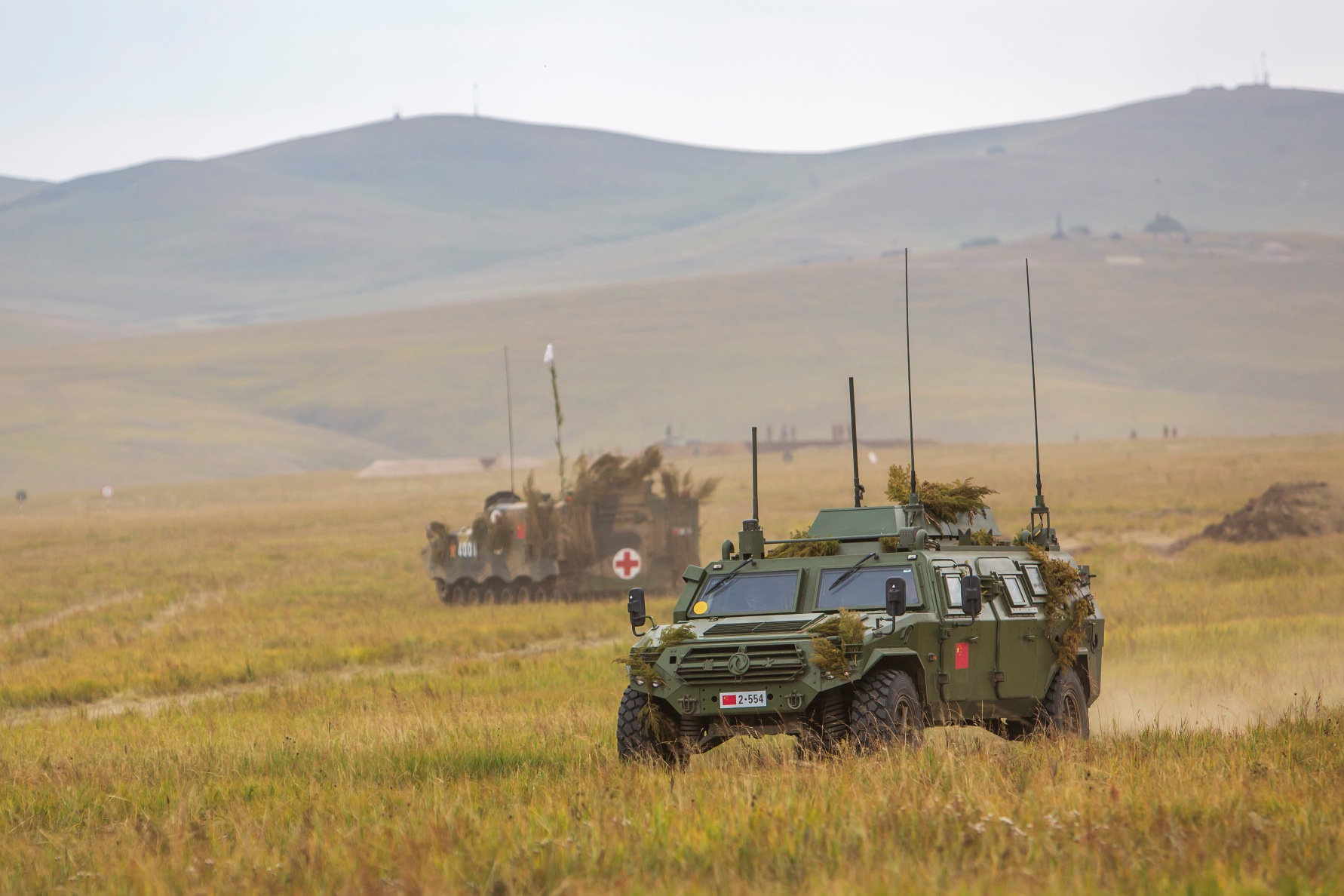
Type 89A Armored Ambulance can be seen in the background behind the CSK-131 high mobility vehicle

Type 89A has extended chassis, higher roofline, and side armor is completely vertically welded (whereas Type 89 is sloped). The armor is reinforced with better ballistic protection, comparing to the original Type 89. The vehicle chassis features side-skirt with a distinctive wave pattern. Type 89A is developed in 2000s, complementing ZBD-04 series.

- Type 89A Armored Personnel Carrier (ZSD-89A) – Type 89A base model with armor-plated 12.7 mm HMG turret.
- Type 89A Armored Command Vehicle – Type 89A extended chassis with command and control equipment, and a 12.7 mm HMG for self-defense.
- Type 89A Armored Communication Vehicle – Type 89A extended chassis with additional communication equipment.
- Type 89A Armored Ambulance – Unarmed ambulance with a higher roofline and with a longer chassis with 6 double road wheels either side.
- Type 89A Armored Reconnaissance Vehicle – Armed with ZBL-08 turret with electro-optical sensors, radars on a telescopic mast, and an UAV launcher rail. Aerial reconnaissance capabilities are provided with various unmanned aerial vehicles. All reconnaissance vehicles are equipped with a launch rail behind the turret, capable of launching ASN-15 with 10 kilometres (6.2 mi) range and one-hour endurance. BZK UAV can also be stored and assembled on the spot if longer-range aerial reconnaissance is needed. In addition, individual scouts are equipped with hand-launched remote-controlled SUAV similar to RQ-11 Raven.
- Type 89A Artillery Reconnaissance Vehicle – Fitted with a higher roofline and with a longer chassis, and equipped with a battlefield surveillance radar on a retractable mast.
- Type 89A Electro-Optical Reconnaissance Vehicle – Fitted with electro-optical sensors and radars for battlefield surveillance missions. The vehicle features CS/LK5, a remote weapon station mounting QJC-88 for self-defense purposes.
- PLZ-10 – 120 mm self-Propelled gun-mortar based on Type 89A chassis. The primary armament of the PLZ-10 is a 120 mm rifled gun-mortar, with a range of 1.2–13.5 km (0.75–8.39 mi) and support both direct and indirect fire support mode. The turret has a 360° traverse and a -4 ° to +80° vertical elevation. The hull contains 36 various types of mortar rounds. Secondary 12.7 mm heavy machine gun is mounted on the roof for self-defense.

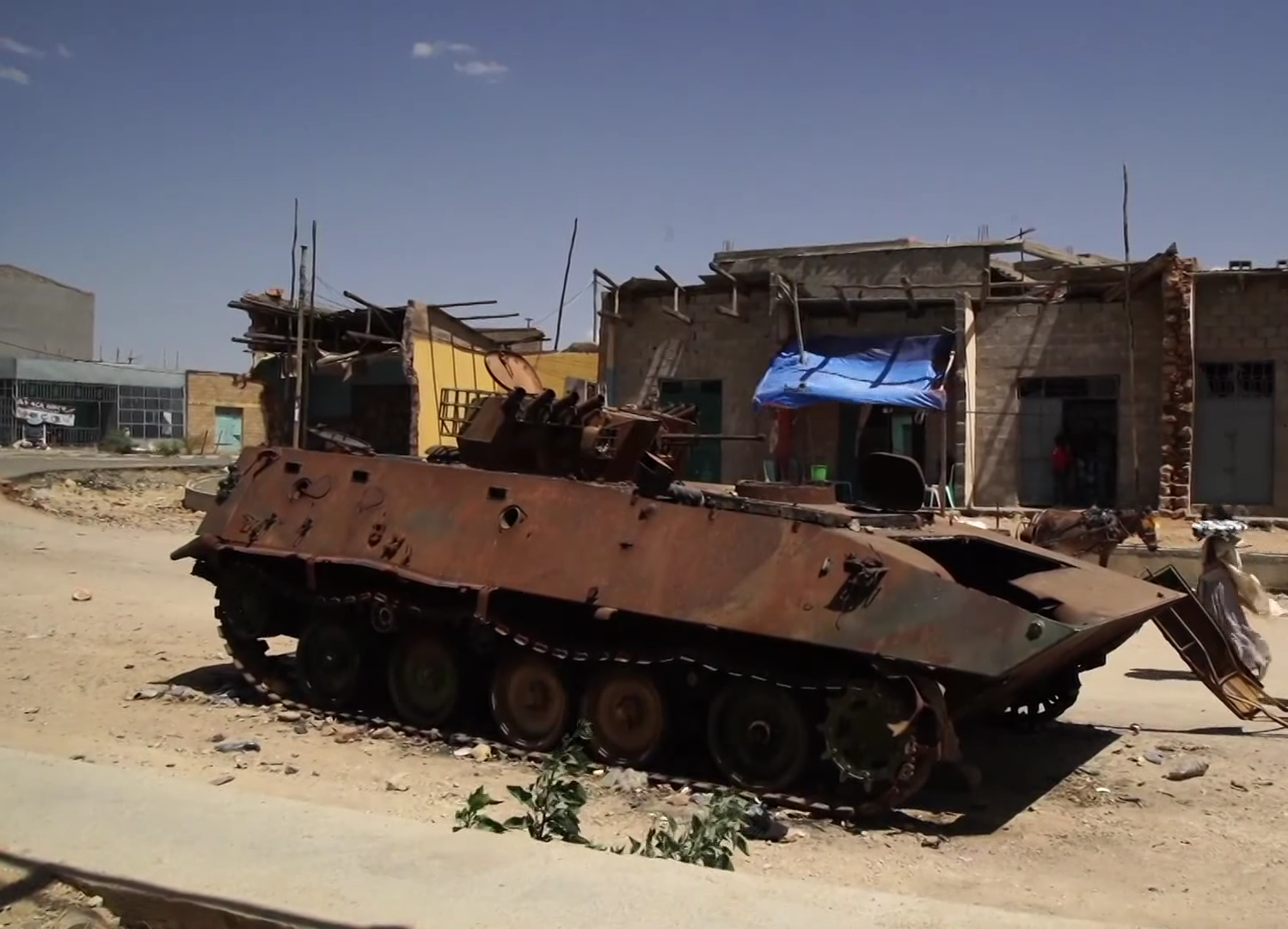
A destroyed Type 89 in Axum, Tigray Region, Ethiopia in June 2021

=== Export ===
- Type 90 AFV or Type YW535
- VP1 – Export name for ZSD-89 armored personnel carrier.
- ST-2 – Also called ST2. Fire support variant, based on extended Type 89 hull with six road wheels, fitted with WMA301/ST-1 turret with NATO-compatible 105 mm tank gun.

== Operators ==
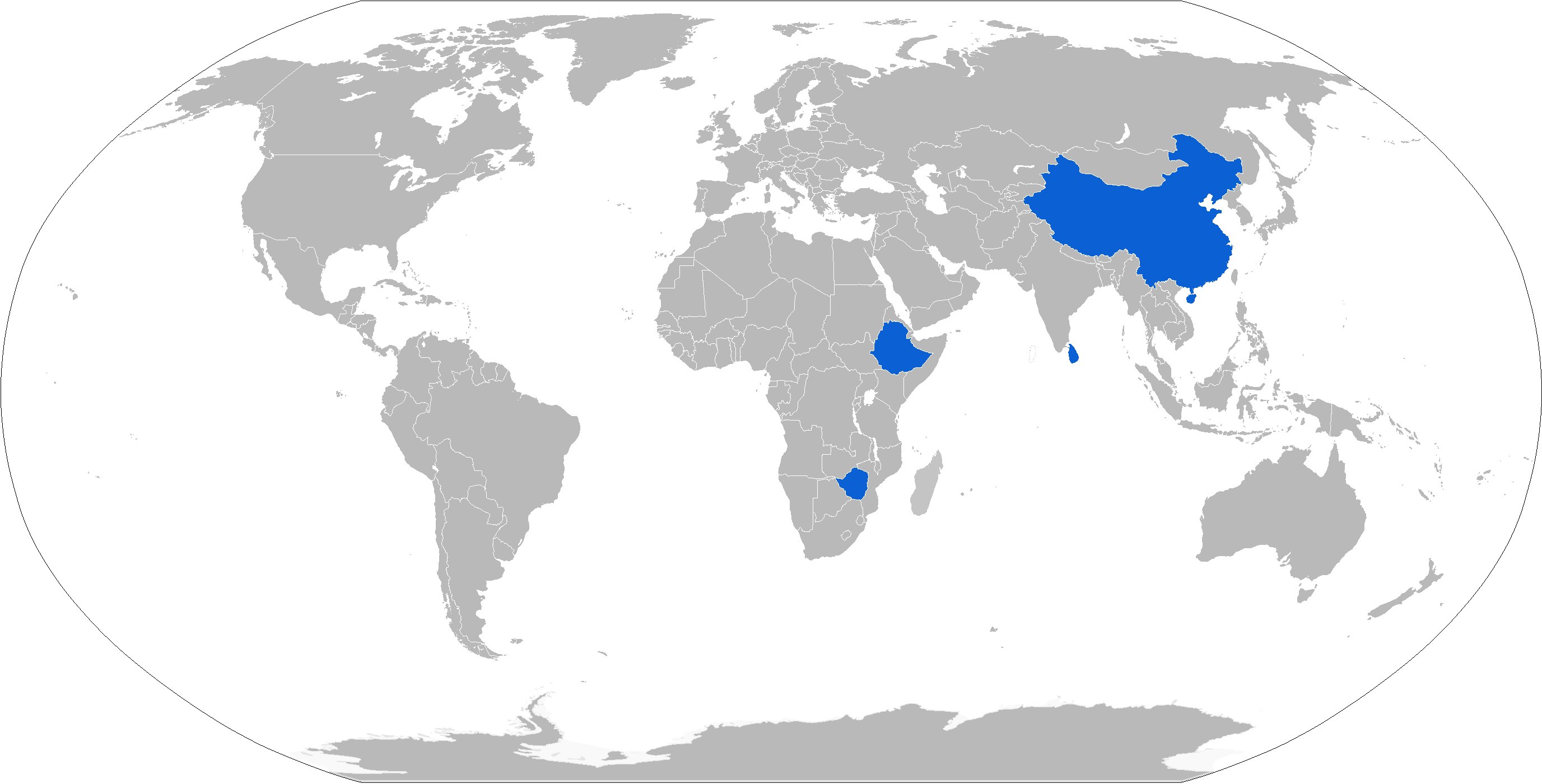
Map of Type 89 operators in blue

- Ethiopia 10 purchased in 2013 for operations in Somalia.
  - Tigray Defense Forces
- Myanmar – ZJX-93 (Type-93)
- China – 1,500 ZSD-89/A APC; 900 PLZ-10 Gun-Mortar;
- Sri Lanka
- Zimbabwe – ZSD-89-II, used during the Second Congo War
- Nigeria – 60 delivered in 2021.

== See also ==
- ZBD-04A, infantry fighting vehicle complementing Type 89 and Type 89A APC.
- M113
- MT-LB
