= Type 85 AFV =

Type 85 (YW531H)
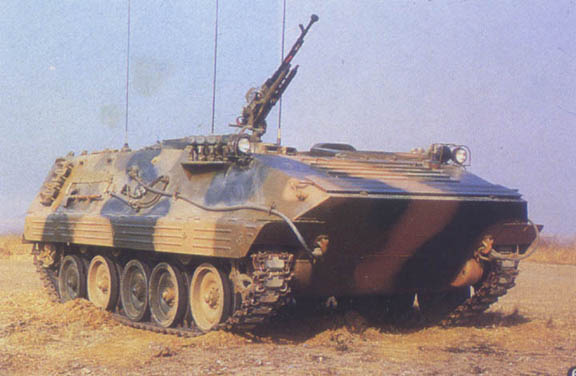
- Type: Armoured personnel carrier
- Place of origin: China

Service history
- Wars: 2025 Cambodian-Thai conflict

Production history
- Designed: 1980s
- Manufacturer: Norinco
- Produced: 1990

Specifications
- Mass: 13.6 tonne
- Length: 6.125 m (20 ft 1.1 in)
- Width: 3.060 m (10 ft 0.5 in)
- Height: 2.590 m (8 ft 6.0 in)
- Crew: 2 (commander and driver), 13 passengers
- Armor: Welded steel hull, resist rounds up to 12.7 mm
- Main armament: 1x 30 mm remote weapons station 1x Type 54 12.7 mm anti-aircraft machine gun
- Engine: Deutz BF8L 413F 4-stroke air-cooled diesel 320 hp (240 kW)
- Suspension: torsion bar
- Operational range: 500 km (310 mi)
- Maximum speed: 65 km/h (40 mph)

The Type 85 is a tracked armoured fighting vehicle produced by Chinese company Norinco (industrial index: Type YW531H). It is an improved version of the Type 63 armoured personnel carrier. The vehicle is bigger, has additional firing ports and periscopes, a longer chassis with an additional road wheel on each side, and is equipped with an NBC protection system.

The Type 85 series was developed in 1985, exclusively for the export market; for the PLA, the very similar Type 89 AFV was designed. The main user of the Type 85 series are the Royal Thai Armed Forces who received their first vehicles in 1987.

Currently, the improved Type 90 AFV is offered for export.

== Description ==
The hull is made of welded steel, and provides protection against small arms fire. The vehicle carries a maximum of 15 including crew. The driver sits in the front left of the hull, and has a single piece hatch, which opens to the left. The driver is provided with two day periscopes which cover the front and right of the vehicle. One of the drivers periscopes can be replaced by a night vision device. The commander sits behind the driver and has a single piece hatch.

The air-cooled, turbocharged diesel engine sits to the right rear of the driver. It has a large intake located in the top of the hull, with an exhaust on the right hand side. The engine feeds a manual transmission with five forward gears and one reverse gear. Track is driven at the front by a drive sprocket, and passes over five dual rubber-typed road wheels and track-return rollers, then loops over an idler at the rear, before returning to the front again.

A 12.7 millimetre calibre machine gun with armoured shields is located in an open mount at the front of a small hatch in the center of the hull which opens into the troop compartment. The gun can traverse through 360 degrees and can be elevated to an angle of 90 degrees. A total of 1,120 rounds is carried on board. Two oblong roof hatches and a large rear door provide access to the troop compartment. On either side of the forward hull, a cluster of four 76 mm smoke grenade dischargers is mounted.

The vehicle is amphibious, a folding trim board stowed at the front of the hull needs to be raised, and the vehicle can then propel itself in the water using its tracks. Standard equipment includes an NBC system, a Type 889 or VRC-83 radio, and a Type 803 intercom system.

== Variants ==
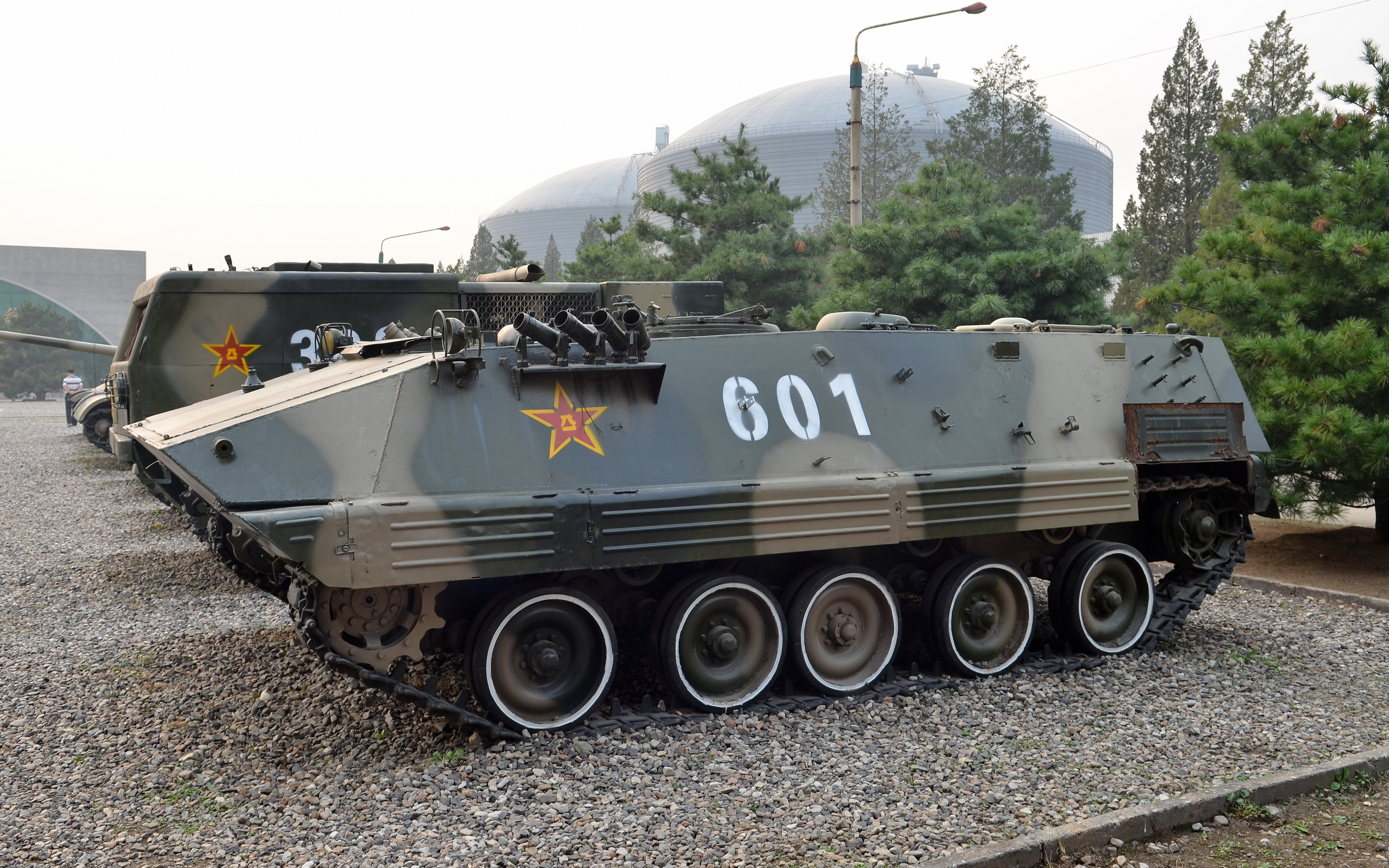
Type 85 armored personnel carrier, Changping Museum, Beijing.

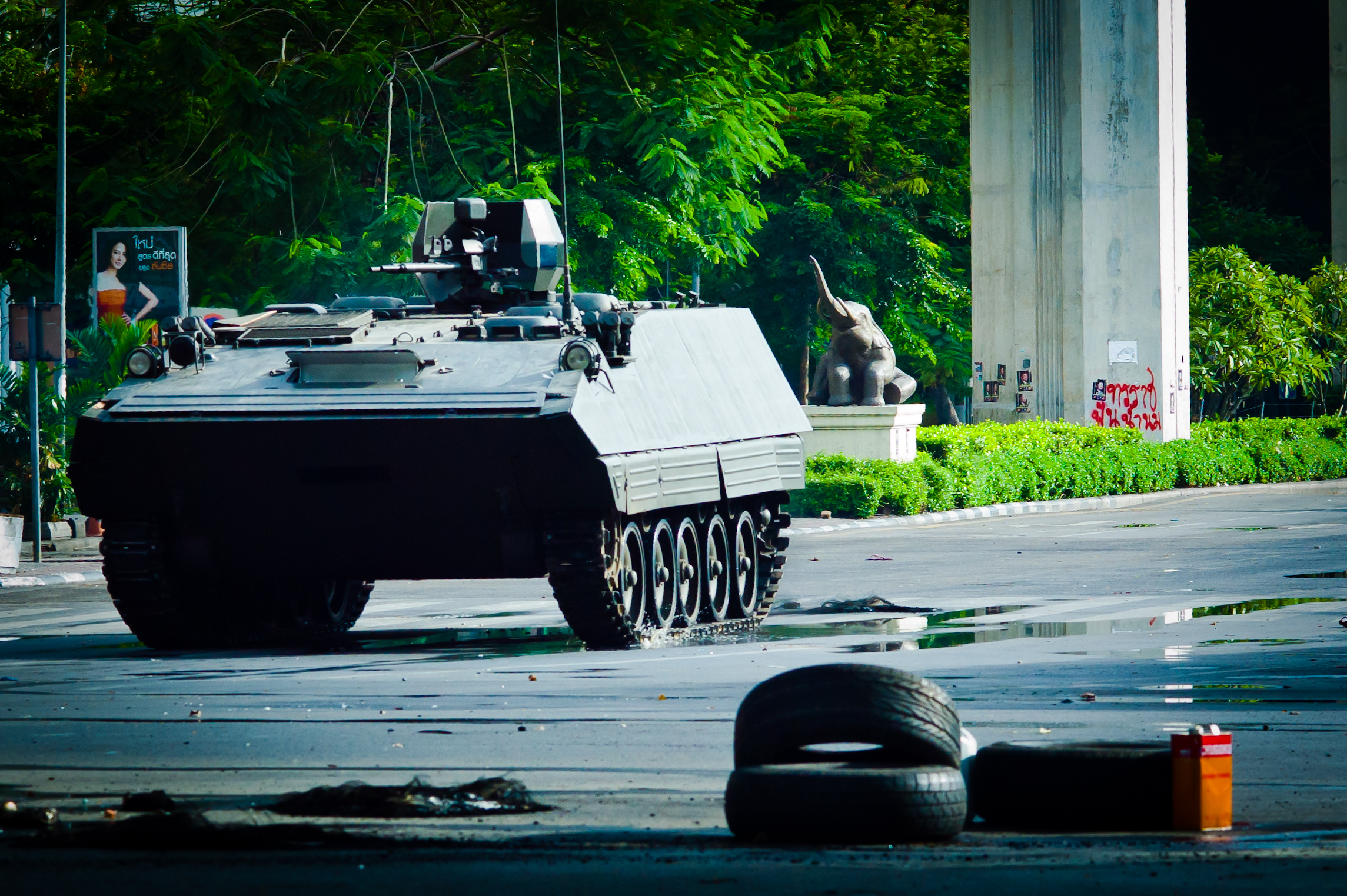
A Thai Type-85 AFV.

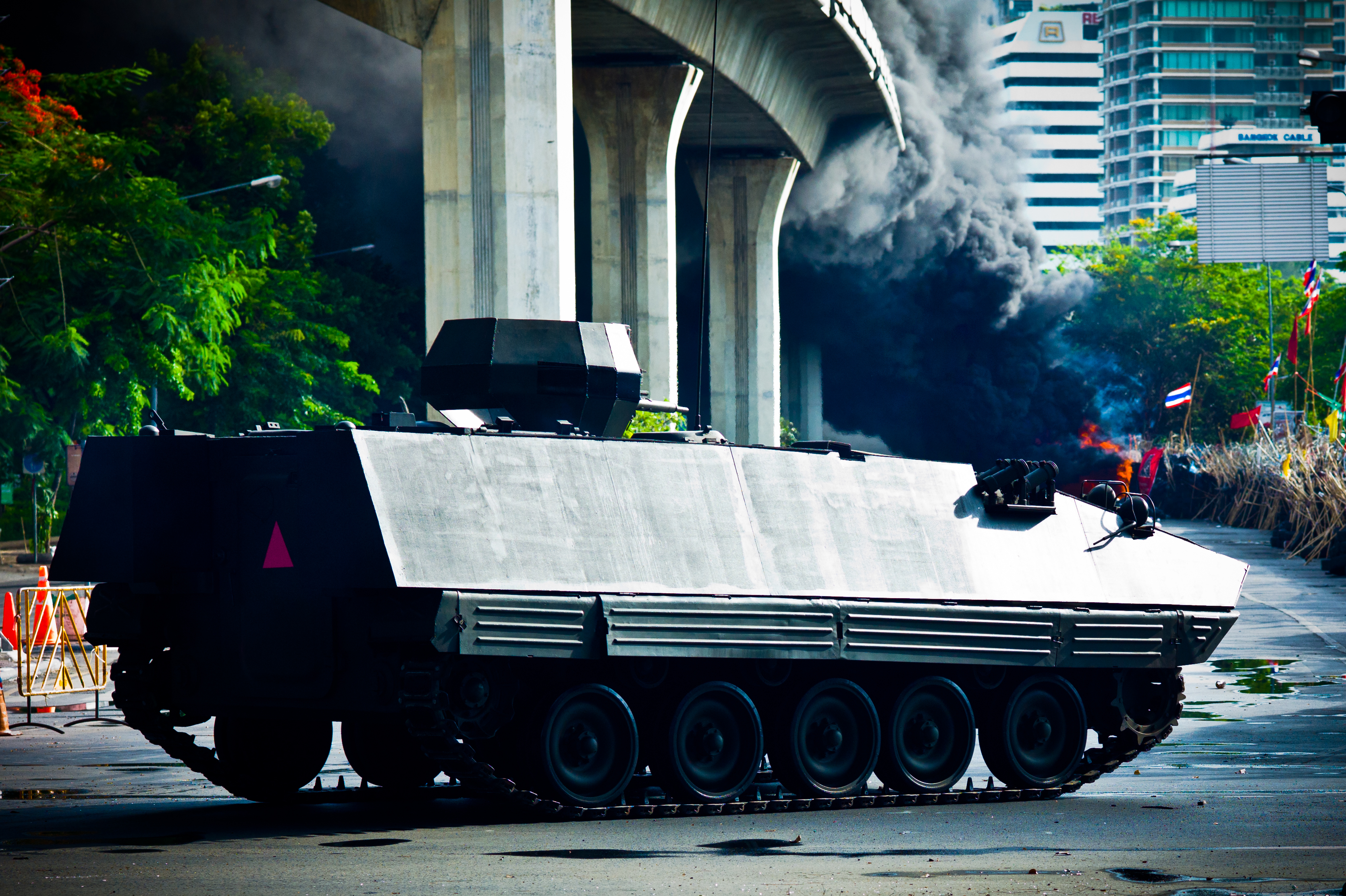
A Thai Type-85 AFV.

- Type 85 Tracked Armoured Personnel Carrier or Type YW531H - Basic version, as described.
- Type 85 Infantry Fighting Vehicle or Type YW307 - Fitted with a one-man turret with 25 mm automatic gun (400 rounds) and 7.62 mm coaxial machine gun (1,000 rounds). Crew: 3+7. A very similar vehicle with the same name but based on the Type 89 AFV chassis does also exist.
- Type 85 Infantry Fighting Vehicle or Type YW309 - Fitted with the complete turret of the WZ501 with the 73 mm gun. Crew: 3+8.
- Type 85 Armoured Command Vehicle - Retains the basic low-profile hull, but has some of the periscopes removed. Specialised equipment consist of a generator and radio sets Type 889 (or VRC-83), Type 892 (or VRC-84) and receiver Type 70-2B (or SR119).
- Type 85 Armoured Command Post - Has a higher roofline and is equipped with a generator and radio sets Type 889 (or VRC-83), Type 892 (or VRC-84) and receiver Type 70-2B (or SR119). This variant also serves as the basis for the command vehicles of Norinco's PLZ-45 self-propelled gun-howitzer system: the GLC-45 battery reconnaissance vehicle, the ZSY-45 battalion command post vehicle and the ZCL-45 battery command post vehicle.
- Type 85 Tracked Armoured Ambulance or Type WZ751 - Unarmed ambulance with a higher roofline.
- Type 85 Maintenance Engineering Vehicle - Maintenance variant with higher troop compartment, fitted with a light crane and a generator.
- Type 85 Recovery Vehicle - Has a slightly wider hull and is equipped with a 1-tonne crane, generator and welding equipment. Armed with a 12.7mm machine gun.
- Type 85 Self-Propelled Howitzer 122mm or Type YW323 - Turret-less version with a Type 85 122mm howitzer mounted on top of the semi-open rear hull. 40 rounds of ammunition are provided. Crew: driver, commander and 6-men gun crew.
- Type 85 Self-Propelled Artillery Rocket Launcher or Type YW306 - Variant with a 30-round 130 mm rocket launcher mounted on top of the hull. A total of 60 rockets is carried on board. Crew: 6.
- Type 85 Self-Propelled Mortar 120mm or Type YW381 - With a 120 mm mortar and 50 rounds in the hull rear. The mortar is fired through a big circular opening in the hull roof.
- Type 85 Self-Propelled Mortar 82mm or Type YW304 - With a Type 87 82 mm mortar mounted in the rear hull and 120 rounds of ammunition.
- HJ-62C armoured scout vehicle - turret-less variant with a battlefield surveillance radar.
- Type YD804 - Civilian fire-fighting version.

=== Proposed variants ===
- 120mm Turret-Mounted Mortar - with a BAE Systems/RO Defence 120 mm Armoured Mortar System.
- NVH-1 - Infantry fighting vehicle with 2-man Vickers turret, armed with a 30 mm RARDEN gun and 210 rounds. Combat weight: 16 tonnes, crew: 11 man. Never entered production.
- NVH-4 - Similar as the above, but armed with a 25mm Bushmaster gun. Combat weight: 17 tonnes, crew: 13 man.
- Anti-Tank - self-propelled gun with 105 mm anti-tank gun to be exported
- 30mm remote weapons station - upgraded variant with a 30 mm remote weapons station

== Operators ==
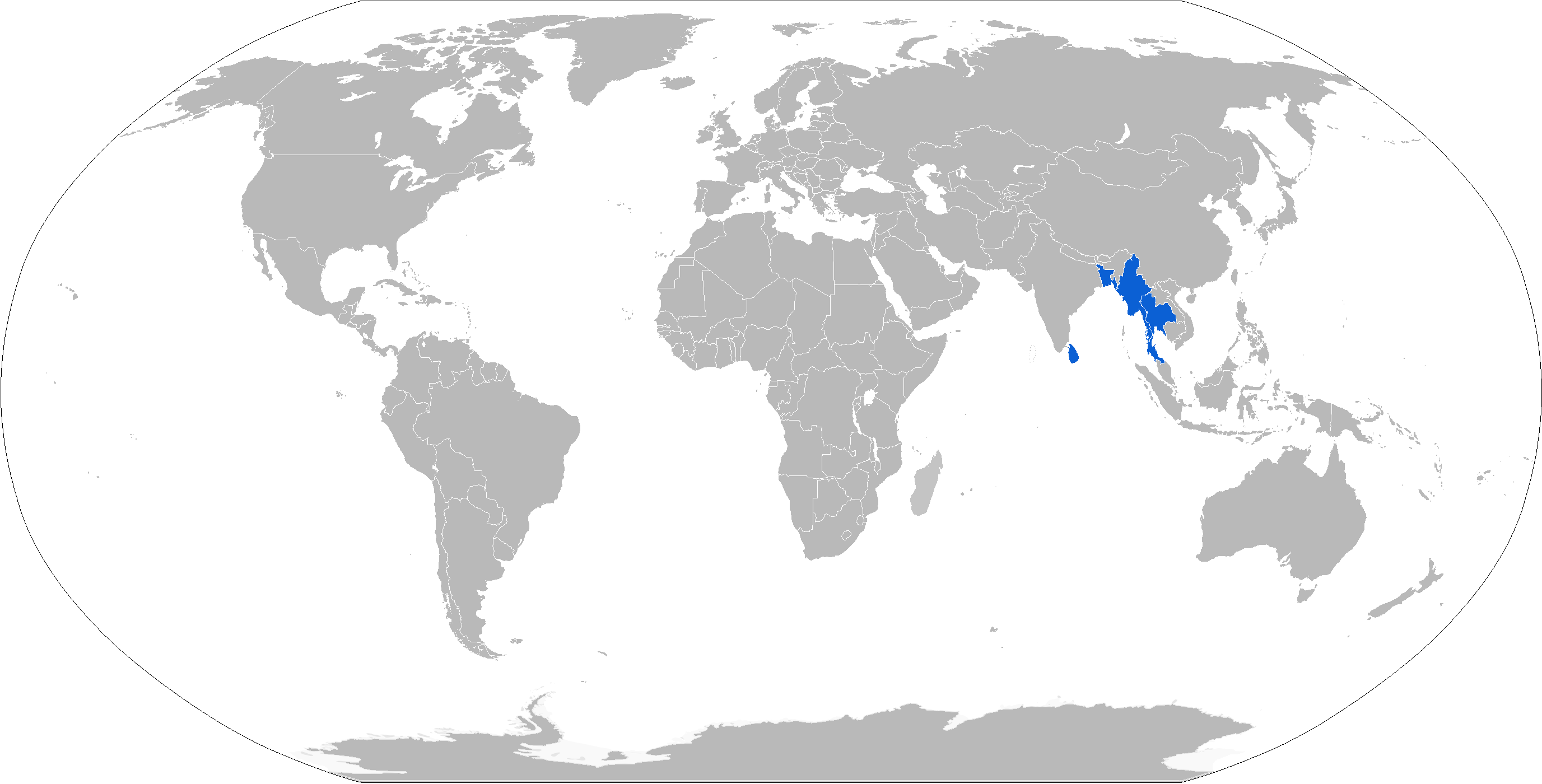
Map of Type 85 operators in blue

- Bangladesh: 50 delivered from 1989
- Myanmar:200 received in 1990 and 250 received in 1993.
- Nigeria
- North Korea
- Sri Lanka: Consist of Type 85s with 12.7 machine gun turrets and 73mm cannon turrets.
- Thailand: 410 YW 531H APCs delivered from 1987. Including APC, ACV, SPM and SPRL
- Zimbabwe: Including MEV

== Bibliography ==
- Fontanellaz, Adrien (2020). Paradise Afire Volume 3: The Sri Lankan War 1990-1994. Helion & Company. ISBN 978-1913118624.
