= Saurs =

Saurs may refer to:

- Bruce Saurs (died 2014), former owner of American ice-hockey team Peoria Rivermen (IHL)
- Château de Saurs, French vineyard
- Gineste de Saurs, family of French wine-producers

== See also ==
- Saur (disambiguation)
