= TAB (armoured personnel carrier) =

TAB (Romanian: Transportor Amfibiu Blindat, translated Amphibious Armoured Personnel Carrier) is the Romanian military designation of armoured personnel carriers. The TAB APCs were based on the Russian BTR series until the early 1990s, with several improvements, including better diesel engines. After 1990, new TAB designs have been developed, such as the RN-94 and the Saur series, but none of these designs entered mass production.

== Models ==
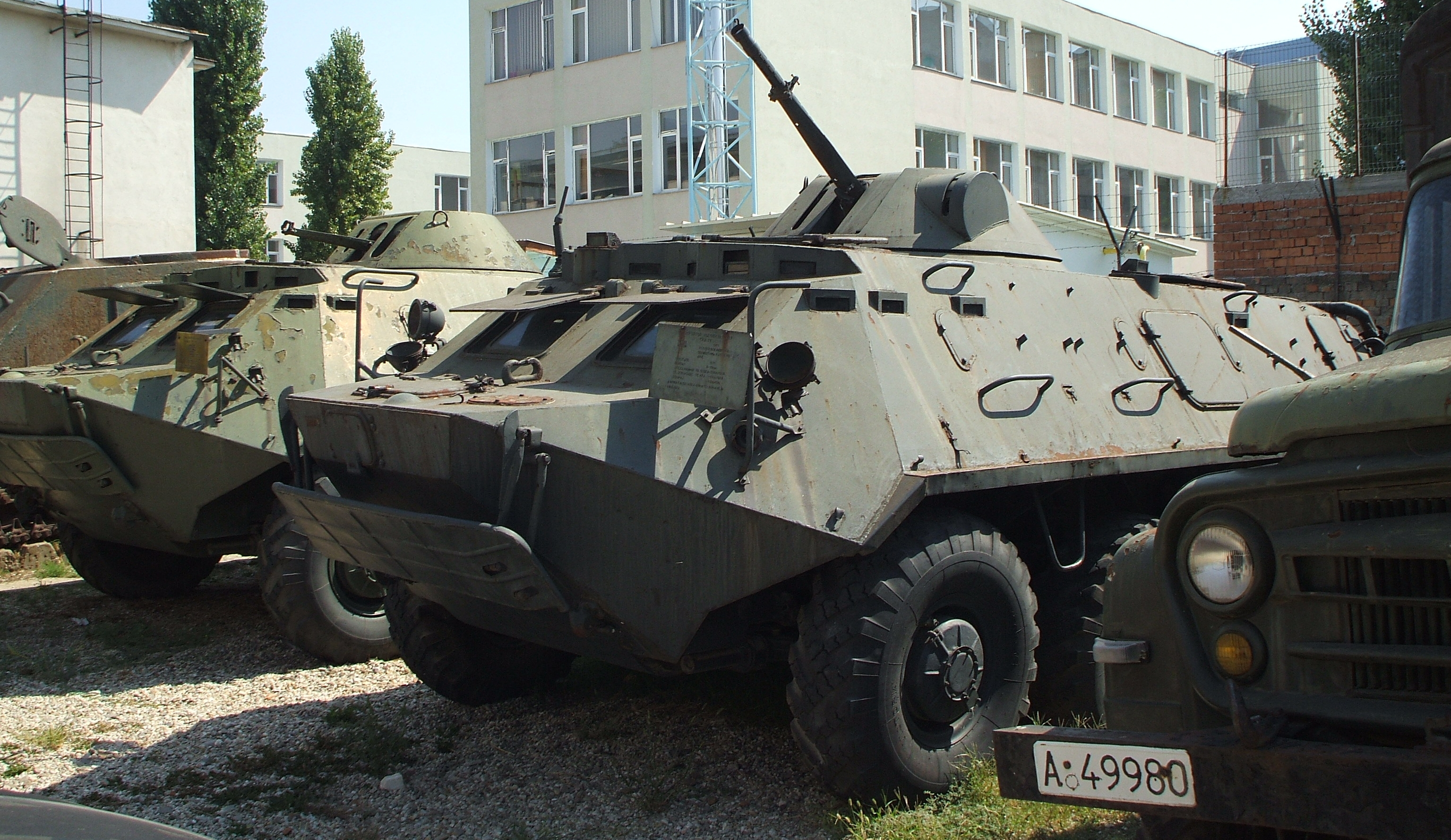
A Soviet BTR-60PB APC (left) and a Romanian TAB-71 APC (right) on display at "King Ferdinand" National Military Museum in Bucharest.

- TAB-63 - prototype, predecessor of TAB-71
- TAB-71 - based on BTR-60. 1872 copies manufactured. In 2010, Romania owned 846 TAB-71 transporters, 375 being in use. 161 were transferred to Moldova and 20 to Ukraine.
- TAB-77 - based on BTR-70
- TABC-79 - 4×4 version of TAB-77
- B-33 Zimbru - based on BTR-80
- RN-94 - a joint Romanian-Turkish design, small numbers of the MEDEVAC version were delivered to Bangladesh (6×6 version)
- Zimbru 2000 - proposed upgrade of B-33 Zimbru (prototype)
- Saur 1 - prototype, 8×8
- Saur 2 - prototype, 8×8
- Saur 3 - proposed design, 8×8
- Saur 4x4 - proposed design, 4×4

== Gallery ==
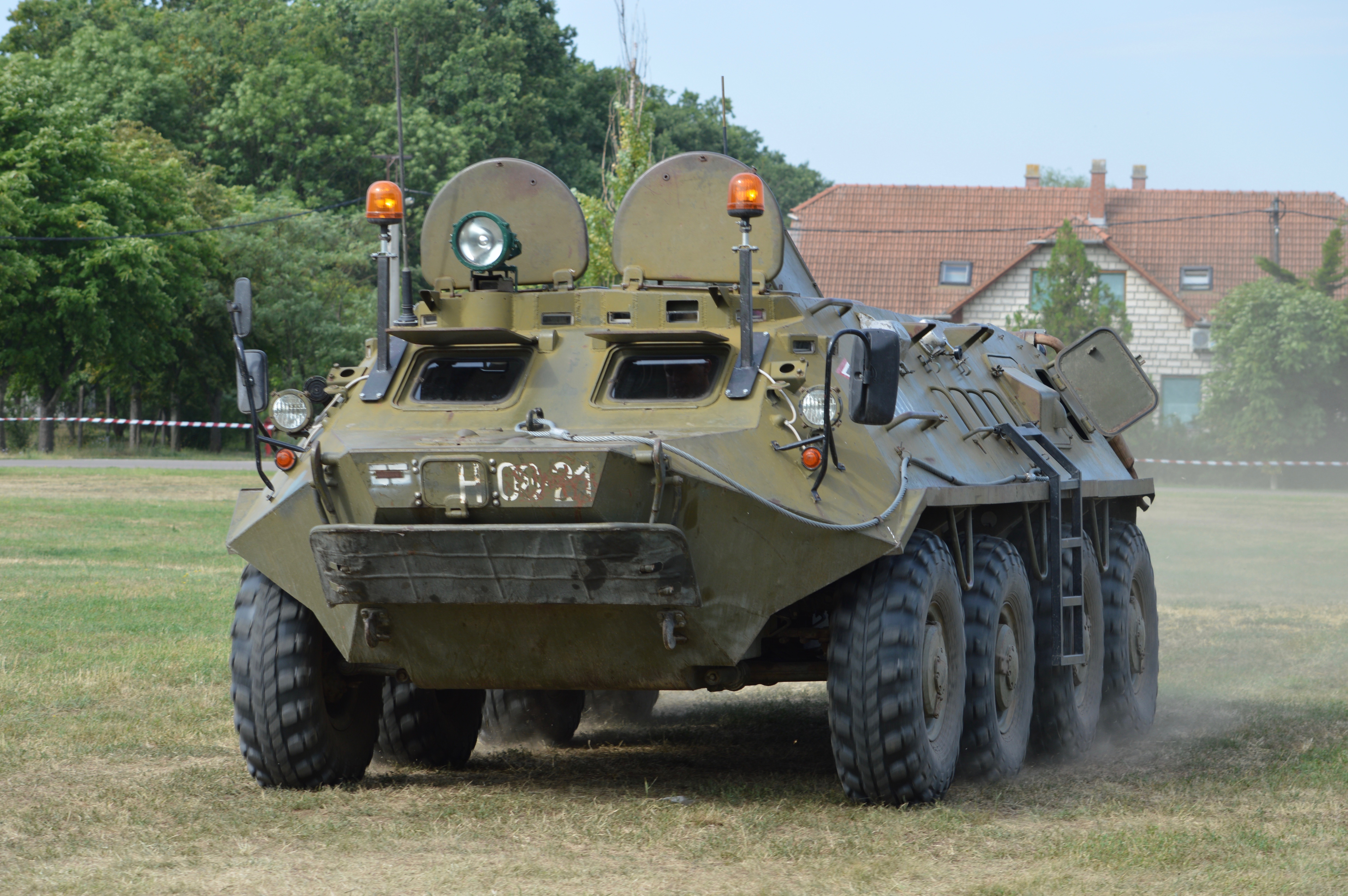
TAB-63

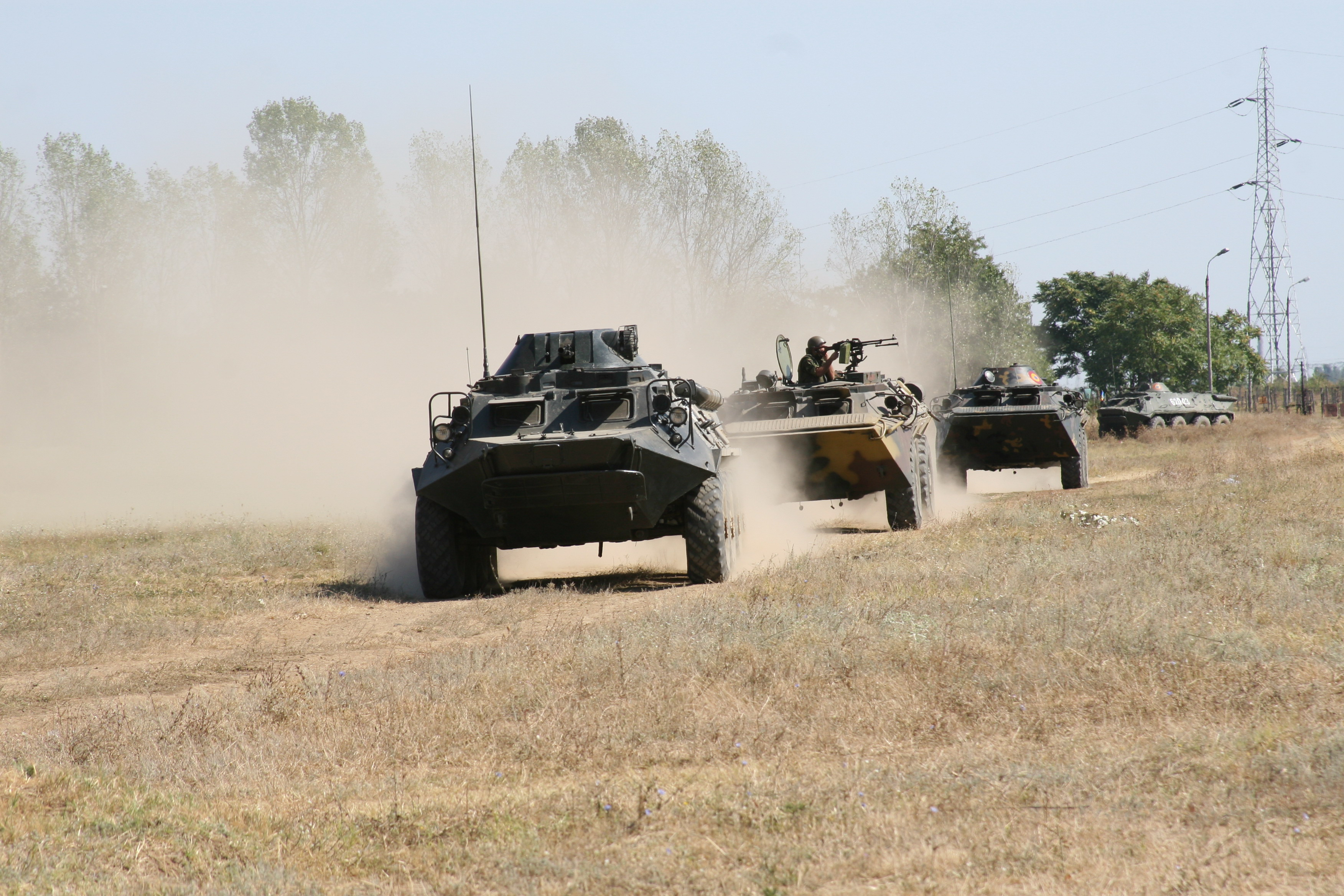
TAB-71M

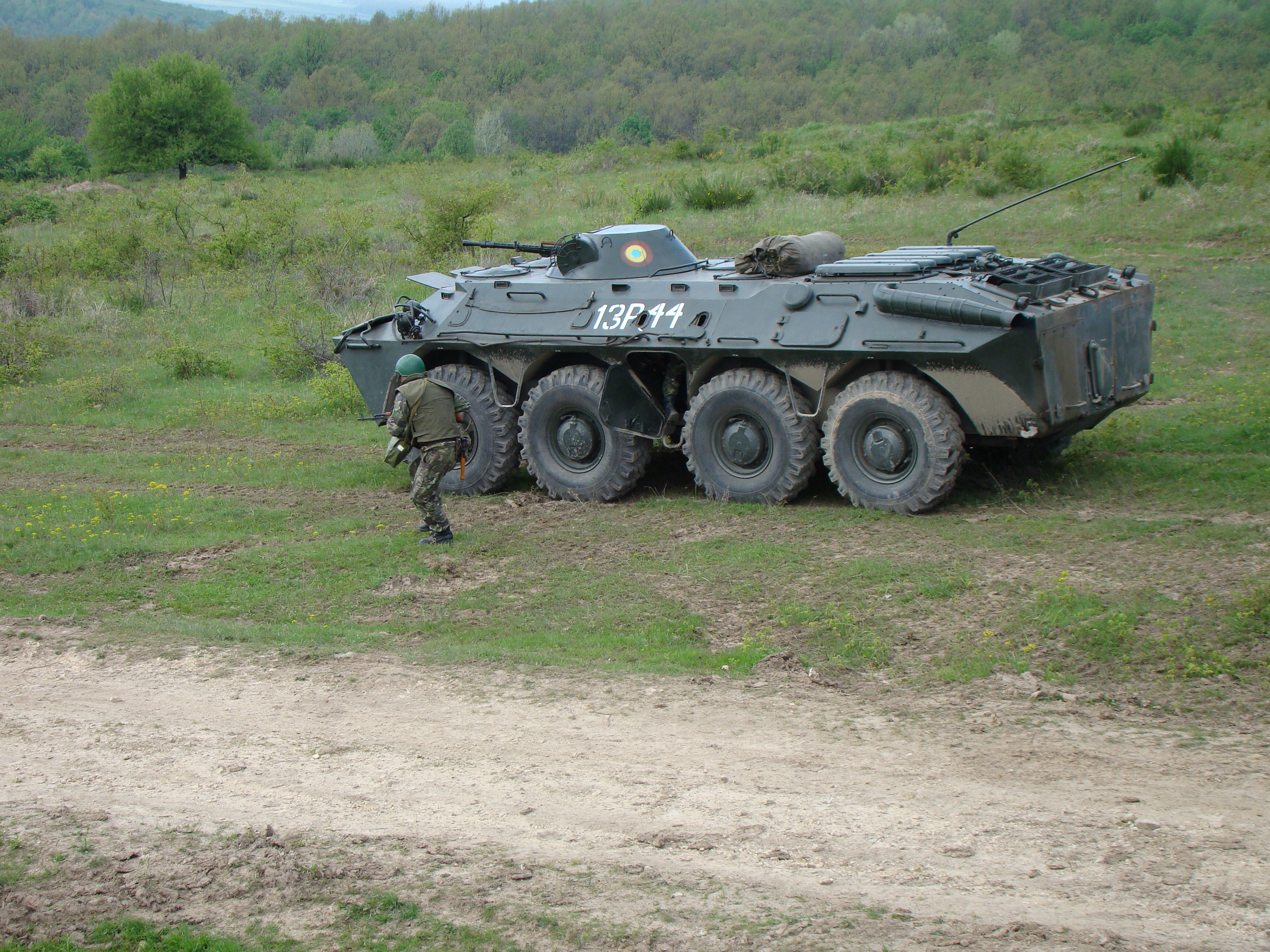
TAB-77

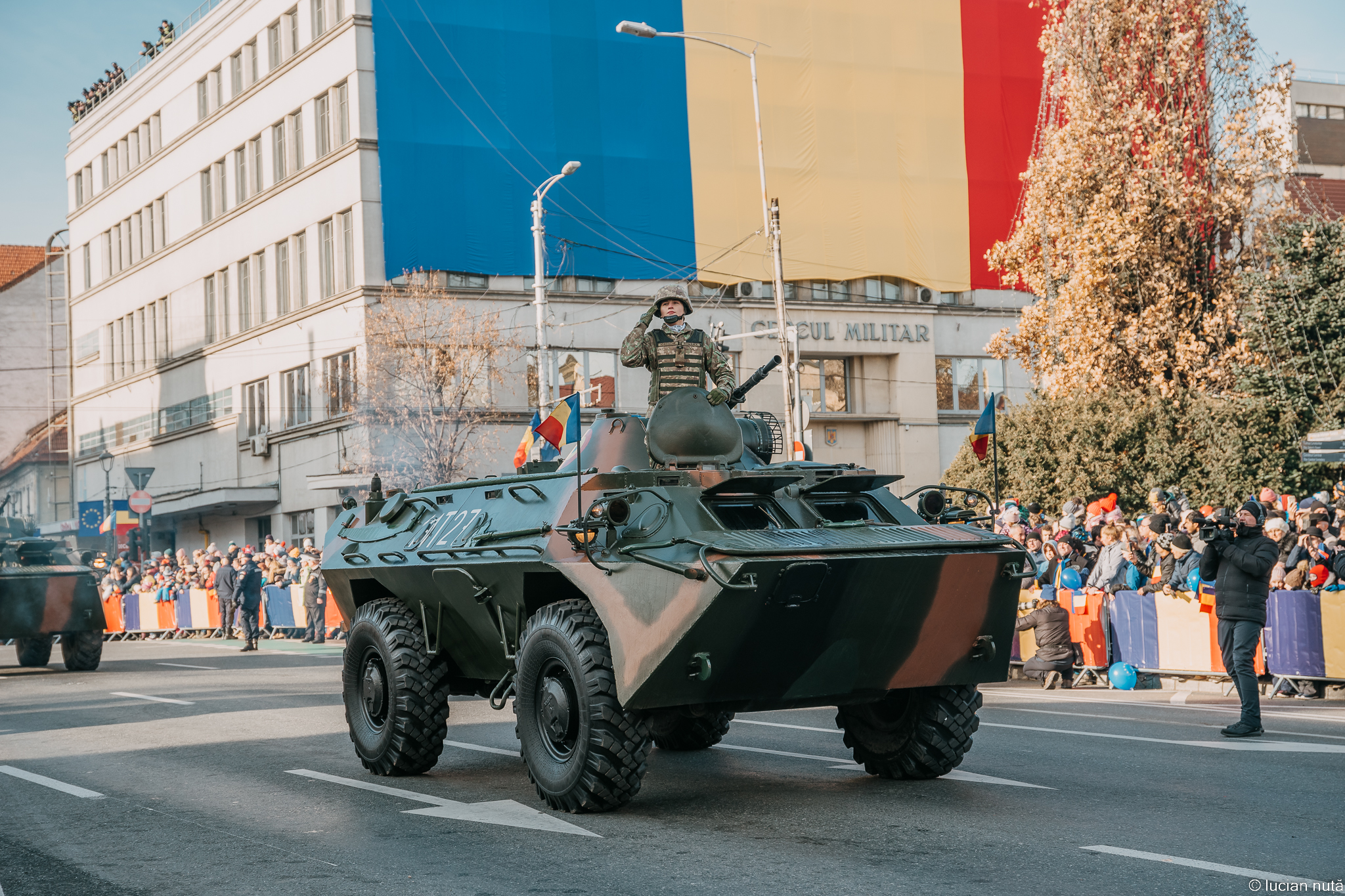
TABC-79

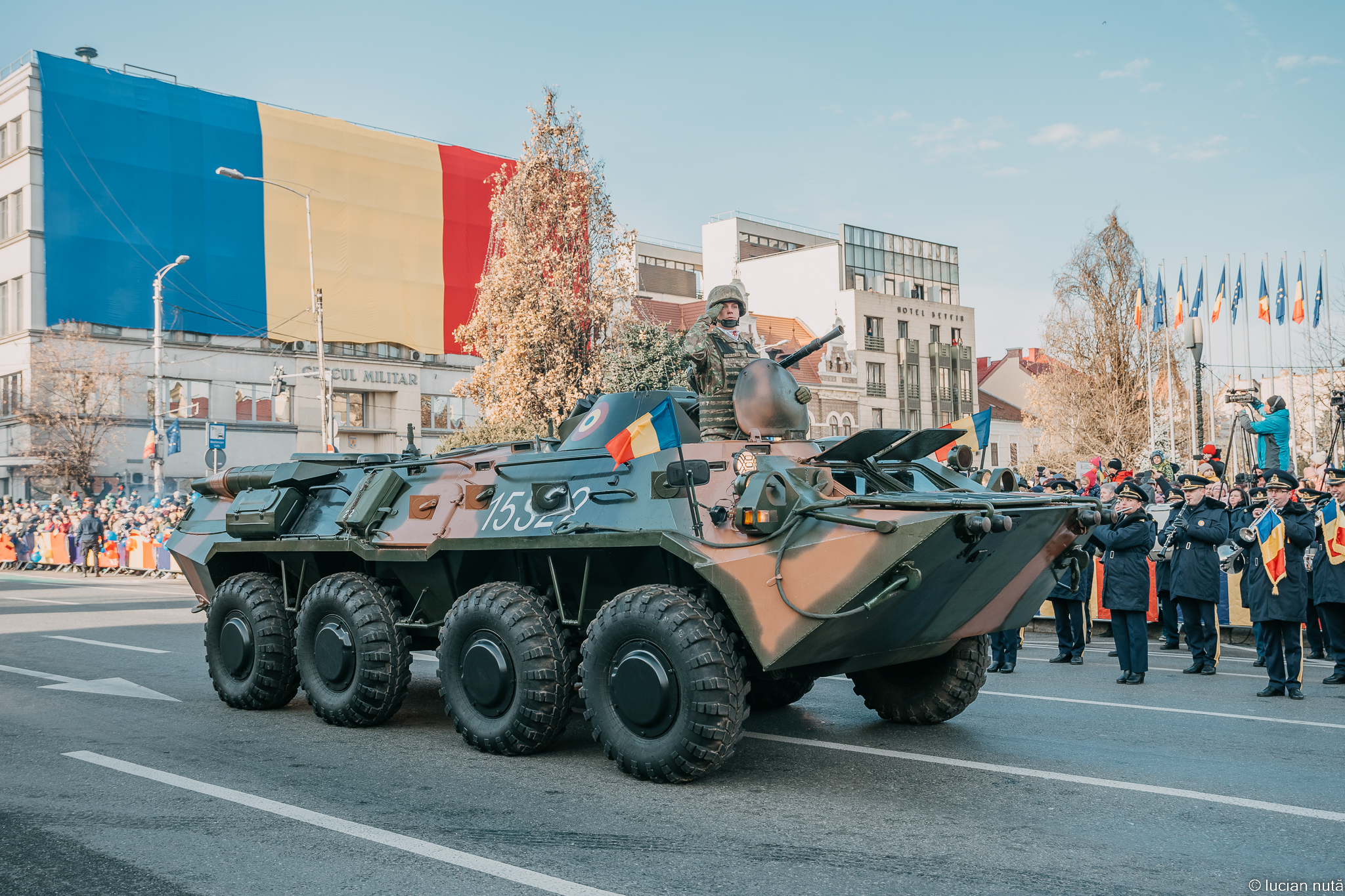
TAB B-33 Zimbru

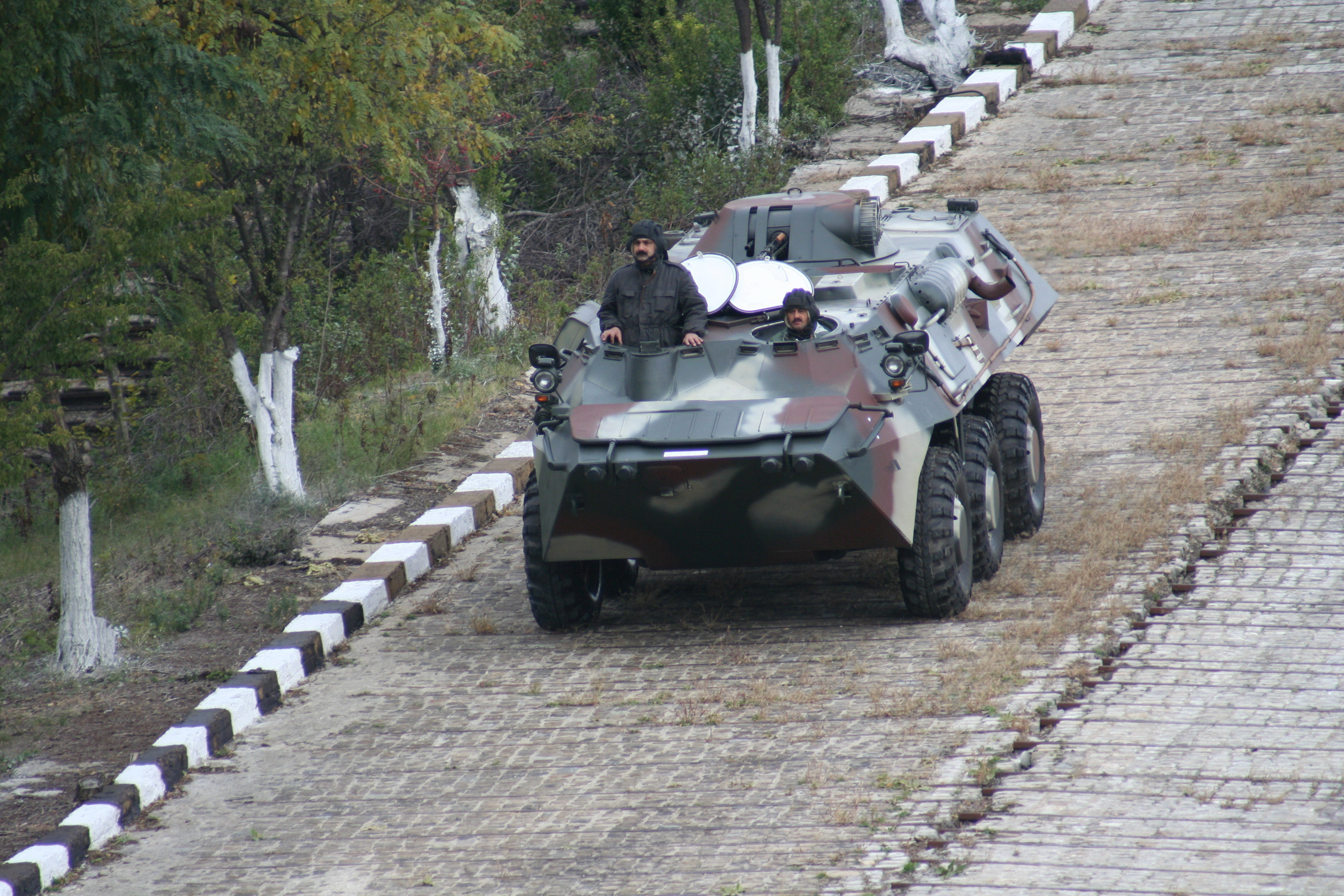
RN-94

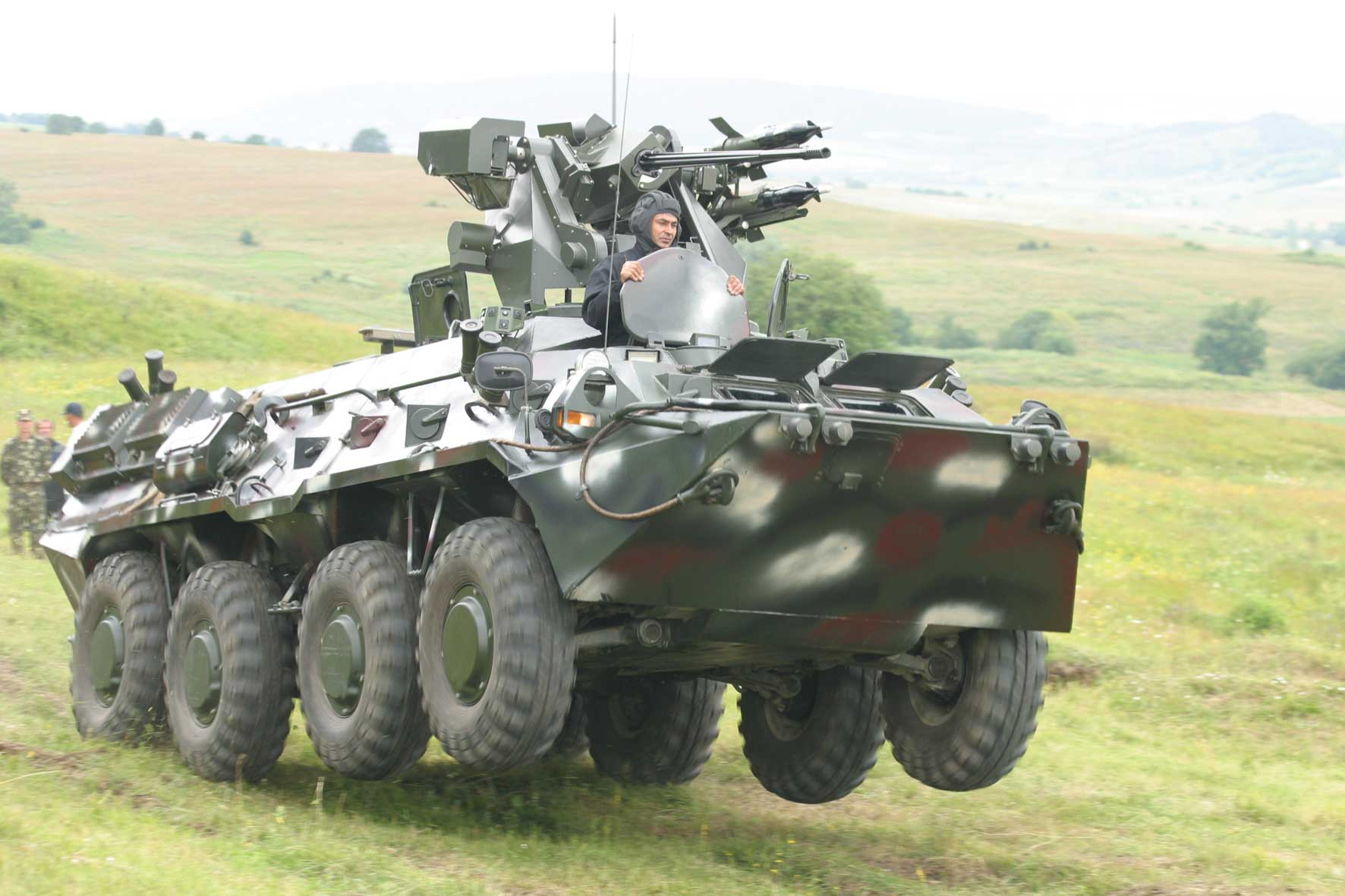
Zimbru 2000

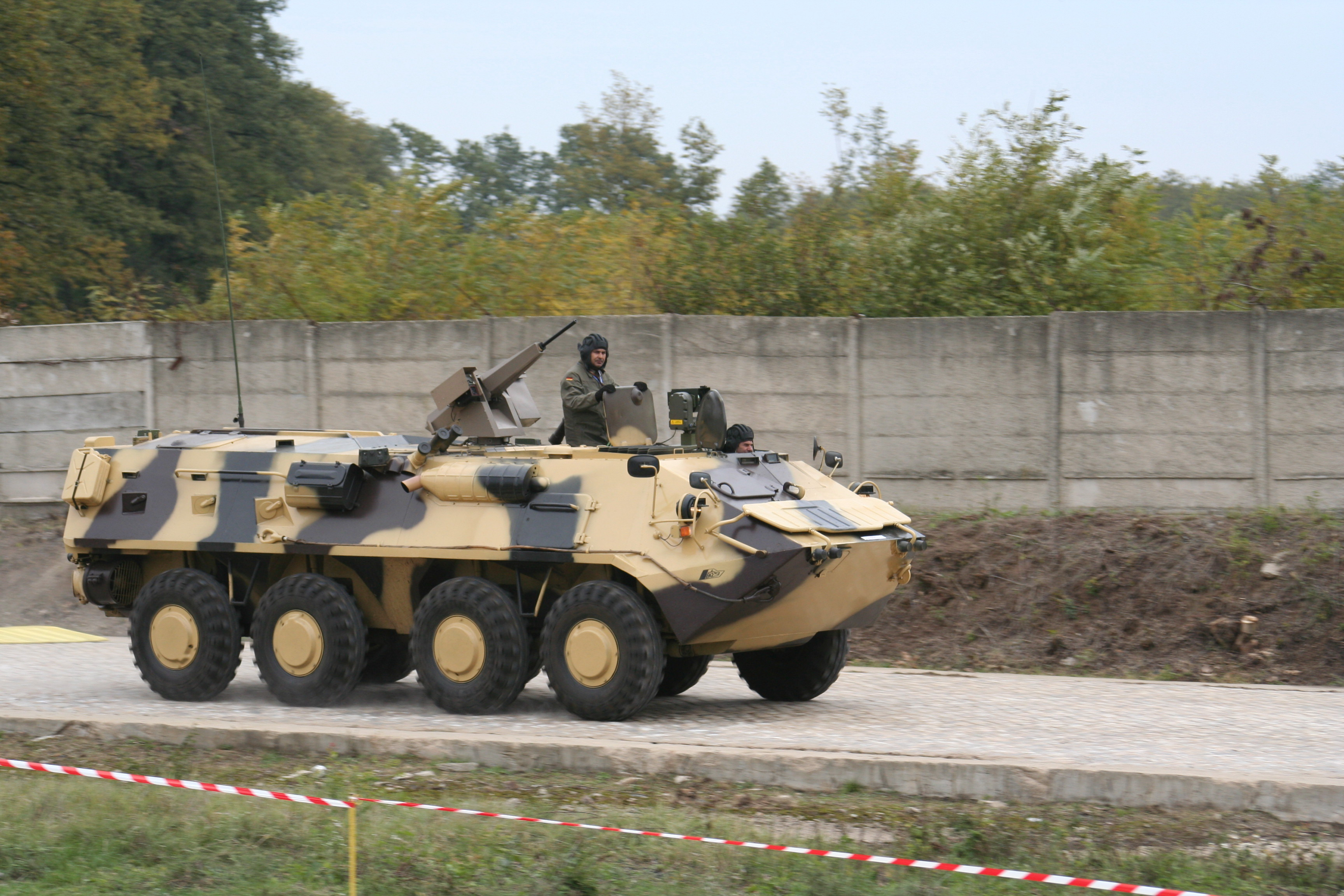
Saur 1

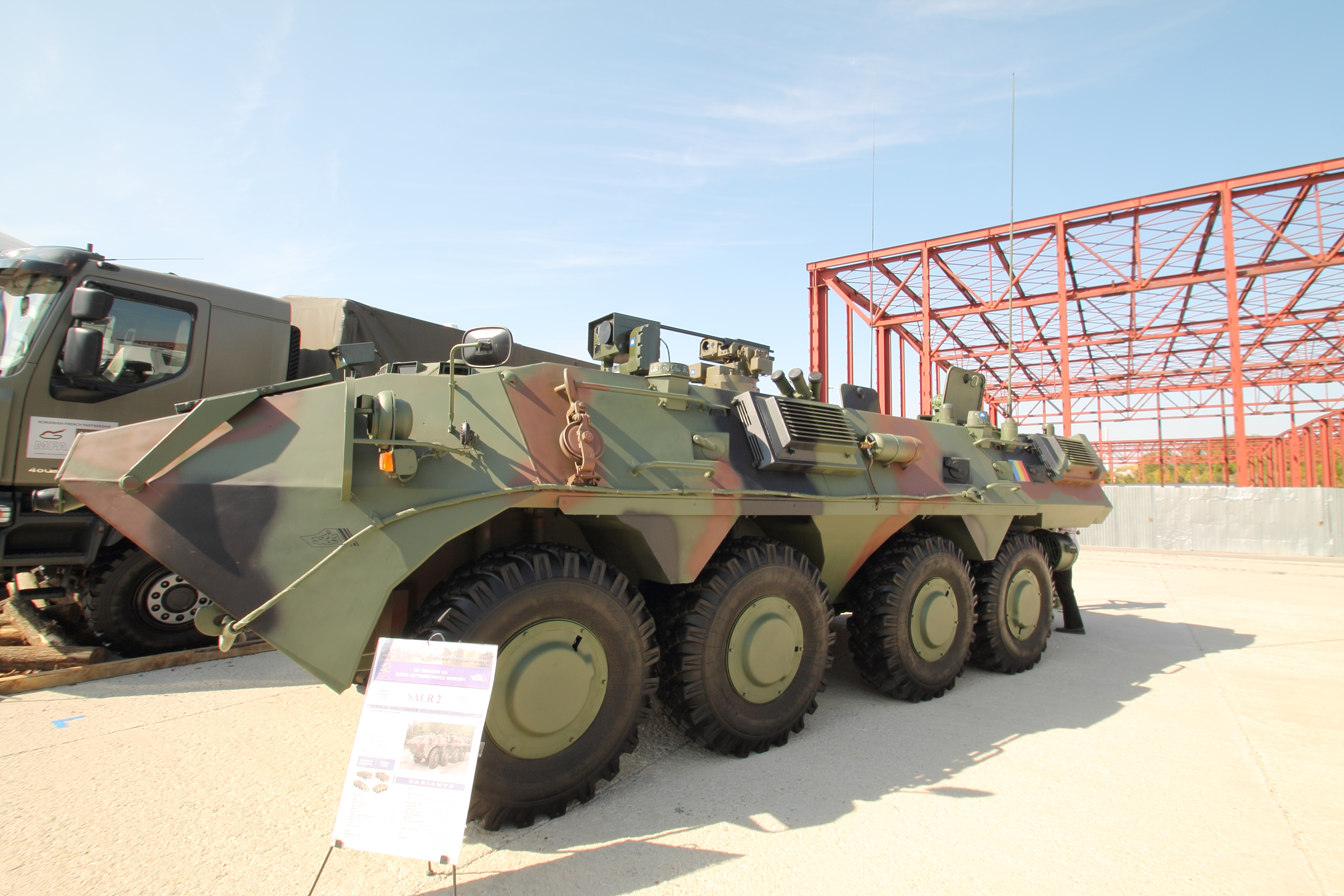
Saur 2

== Notes and references ==
Notes

References

- Foss, Christopher F. (2005). Jane's Armour and Artillery 2005-2006. Jane's Information Group. ISBN 978-0-7106-2686-8.
- Bishop, Chris (2006). The Encyclopedia of Tanks and Armored fighting vehicles: From World War I to The Present Day. Grange Book. ISBN 978-1-59223-626-8.
- O'Malley, T. J., Hutchins, Ray (1996). Fighting Vehicles: Armoured Personnel Carriers & Infantry Fighting Vehicles. Greenhill Books. ISBN 1-85367-211-4.
