= Café de Paris sauce =

Butter-based sauce

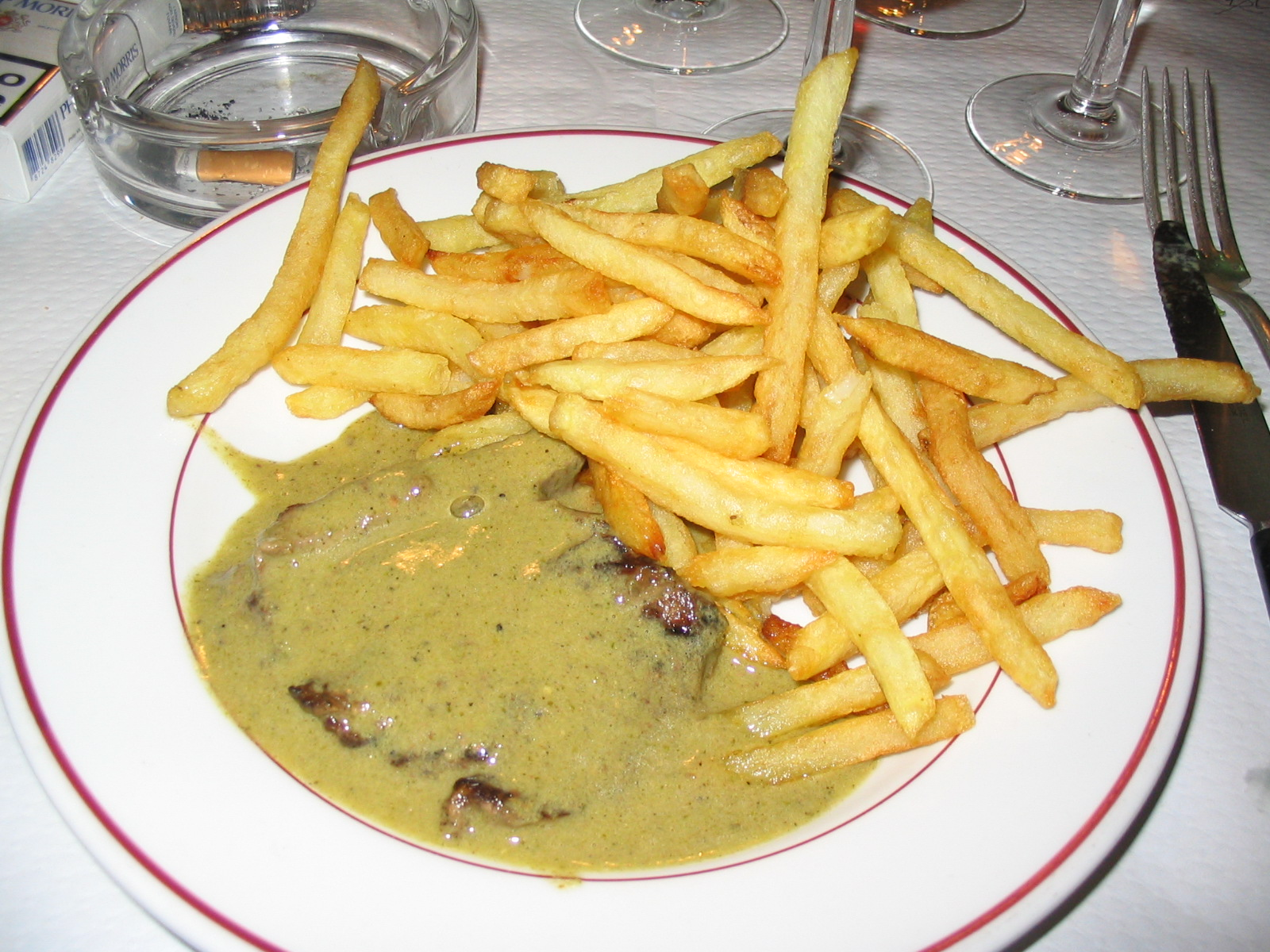
An "entrecôte Café de Paris"

Café de Paris Sauce is a butter-based sauce.

The sauce is named after the restaurant where it was created, the Café de Paris in Geneva, Switzerland.

== History ==
The sauce was popularised in the 1930s by the Café de Paris restaurant in Geneva, then owned by Arthur-François (Freddy) Dumont, and entrecôte Café de Paris remains the restaurant's speciality. The Café de Paris attributes the origin of the sauce to Mr Dumont's father-in-law, Mr Boubier.

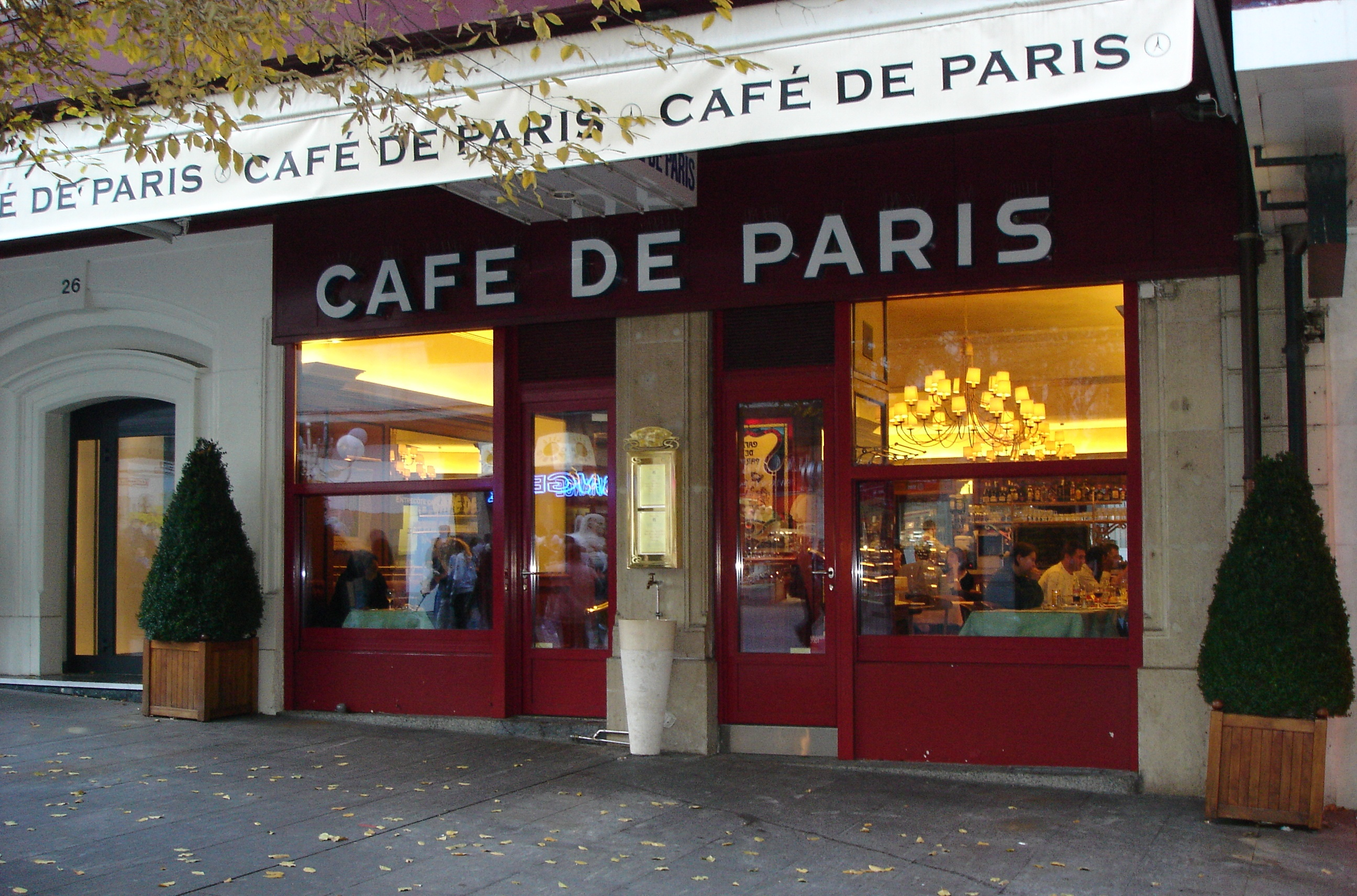
The Café de Paris on the rue du Mont-Blanc in Geneva, Switzerland, where the sauce and its entrecôte dish were first created

A closely similar sauce is also served by the Entrecôte groups of restaurants operated by the descendants of Paul Gineste de Saurs in Paris, Geneva, Toulouse, Lyon, Madrid, London, New York, Beirut, Doha, Dubai, Riyadh, and other cities.

== Ingredients and preparation ==
The Paris newspaper Le Monde reports that the sauce as served by Le Relais de Venise – L'Entrecôte is made from poultry livers, fresh thyme and thyme flowers, full cream (19 percent butterfat), white Dijon mustard, butter, water, salt, and pepper.

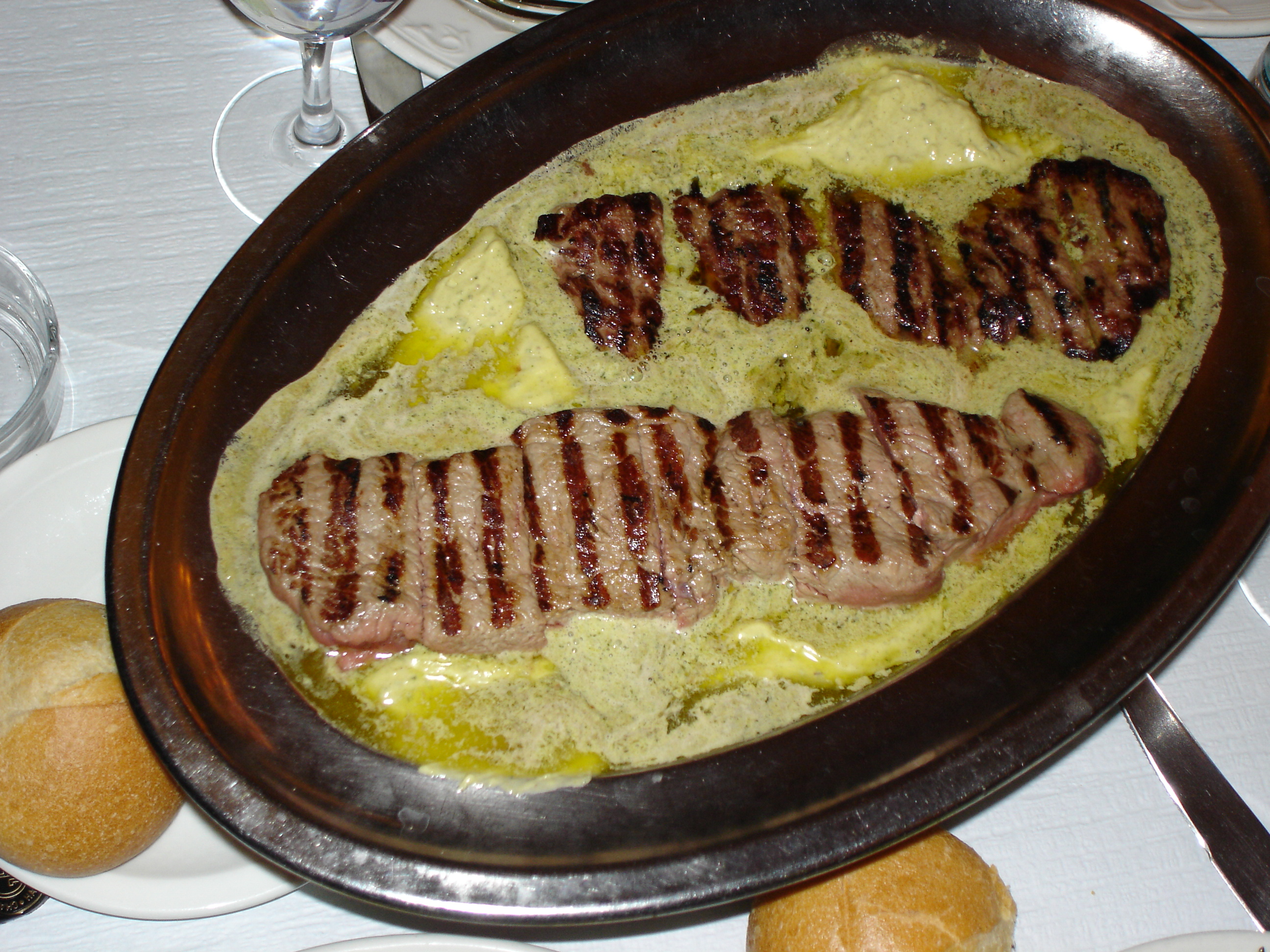
Two servings of entrecôte Café de Paris, one rare and one well done

According to Le Monde, the recipe involves heating one pan with the livers and thyme until they start to change colour. In a second pan, the cream is reduced on low heat with the mustard and infused with the flavour of the thyme flowers. It is then blended and pressed through a fine strainer into the reduced cream. As the sauce thickens, the butter is incorporated into it with a little water, it is beaten smooth, and fresh-ground salt and pepper are added. The London newspaper The Independent, however, reports that the proprietor of Le Relais de Venise – L'Entrecôte has dismissed the Le Monde report as inaccurate.

== See also ==
- L'Entrecôte
- List of sauces
- Steak frites
