= Saur =

Saur may refer to:

- Saur (company) a French utility company
- Saur (restaurant), Michelin starred restaurant in The Hague, Netherlands
- Dog king - a Scandinavian tradition
- Saur 1 - an APC developed by ROMARM
- K. G. Saur Verlag, German publisher
- Saur Revolution, 1978 event in Afghanistan
- "-saur", a suffix used in taxonomy to describe reptiles, particularly dinosaurs
- Saurashtra script (ISO 15924 code)

== Places ==
- Saur, Iran, a village in South Khorasan Province, Iran
- Saur Mountains, in China and Kazakhstan
- Saur Bazar, a block in Saharsa, Bihar, India
- Saur Valley, a valley in Uttarakhand, India

== People with the surname ==
- Karl Saur (1902–1966), German State Secretary and founder of publishing house

== See also ==
- Saurs (disambiguation)
