= Steak frites =

Dish of steak accompanied by chipped potatoes

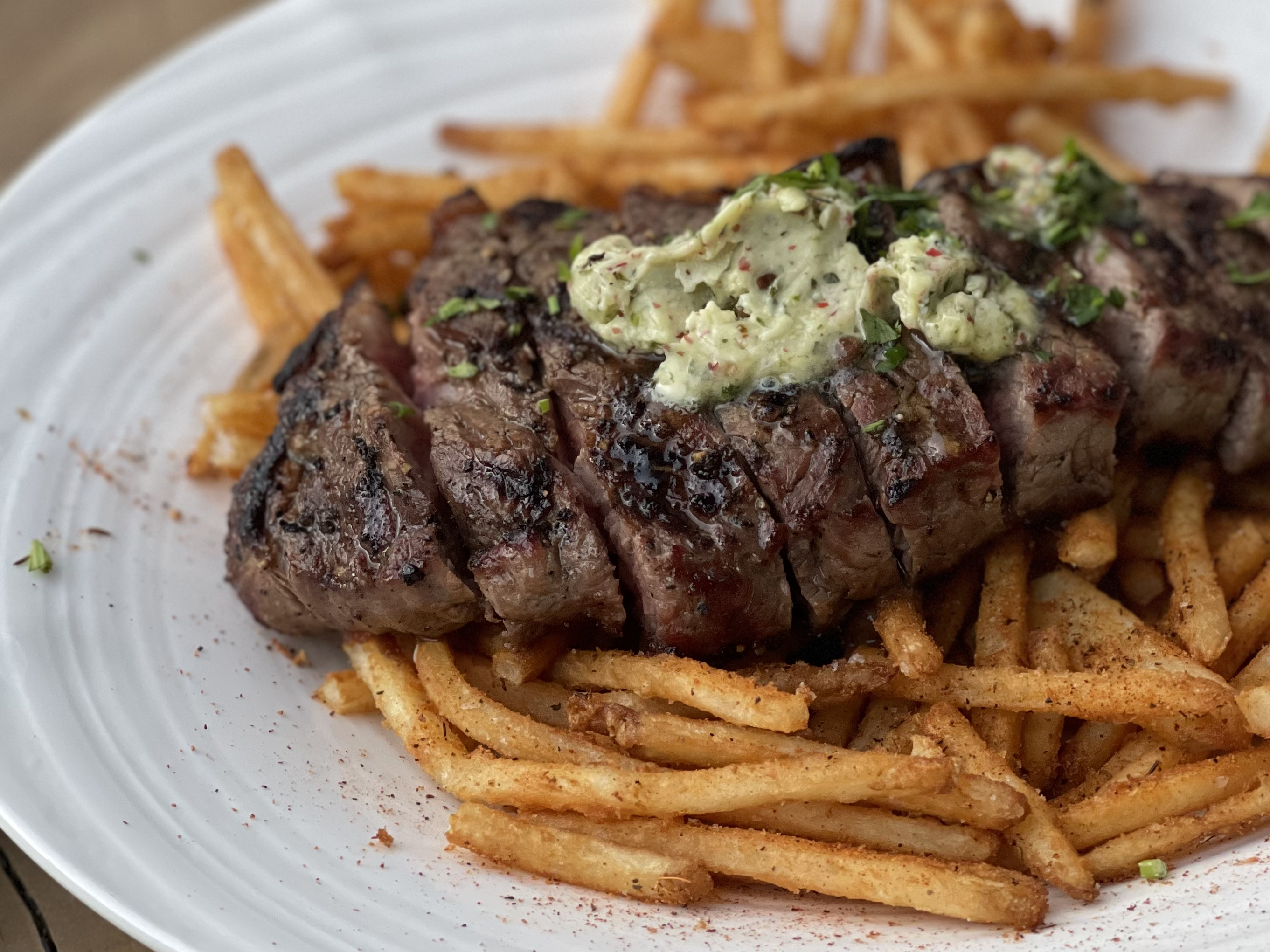
- Steak frites
- Type: Meat
- Course: Main course
- Place of origin: France
- Serving temperature: Hot
- Main ingredients: Steak, French fries, various sauces

Steak frites, (Note: "Steak-frites" is also known by a variety of other names in Flemish and French, such as "Bifteck-frites"; all with roughly the same meaning in translation.) meaning "steak [and] chipped potatoes" in French, is a dish consisting of beefsteak accompanied by fried chipped potatoes. It is commonly served in Belgian and French brasseries, and is considered by some to be the national dish of Belgium, which claims to be the country of origin.

Historically, rump steak was commonly used for this dish. Today, more commonly, the steak is an entrecôte also called rib eye, or scotch fillet (in Australia), pan-fried rare ("saignant"—literally "bloody"), in a pan reduction sauce, sometimes with hollandaise or béarnaise sauce, served with deep-fried potatoes.

Steak frites is the subject of a semiotic analysis by the French cultural theorist Roland Barthes in his 1957 work Mythologies.

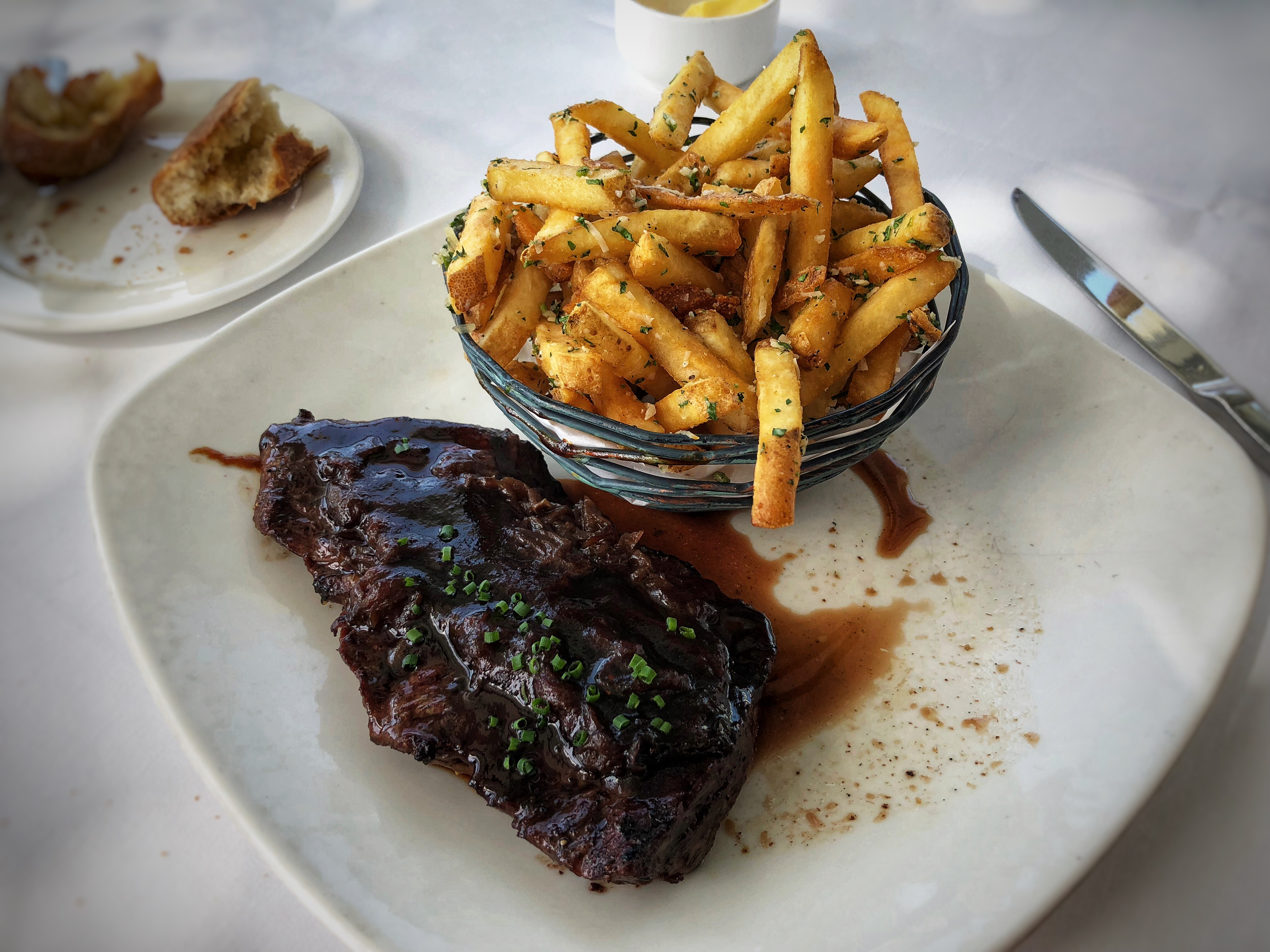
Steak frites prepared using flank steak, at a San Francisco, California restaurant

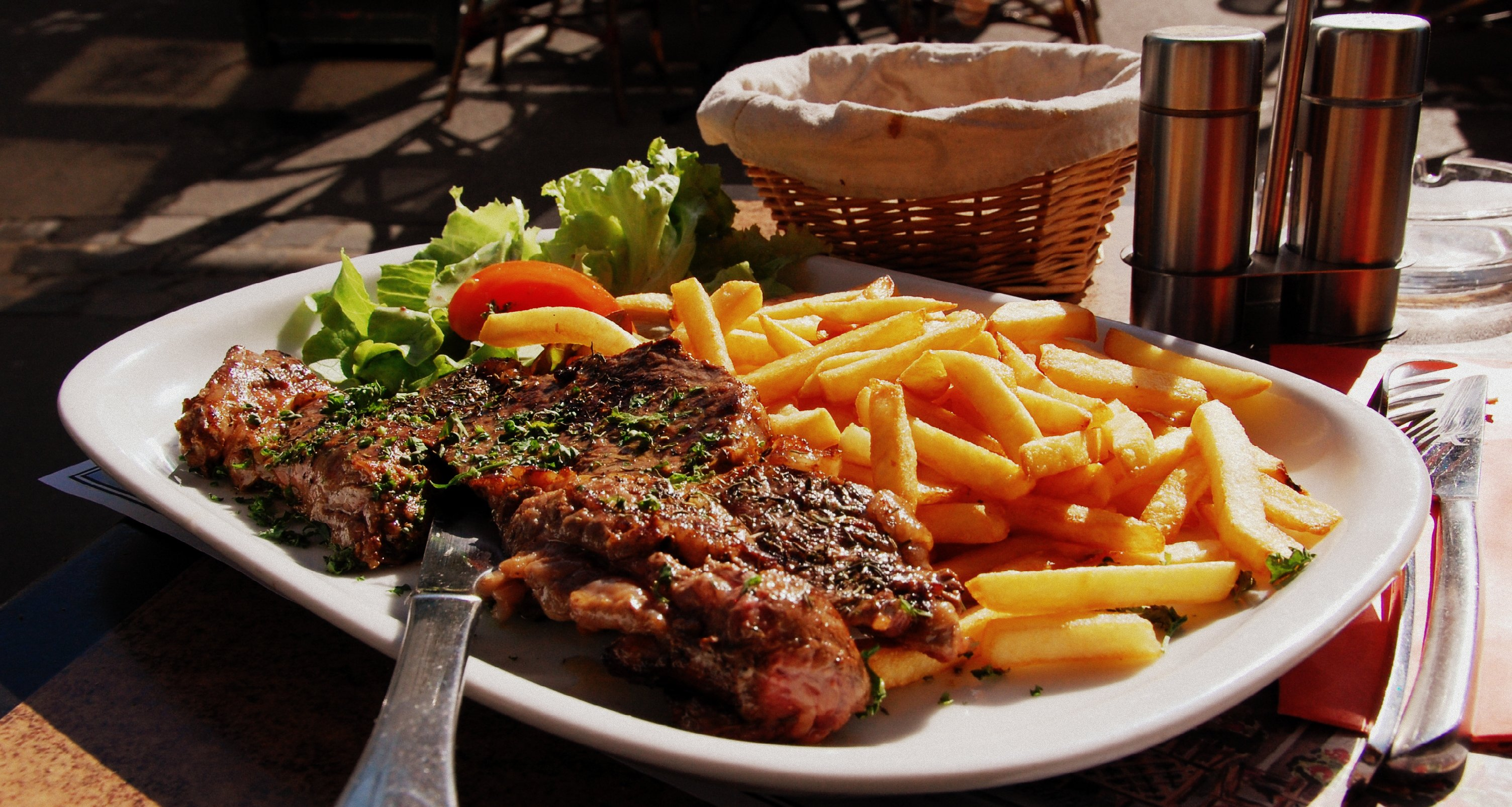
Steak frites in Fontainebleau, France

== See also ==
- Café de Paris sauce
- Moules-frites
- L'Entrecôte
- Brasserie
- List of meat and potato dishes
