= L'Entrecôte =

Name of several restaurant chains

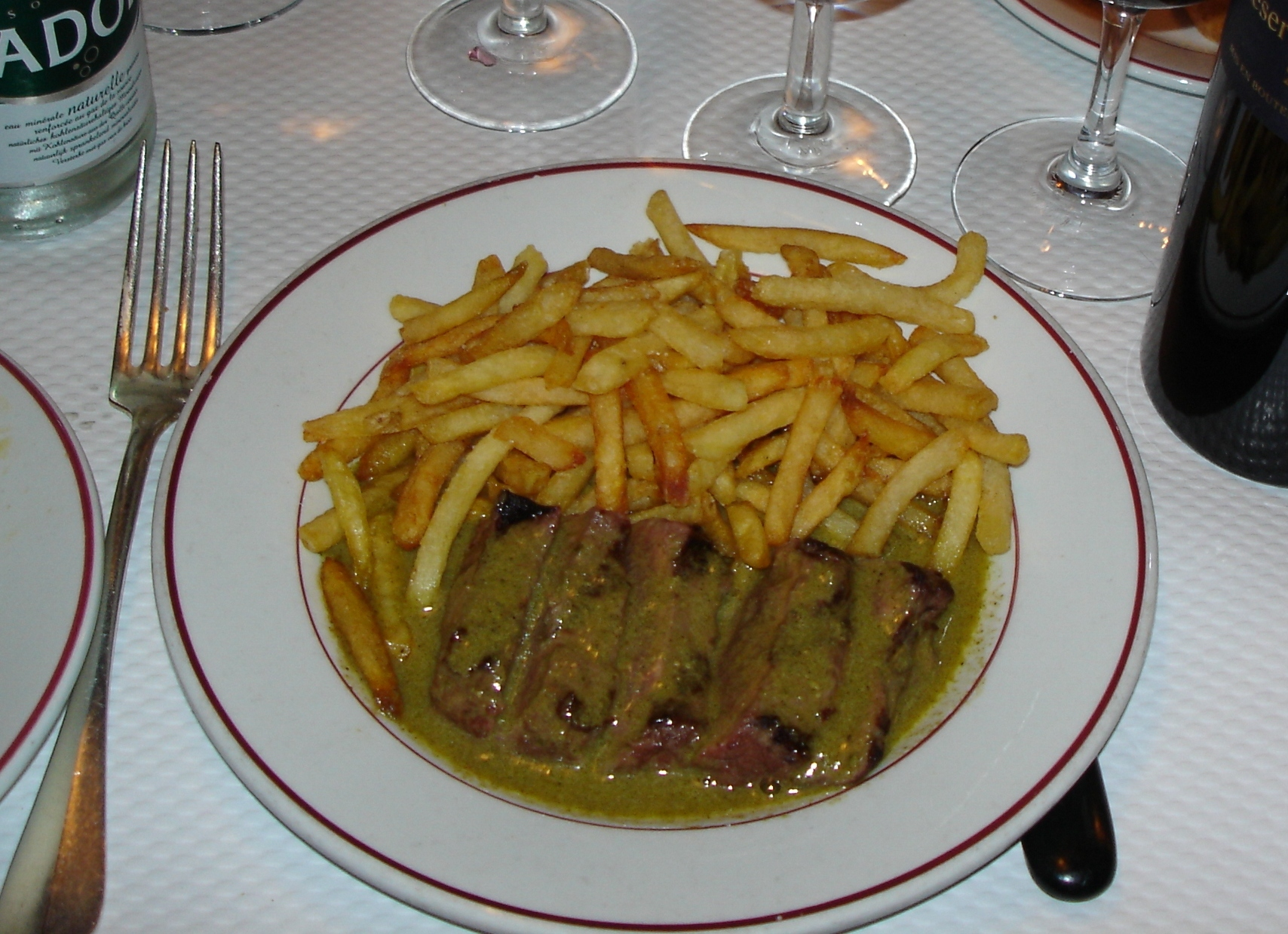
Steak-frites as served by Le Relais de l'Entrecôte in Geneva

Around the world, many restaurants featuring steak dishes use the word entrecôte as their name or part of their name. In particular, the name L'Entrecôte has come to identify three groups of restaurants owned by two sisters and one brother of the Gineste de Saurs family, which specialize in the contre-filet cut of sirloin and serve it in the typical French bistro style of steak-frites, or steak and French fries:

- L'Entrecôte is the popular nickname of the restaurant Le Relais de Venise – L'Entrecôte, founded by Paul Gineste de Saurs in Paris's 17th arrondissement near Porte Maillot. Now run by one of his daughters, the restaurant is widely known as L'Entrecôte Porte-Maillot. It has eight additional locations operating under licence, two in London, one in Bahrain, two in New York, and one in Mexico.
- L'Entrecôte is the legal name of a group of restaurants established by a son of Paul Gineste de Saurs, with locations in Toulouse, Bordeaux, Nantes, Montpellier, Lyon and Barcelona.
- L'Entrecôte is also the popular nickname for the Le Relais de l'Entrecôte restaurants operated by another daughter of Paul Gineste de Saurs, with three locations in Paris and one in Geneva. The oldest of these, in Paris's 6th arrondissement, is widely known as L'Entrecôte Saint-Germain. This group has thirteen additional locations operating under license, four in Kuwait, two in Beirut, and one each in Doha, Dubai, Riyadh, Hong Kong, Shanghai, Istanbul, and Jordan. Two more locations are set to open soon in Cairo.

== History ==
In 1959, Paul Gineste de Saurs purchased an Francia restaurant called Le Relais de Venise (the Venice Inn) in the 17th arrondissement of Paris, near Porte Maillot. A descendant of the Gineste de Saurs family in southern France, he was seeking to establish an assured market for the wines produced by the family's Château de Saurs winery in Lisle-sur-Tarn, 50 kilometres northeast of Toulouse.

In place of the previous Italian menu, he decided the restaurant would offer the traditional French bistro meal of steak-frites as its only main dish, with no other option. Where most restaurants served steak-frites with herbed butter, Le Relais de Venise instead served the dish with a complex butter-based sauce. A simple salad of lettuce topped with walnuts and a mustard vinaigrette was offered as a starter, and not until the end of the meal did the menu offer some choice, from a dessert list of fruit pastries, profiteroles, crème brûlée, and other confections, most of them containing ice cream, chocolate sauce, meringue, and whipped cream.

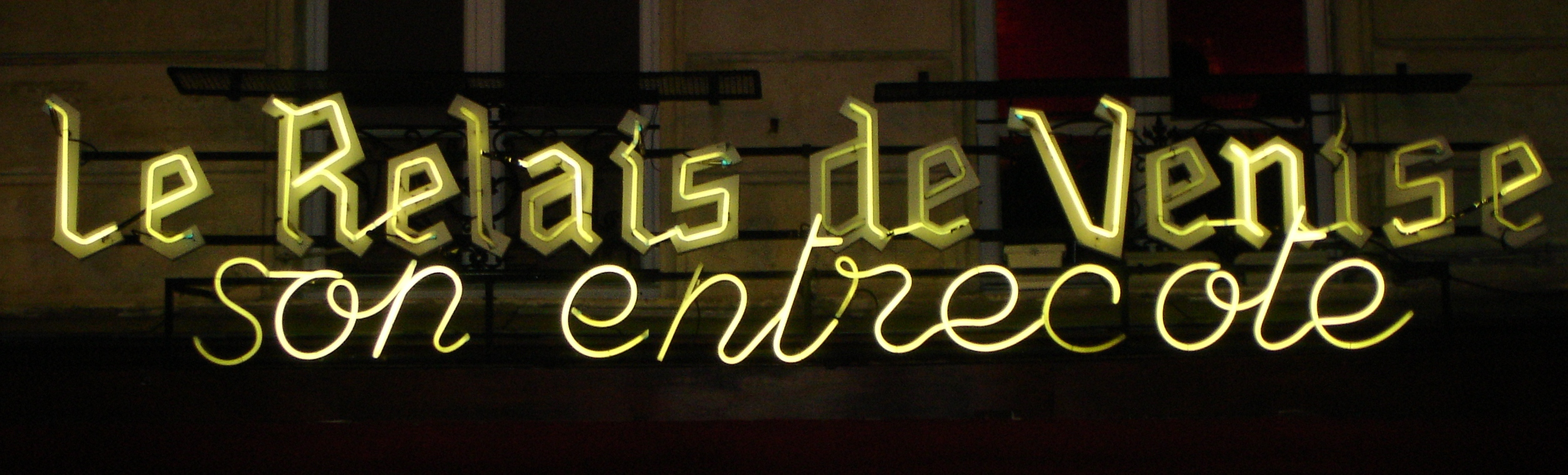
Sign at L'Entrecôte Porte-Maillot in Paris

To highlight the dish the restaurant was now serving, he added the words "Son entrecôte" beneath the name Le Relais de Venise on the neon sign outside. In keeping with the original plan, the restaurant had a very limited wine list and nearly all the wines offered came from the family's Château de Saurs winery.

In serving steak-frites as the sole main dish, he was modelling his restaurant on the Café de Paris in Geneva, which had been serving steak-frites this way since the early 1940s. The butter sauce itself is often referred to as Café de Paris sauce.

Despite serving only one main dish and offering a very limited selection of wines, the restaurant flourished. It became a Paris institution, whose patrons customarily referred to it as "L'Entrecôte", or "L'Entrecôte Porte-Maillot". Eventually, the restaurant's name was formalized as Le Relais de Venise – L'Entrecôte.

== Successors ==
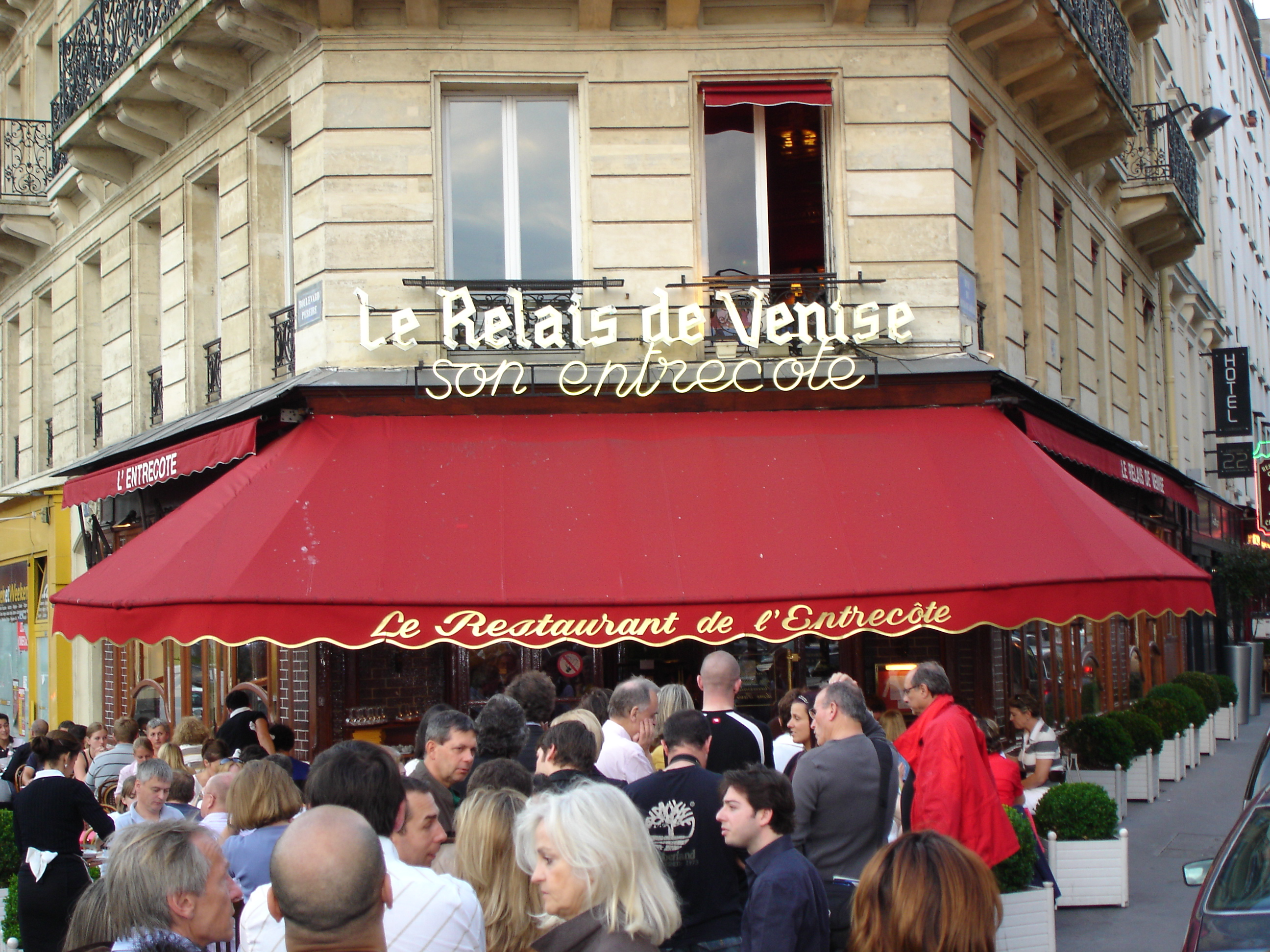
L'Entrecôte Porte-Maillot in Paris's 17th arrondissement

Three separate groups of restaurants, each operated by one of Paul Gineste de Saurs's children, carry on the formula he established.

=== Le Relais de Venise – L'Entrecôte ===
Following the death of Paul Gineste de Saurs in 1966, his daughter Hélène Godillot took control of the original restaurant at Porte Maillot. Her branch of the family has three additional locations operated under licence by Steven and Michael Elghanayan: two in London and one in New York. A second family-owned location in Barcelona opened in 1999 and closed in 2010. A licensed location in Manchester opened in 2012 and closed in 2013.

=== L'Entrecôte ===
In 1962, his son Henri Gineste de Saurs opened a restaurant similar to his father's in Toulouse , 50 kilometres from the family vineyard at Lisle-sur-Tarn. He subsequently opened additional locations in Bordeaux, Nantes, Montpellier, and Lyon.

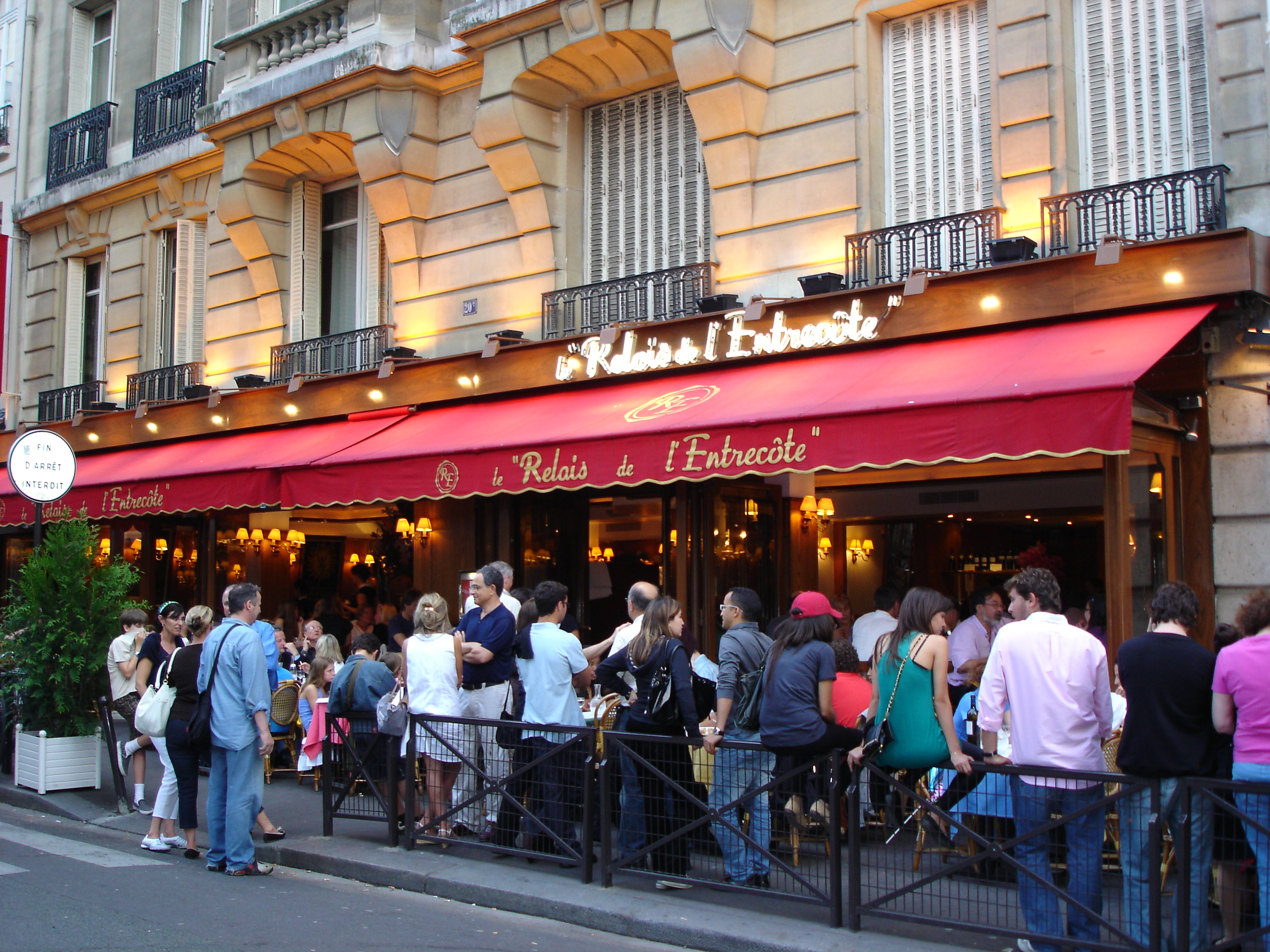
L'Entrecôte Saint-Germain in Paris's 6th arrondissement

=== Le Relais de l'Entrecôte ===
Another daughter, Marie-Paule Burrus, adopted the name Le Relais de l'Entrecôte for her group of restaurants. Her branch of the family has four locations of its own, three in Paris and one in Geneva, as well as seven others operating under licence, two in Beirut run by Boubess Group, and one each in Kuwait City, Doha, Dubai, Riyadh, and Hong Kong. A location operating under licence opened in West Hollywood (Greater Los Angeles) in 2016 and closed in 2017.

Since 1981, Marie-Paule Burrus has also headed the family's Château de Saurs winery with her husband, Yves Burrus, a scion of Switzerland's Burrus family of industrialists.

==== The Relais de l'Entrecôte's Geneva premises ====
From 1979 to 2014, the Geneva restaurant occupied premises that originally housed the Bavaria, a brasserie established in 1912 which became a favourite haunt of international officials during the early years of the League of Nations. In his 1959 novel Goldfinger, Ian Fleming mentions the Bavaria as a place visited by James Bond. The Relais de l'Entrecôte succeeded the Bavaria in 1979, but the rue du Rhône neighbourhood where the restaurant was situated evolved through the years and the street was transformed into a series of luxury boutiques. The restaurant's landlord, the Zurich Insurance Group, started converting its building's ground-floor retail space to such boutiques in 2006 and sought to terminate the restaurant's lease. After eight years of appeals and court decisions, the landlord won out. The restaurant closed on 23 June 2014 and reopened two streets away on 15 July 2014.

Nevertheless, in attempting to thwart the Zurich Insurance Group's determination to terminate the restaurant's lease, Marie-Paule Burrus had in 2011 obtained registered heritage status for the premises encompassing not only the wood panelling and banquettes, ceiling joinery, fittings, and other interior architectural details, but also original furnishings. Consequently, being under the legal obligation to preserve the interior décor intact, including the tables and chairs, the landlord could lease the space out only to another restaurant.

The new occupant of the premises opened for business in the third week of January 2015 under the name Le 49 Rhône, offering a similar menu of steak-frites and desserts.

== The third generation ==
The founder's grandchildren are taking an increasingly active role in the business, in particular Patrick-Alain Godillot in the Relais de Venise – L'Entrecôte group, Valérie Lagarde and Corinne de Roaldès in the L'Entrecôte group, and Paul-Christian Burrus and Géraldine Burrus in the Relais de l'Entrecôte group.

== The formula ==
Although the descendants of Paul Gineste de Saurs operate their groups of restaurants under slightly different names, they all adhere precisely to his formula: the same lettuce-and-walnut salad as a starter; the same steak-frites with the same butter sauce as the main course, presented in two services; the same assortment of desserts; and at the Paris and Geneva locations a wine list featuring wines from the family's own vineyards.

The key to the main dish is the butter sauce. The Paris newspaper Le Monde reports that it is made from chicken livers, fresh thyme and thyme flowers, full cream, white Dijon mustard, butter, and water, plus salt and pepper. According to Le Monde, the chicken livers are blanched in one pan with the thyme until they start to turn colour. In a second pan, the cream is reduced on low heat with the mustard and infused with the flavour of the thyme flowers. The chicken livers are then finely minced and pressed through a strainer into the reduced cream. As the sauce thickens, the butter is incorporated into it with a little water, it is beaten smooth, and fresh-ground salt and pepper are added. The London newspaper The Independent, however, reports that Hélène Godillot has dismissed the Le Monde report as inaccurate.

Le Relais de l'Entrecote restaurant is known for only having two menus—one wine menu and one for dessert. They are also known for their second serving of steak and fries, which is unknown to most first-time restaurantgoers.

The restaurants' atmosphere is a key part of the formula, and is as important to their success as their cuisine. Each group has some decorative touch to distinguish it from its siblings: the Relais de Venise – L'Entrecôte group has mural paintings of Venice and sconces whose lampshades depict Venetian gondoliers; the Relais de l'Entrecôte group features early-twentieth-century posters advertising spirits such as Amer Picon, Wincarnis, and Cherry Chevalier; and the L'Entrecôte group has a colour scheme of yellow-and-black stripes and plaids. In all three groups, though, every restaurant has the typical look of a French brasserie with wood panelling and wall mirrors, closely spaced tables, and bench seating in red upholstery. All the servers are dressed in uniforms with white or yellow aprons. The restaurants do not take advance bookings, which at most of the European locations means that patrons must queue on the pavement outside for half an hour or more before they can be seated.

== See also ==
- List of restaurants in Switzerland
