= TAB-63 =

Romanian prototype armoured personnel carrier

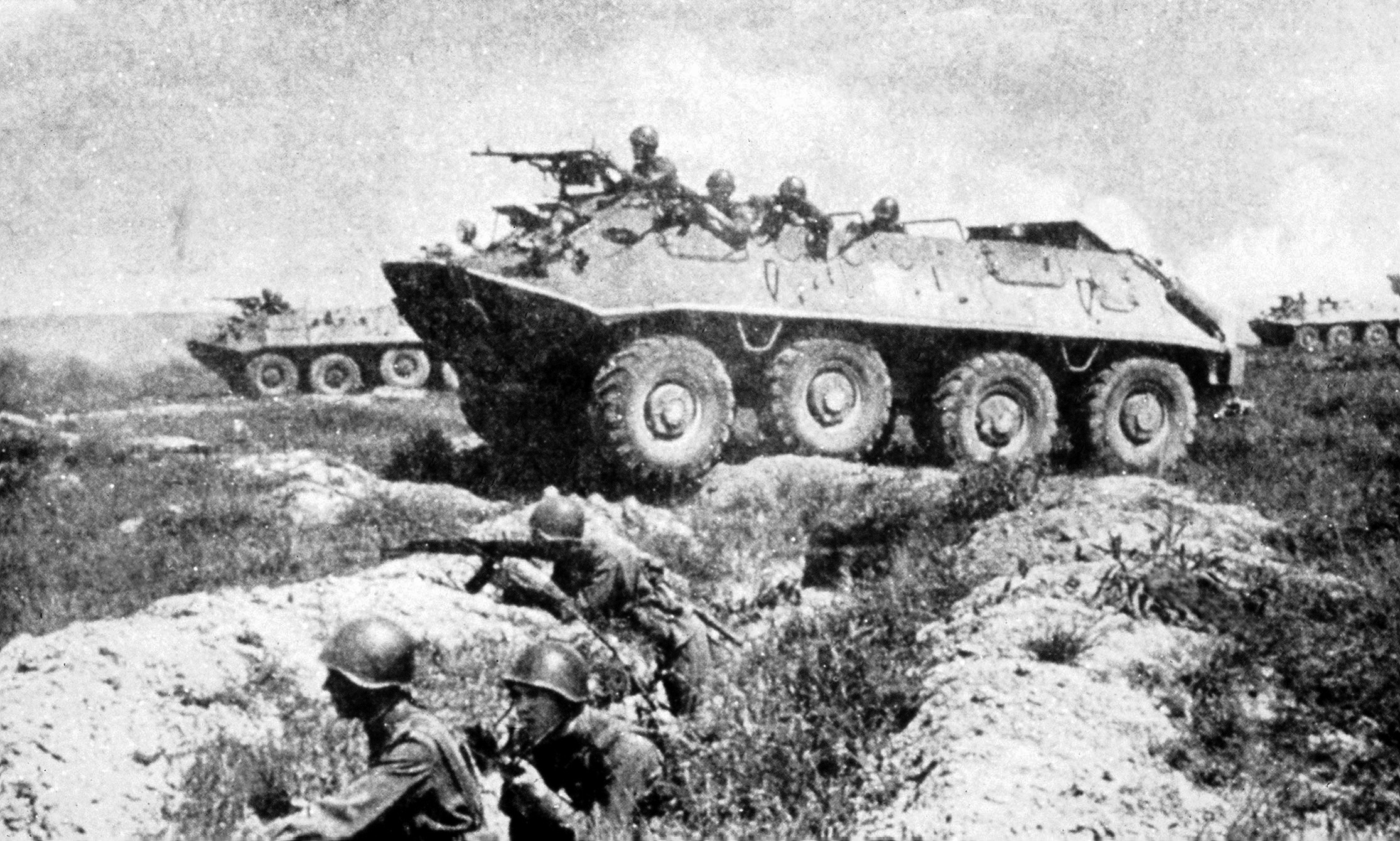
TAB-63 used the armoured hull of the Soviet BTR-60P.

TAB-63 (Romanian: Transportor Amfibiu Blindat model 1963, Amphibious Armoured Personnel Carrier model 1963) was an experimental Romanian prototype of an armoured personnel carrier. Basically, the Romanian engineers used the hull of a Soviet BTR-60P armoured personnel carrier and installed a number of Romanian auto parts in it. Although the design never entered production, the prototype represented the predecessor of the TAB-71 model.

== History ==
In April 1963, the National Defense Council decided to develop a prototype of an armoured personnel carrier equipped with Romanian automotive components. These auto parts were successively installed in the hull of a Soviet BTR-60P (also known as the GAZ-49) at different factories of the local automotive industry. The experimental prototype, designated T.A.B.-63, was equipped with two local-made SR-213 engines, two gearboxes, two transfer cases, two drive shafts, two power take-offs, brakes, hydraulic pumps, parts of the electric system, parts of the centralized tire air pressure control system and a number of support elements of the armoured hull.

The prototype underwent a grueling 15,000-kilometer drive in a military cross country circuit. The amphibious ability was tested for 26 hours. At the end of the tests, the Romanian military engineers stated that if the prototype was equipped with the suitable transmission, it had the same mobility of the BTR-60P model.

Although the TAB-63 never entered production, the experience gained during the development and assembling of this prototype was later used for the production of the TAB-71 armoured personnel carrier.

== See also ==
- TAB
