= Saur 1 =

Romanian wheeled armoured vehicle

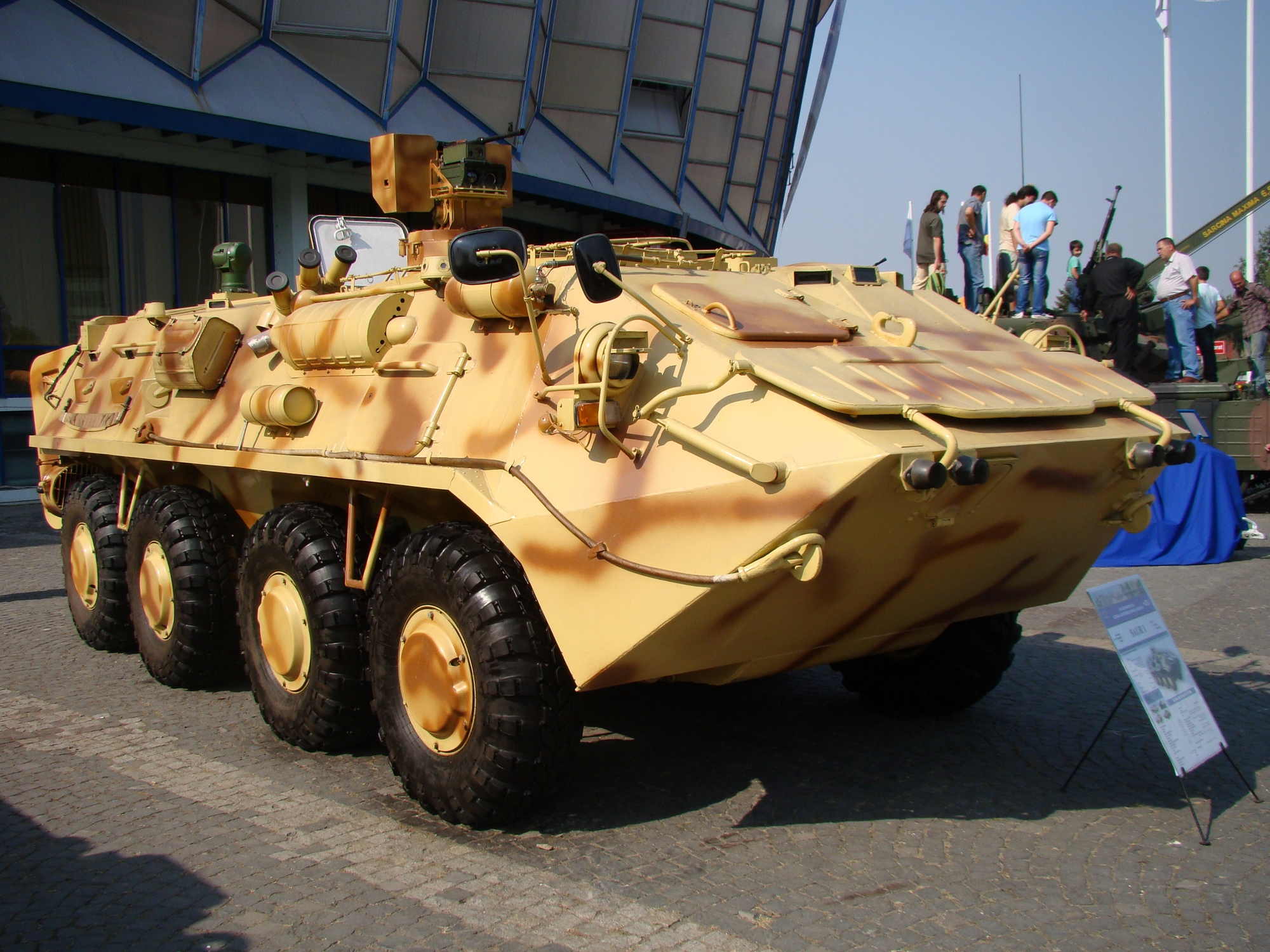
- Saur 1 at Expomil 2011
- Type: Armoured wheeled vehicle
- Place of origin: Romania

Production history
- Designer: ROMARM
- Designed: 2006
- Manufacturer: Uzina Automecanica Moreni SA

Specifications
- Mass: 13,500 kg
- Length: 7.8 m (25 ft 7 in)
- Width: 2.9 m (9 ft 6 in)
- Height: 2.52 m (8 ft 3 in)
- Crew: 3 + 9
- Armor: STANAG Level 4569 1. Can be fitted with an Add-on armour kit, then the protection passes on a level 2.
- Main armament: 7.62 mm belt-fed MG
- Engine: Cummins diesel 275 hp (205 kW)
- Power/weight: 16 kW/t
- Suspension: 8x8
- Operational range: 700 km (430 mi)
- Maximum speed: 100 km/h (62 mph) water: 10 km/h (6.2 mph)

The Saur 1 (formerly Zimbru 2006) is an armoured personnel carrier developed by the Romanian company ROMARM in 2006.

== Development ==
Late in 2006, ROMARM completed the first prototype of a new multi-role amphibious armoured infantry fighting vehicle called Saur. In the past this has been referred to as the Zimbru 2006. The Saur 1 was first unveiled at Expomil 2007. Saur 1 was developed to meet the requirements of the Romanian Army but as of late 2007 no production orders had been placed for the Saur. To meet an Urgent Operational Requirement (UOR), the Romanian Ministry of National Defense has placed a contract with MOWAG of Switzerland for a total of 31 Piranha III (8×8) armoured vehicles with deliveries to run from 2007 through to 2008.

== Description ==
The hull of the Saur 1 is of all-welded steel which provides the occupants with protection from small arms fire and shell splinters with the highest protection being given over the frontal arc. According to ROMARM, the vehicle has Level 1 anti-mine and ballistic protection. The SAUR 1 can be fitted with an add-on armour kit, raising the protection to Level 2.

Layout of the new Saur AIV is in line with more recent 8×8 developments in other countries with the driver's position towards the front on the left and the power pack to the right which makes the chassis easier to adopt for a wide range of battlefield missions. The troop compartment extends to the rear of the hull with the roof hatch arrangement depending on the mission. In a typical AIV role the commander would be seated to the rear of the driver and also be provided with a single-piece hatch cover. Both the driver's and commander's hatch covers open to the rear and to the immediate front are three periscopes for forward observation. The middle one can be replaced by a passive periscope for driving at night. The weapon station would be in the center of the roof with two hatches over the rear troop compartment which open outwards and can be locked in the vertical position. The troops would typically be seated on individual seats down either side facing inwards. The Saur 1 is capable of speeds in excess of 100 km/h.

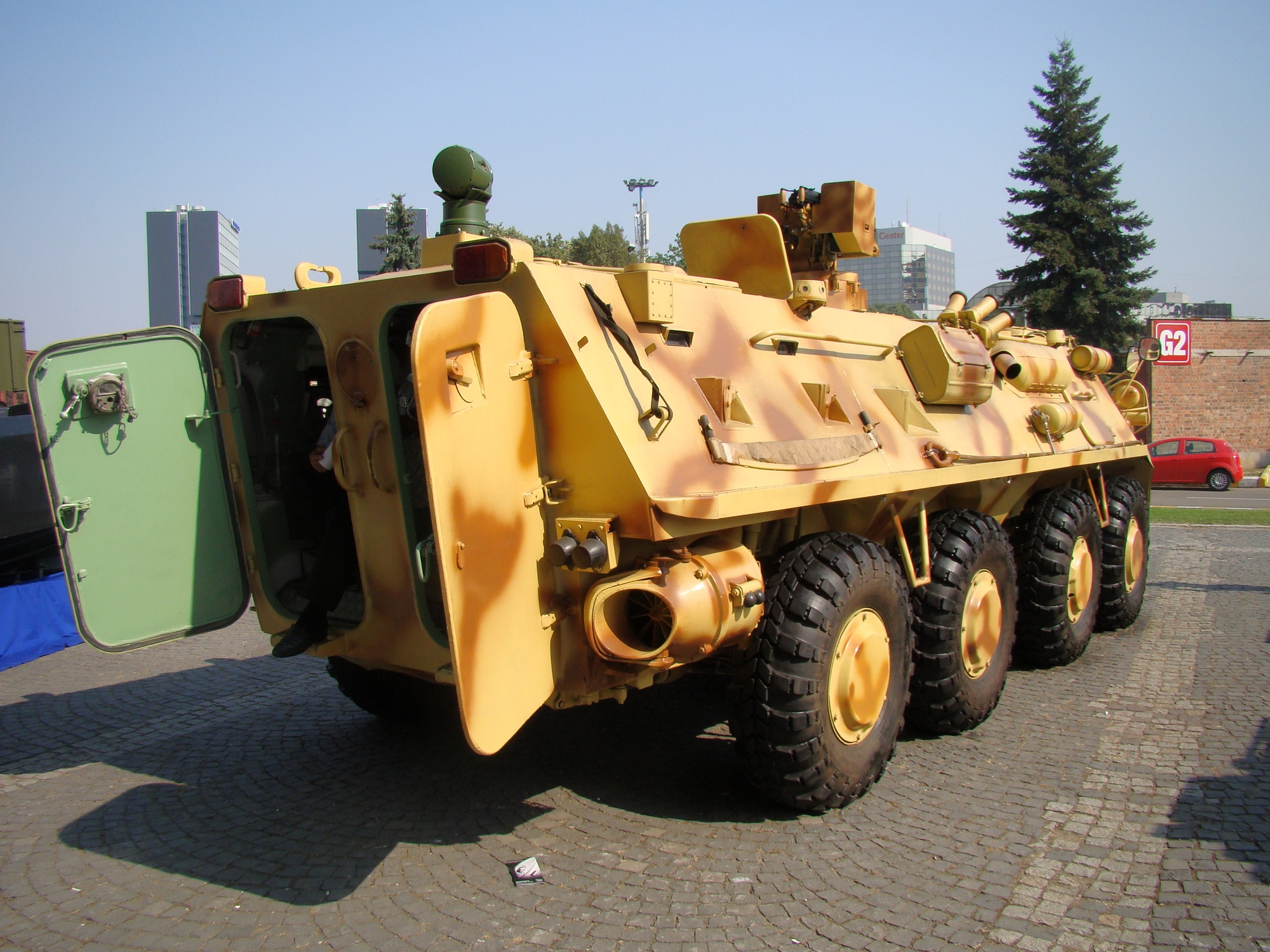
Behind view of SAUR 1 at Expomil 2011

== Variants ==
A new improved version, the Saur 2 was unveiled at the Black Sea Defence & Aerospace (BSDA 2008) exhibition held in Bucharest in 2008. The Saur 2 has a redesigned nose section and is fitted with a new engine and bigger wheels;

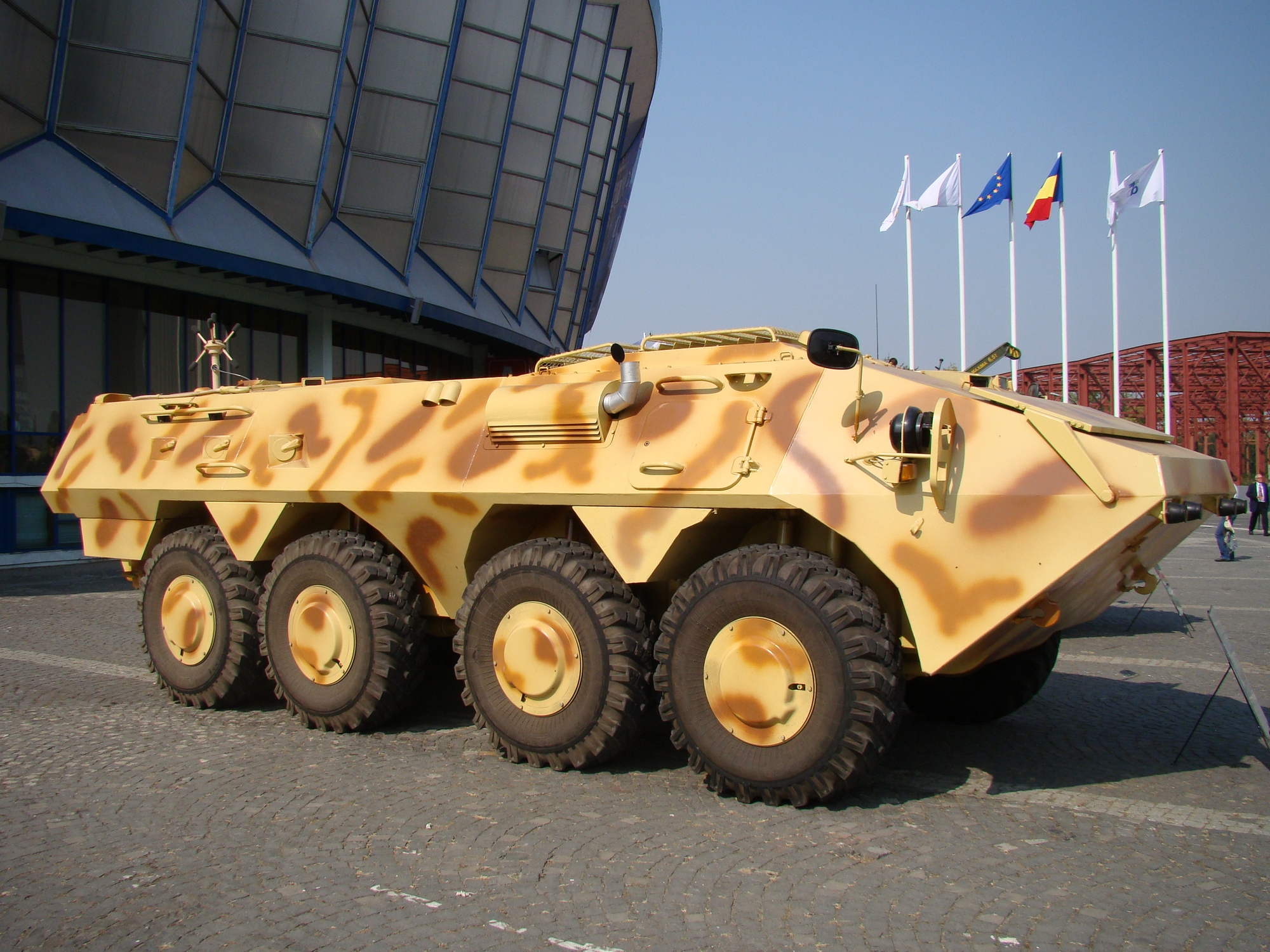
SAUR 2 at Expomil 2011

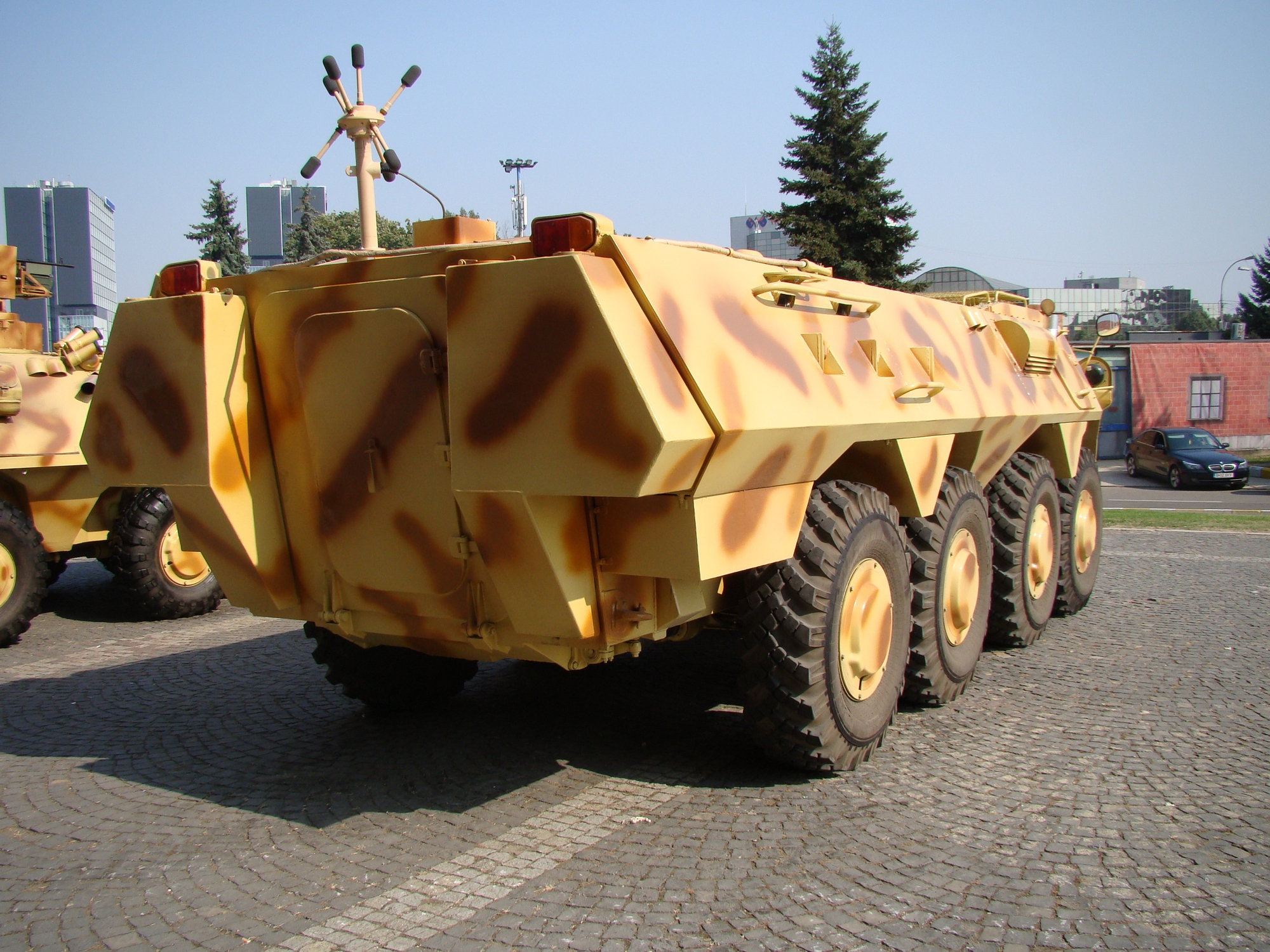
Behind view of SAUR 2 at Expomil 2011

== See also ==
- TAB

=== Comparable vehicles ===
- Stryker – (United States, Canada)
- LAV series
  - LAV III – (Canada)
  - LAV AFV – (Canada)
  - LAV-25 – (Canada)
  - LAV 6 – (Canada)
  - ASLAV – (Australia)
- K808 White Tiger – (South Korea)
- Boxer – (Germany, Netherlands)
- Freccia IFV – (Italy)
- BTR-90 – (Russia)
- CM-32 armoured vehicle – (Taiwan)
- Type 96 armored personnel carrier – (Japan)
  - Type 16 maneuver combat vehicle – (Japan)
- Patria AMV – (Finland)
- BTR-4 – (Ukraine)
- VBCI – (France)
- KTO Rosomak – (Poland)
- FNSS Pars – (Turkey)
- Mowag Piranha/Piranha IV/Piranha V – (Switzerland)
