= Château de Saurs =

Vineyards in Occitania, France

The Château de Saurs vineyards are situated in the heart of the Gaillac wine-growing region of southern France, in Lisle-sur-Tarn, 50 kilometres northeast of Toulouse. Owned by the Gineste de Saurs family, who have lived in the area since the fourteenth century, the estate is centred on the château, or manor-house, which was built between 1848 and 1852 by Eliezer Gineste de Saurs and now serves as the headquarters for the business. Since 1981, its proprietors have been Marie-Paule Burrus, a daughter of Paul Gineste de Saurs, and her husband Yves Burrus, a scion of Switzerland's Burrus family of industrialists.

== Wines ==
Most of the wines produced at the Château de Saurs are reds, from the fer servadou, syrah, merlot, and gamay grape varieties, although some whites and rosés are produced as well. Basic table wines are labelled "Vin de pays des Côtes du Tarn", while vintages carry the designation AOC Gaillac.

The bulk of the winery's production is sold through the family's Le Relais de L'Entrecôte group of restaurants in Paris and Geneva, or in the Le Relais de Venise – L'Entrecôte or L'Entrecôte groups of restaurants owned respectively by Hélène Godillot and Henri Gineste de Saurs, the sister and brother of Marie-Paule Burrus.

== Restaurant connections ==
The connection between the three groups of restaurants and the Château de Saurs winery dates from 1959, when Paul Gineste de Saurs, seeking to create an assured market for his winery's output, purchased a restaurant called Le Relais de Venise in the 17th arrondissement of Paris, near Porte Maillot. He decided that the restaurant would serve the traditional French bistrot meal of steak-frites or steak-and-chips, as its sole main dish, and that it would feature only wines from the family's vineyards. Despite the limited menu, the restaurant thrived, and following his death in 1966 his three children carried on in the business.
