= TAB-71 =

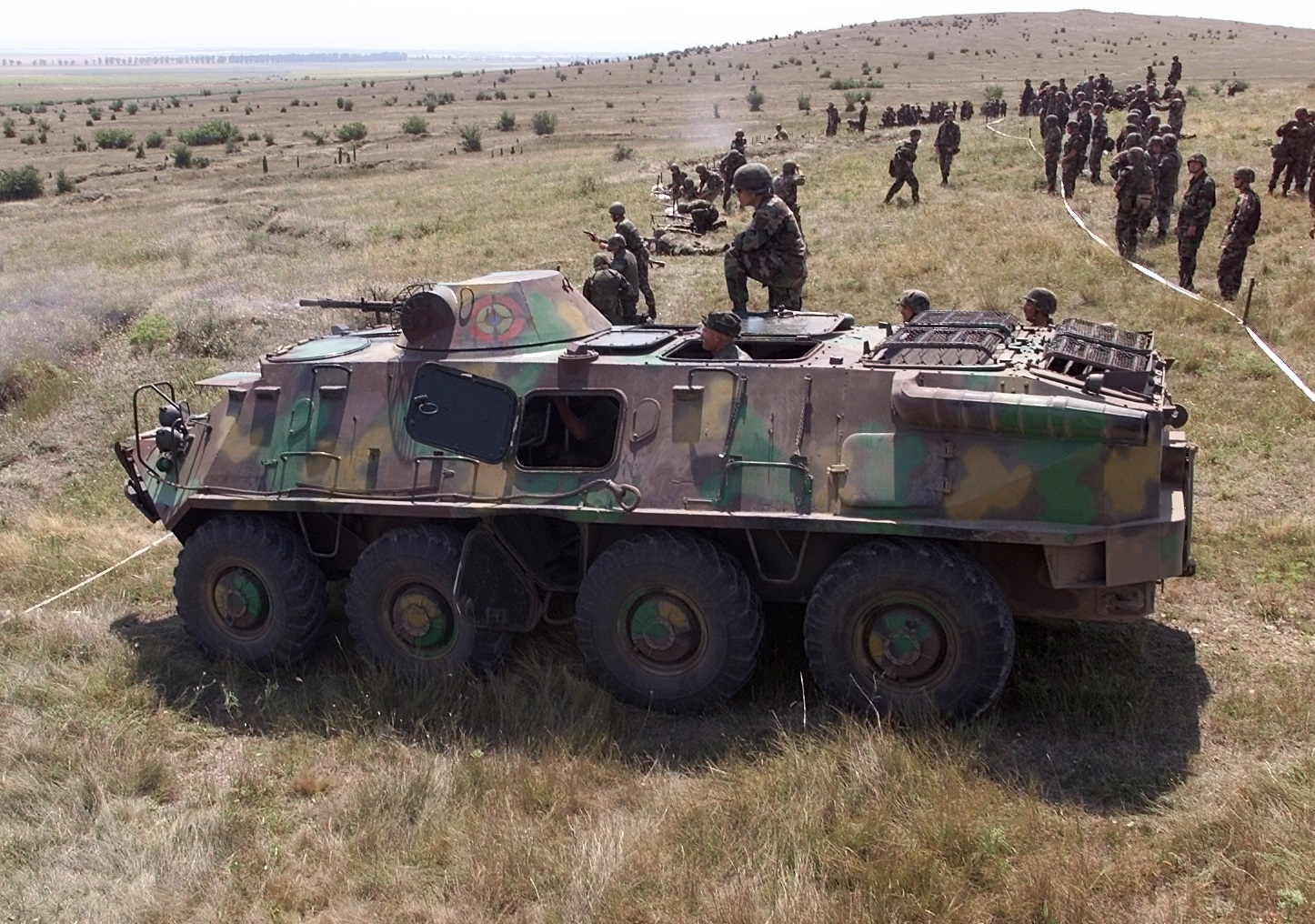
- A TAB-71M at the Babadag range
- Type: Wheeled amphibious armoured personnel carrier
- Place of origin: Romania

Service history
- In service: 1970–present
- Used by: See Operators
- Wars: Romanian Revolution; Croatian War of Independence; Russo-Ukrainian War; Russian invasion of Ukraine

Production history
- Manufacturer: Regia Autonomă Pentru Producția De Tehnică Militară (RATMIL)
- Produced: 1970–1990
- No. built: 1,878
- Variants: See Variants

Specifications (TAB-71)
- Mass: 11 t (24,000 lb)
- Length: 7.22 m (23.7 ft)
- Width: 2.83 m (9.3 ft)
- Height: 2.7 m (8.9 ft)
- Crew: 3 + 8 passengers
- Armor: Steel
- Main armament: 14.5 mm KPVT heavy machine gun (500 rounds)
- Secondary armament: 7.62 mm PKT machine gun (2,000 rounds)
- Engine: 2×SR 255 6-cylinder 140 hp (100 kW)
- Power/weight: 25.4 hp/t (18.9 kW/t)
- Suspension: wheeled 8×8
- Ground clearance: 0.7 m (2.3 ft)
- Fuel capacity: 290 L (77 US gal)
- Operational range: 500 km (310 mi)
- Maximum speed: 95 km/h (59 mph) on road 10 km/h (6.2 mph) in water

The TAB-71 (Transportorul Amfibiu Blindat model 1971) is the Romanian license-built version of the BTR-60PB. It was produced between 1970 and 1990 by RATMIL (now Romarm). It is the only other license manufacture of the BTR-60PB.

== Design and development ==
Romania had the construction and manufacturing documentation for the BTR-60P version since 1962. A year later, the TAB-63 prototype was built however, it did not enter production as the Romanian authorities wished to acquire the license to produce the more modern BTR-60PB.

After the request was granted by the Military Industrial Committee of the Comecon in the late 1960s, production of the TAB-71 began in 1970 by the Romanian Regia Autonomă Pentru Producția De Tehnică Militară factory. The first vehicle was unveiled at a military parade in 1972.

The TAB-71 is similar to the BTR-60PB, the main difference being the more powerful engine, the exhaust pipes were also positioned horizontally. It also had more day-vision periscopes than the BTR-60PB. The TAB also had an improved turret which allowed the guns to fire at a near 90° angle. The new turret also had a land and anti-aircraft (LOTA) sight mounted on the port side.

== Variants ==
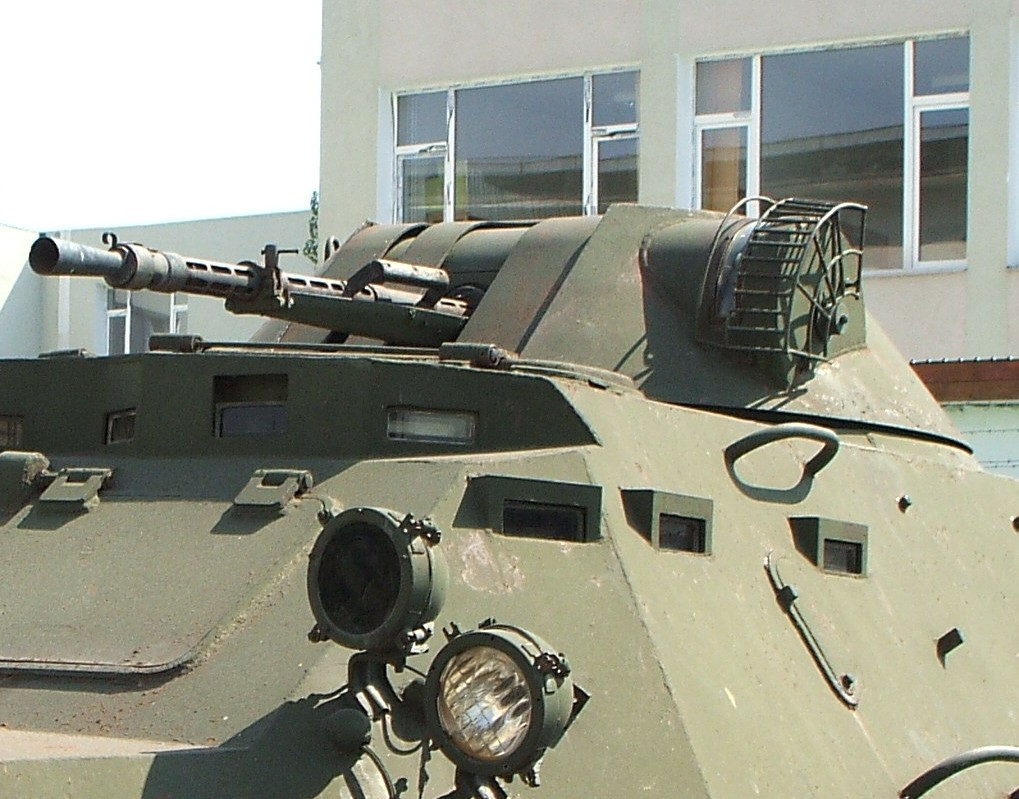
TAB-71M turret

=== TAB-71 ===
The standard model, with two gasoline 140 hp engines .

=== TAB-71M ===
Compared to the previous version, the TAB-71M mounted two diesel 130 hp Saviem 797-05 engines, locally produced by Roman. A small hatch was also added between the second and third axles on either side.

=== TAB-71A R-1450 command vehicle ===
The R-1450 variant has additional communications equipment and features a second antenna on the left side of the hull.

=== TAB-71A R-1451 command vehicle ===
The R-1451 has a different turret. Instead of the regular armament, it has a small crane for the removal of batteries. A box for a generator is mounted on the right side of the roof. There are also four antennae on the right side of the hull roof. The signal equipment used are the R-410M and the R-1451.

=== TAB-71A R1 1452 command vehicle ===
Similar to the R-1451 model. It features additional communications equipment.

=== TAB-71AR ===
Mortar carrier version. Instead of the turret, it is fitted with a 82 mm mortar which fires through the roof of the vehicle. Behind the circular mortar hatches, there are two rectangular roof hatches. A PKMS machine gun is mounted in front of the left side hatch. The vehicle can carry 100 mortar bombs.

=== TERA-71L ===
The TERA-71L is modified for maintenance and recovery role. The enclosed troop compartment is located at the front, and an open compartment in the center, the engine compartment is in the rear.

== Operators ==
=== Current ===
- Romania − In total 1,878 vehicles manufactured. As of 2022, 211 remain in service.
- Moldova − 161 second-hand TAB-71M delivered between 1992 and 1995.
- Ukraine − 20 TAB-71M delivered by Romania in 2022 and 2023.

=== Former ===
- Yugoslavia - A number of 40 vehicles were purchased by Yugoslavia in 1978 and were delivered in 1980 and 1981.
  - Croatia - Several TAB-71Ms were used during the Croatian War of Independence and later scrapped.
