= Gineste de Saurs =

Family of French winemakers

The Gineste de Saurs family of wine producers has lived in southern France since the fourteenth century. The family château, situated in Lisle-sur-Tarn 50 kilometres northeast of Toulouse, was built from 1848 to 1852 by Eliezer Gineste de Saurs and serves as the headquarters for the family's Château de Saurs wine business, headed by Marie-Paule Burrus and her husband Yves Burrus, a scion of Switzerland's Burrus family of industrialists.

== Paul Gineste de Saurs ==
In 1959, Paul Gineste de Saurs established a restaurant in the 17th arrondissement of Paris, near Porte Maillot, offering but one main dish: the traditional French bistro meal of steak-frites, or steak-and-chips. The beefsteak used was the cut of sirloin known in French as contre-filet or entrecôte, and accordingly the restaurant was named Le Relais de Venise – L'Entrecôte. Where most restaurants served steak-frites with herbed butter, Le Relais de Venise instead served the dish with a complex butter-based sauce. A simple salad of lettuce topped with walnuts and a mustard vinaigrette was offered as a starter, and not until the end of the meal did the menu offer some choice, from a dessert list of fruit pastries, profiteroles, and other confections consisting mainly of ice cream, chocolate sauce, meringue, and whipped cream.

== Other activities ==
Following the death of Paul Gineste de Saurs in 1966, three of his children carried on in the business. One daughter – Hélène Godillot – took control of the original restaurant Le Relais de Venise – L'Entrecôte at Porte Maillot, and her branch of the family subsequently opened additional locations under that name in Barcelona (in 2003) and London (in 2005). A second daughter – the same Marie-Paule Burrus who heads the family's Château de Saurs winery – established her group of restaurants under the name Le Relais de l'Entrecôte in the 6th and 8th arrondissements of Paris and in Geneva. And a son – Henri Gineste de Saurs – opened his group of restaurants outside Paris, under the name L'Entrecôte, in Toulouse (in 1962), Bordeaux (in 1966), Nantes (in 1980), Montpellier (in 1990), Lyon (in 1999) and Barcelona (in 2019). The founder's grandchildren are taking an increasingly active role in the business, in particular Patrick-Alain Godillot in the Relais de Venise – L'Entrecôte group, Valérie Lagarde and Corinne de Roaldès in the L'Entrecôte group, and Paul-Christian Burrus in the Relais de l'Entrecôte group.
