= List of infantry equipment of the People's Liberation Army of China =

The following is a list of infantry equipment of the People's Liberation Army of China.

== Pistols ==
Name	Type	Cartridge	Origin	Image	Notes
QSZ-193	Semi-automatic pistol	9×19mm Parabellum; 5.8×21mm DAP92	China		Subcompact/pocket pistol designed for special forces and military officers. 7-round magazine.
QSZ-11	Semi-automatic pistol	5.8×21mm DAP92	China		Compact version of QSZ-92-5.8mm. 8-round magazine. Designed for military officers, pilots and special forces.
QSB-11	Semi-automatic pistol knife combo	5.8×21mm DAP92	China		5.8mm combined pistol knife improved from the QSB-91. Designed for special forces.
QSW-06	Suppressed pistol	5.8×21mm DCV05 or 5.8×21mm DAP92	China		In active service. 20-round magazine. Used by the Special Forces. Replaced the Type 67.
QSZ-92	Semi-automatic pistol	5.8×21mm DAP92 or 9×19mm Parabellum	China		In active service. 15 or 20-round magazines. Improved variants are called QSZ-92A/B.
QSB-91	Semi-automatic pistol knife combo	7.62×17mm	China		7.62 mm combined pistol knife for special forces (phased out)
Type 84	Semi-automatic pistol	7.62×17mm	China		7.62 mm small pistol for security and police forces (phased out)
Type 80	Semi-automatic pistol	7.62×25mm Tokarev	China		7.62 mm machine pistol (phased out)
Type 77	Semi-automatic pistol	7.62×17mm Type 64 or 9×19mm Parabellum	China		7.62 mm pistol (phased out)
Type 67	Semi-automatic pistol	7.62×17mm Type 67 rimless	China		7.62 mm silenced pistol (phased out)
Type 64 silenced	Semi-automatic pistol	7.65×17mm Type 64 rimless	China		7.62 mm silenced pistol (phased out)
Type 64	Semi-automatic pistol	7.62×17mm Type 64	China		7.62 mm semi-automatic pistol, first firearm to be indigenously developed by the People's Republic of China. (phased out)
Type 59	Semi-automatic pistol	9×18mm Makarov	China		7.62 mm semi-automatic pistol, a Chinese copy of the Soviet Makarov pistol (phased out)
Type 54	Semi-automatic pistol	7.62×25mm Tokarev	China		7.62 mm semi-automatic pistol, copy of the Tokarev. Improved version of the Type 51 (phased out).
Type 51	Semi-automatic pistol	7.62×25mm Tokarev	China		7.62 mm semi-automatic pistol, copy of the TT-33. China's first standard pistol after WWII. The Type 51 was virtually identical to the TT-33, except for the Chinese markings on the left rear of the frame or on the top of the slide (phased out).

== Shotguns ==
Name	Type	Cartridge	Origin	Image	Notes
QBA-221	Fully-automatic shotgun	18.4 mm shotshell	China		Fully-automatic shotgun designed for close-quarter raids and anti-drone defense.
QBS-09	Semi-automatic shotgun	18.4 mm shotshell	China		Semi-automatic combat shotgun developed for the PLA Ground Force.
Type 97	Pump-action shotgun	18.4 mm shotshell	China		Pump-action shotgun. PLAGF uses a magazine-fed version.

== Submachine guns ==
Name	Type	Cartridge	Origin	Image	Notes
QCQ-171	Submachine gun	9×19mm Parabellum	China		In service as of 2019.
QCW-05	Bullpup personal defense weapon	5.8×21mm DAP92	China		50-round magazine. Suppressor is detachable.
QCQ-05	Bullpup submachine gun	5.8×21mm DAP92	China		Derived from QCW-05
Type 85	Submachine gun	7.62×25mm Tokarev	China		7.62 mm simplified and suppressed Type 79 submachine gun (phased out)
Type 82	Submachine gun	9×19mm Parabellum	China		9 mm submachine gun, Chinese copy of Polish PM-63 RAK (phased out)
Type 79	Submachine gun	7.62×25mm Tokarev	China		7.62 mm submachine gun (phased out)
Type 64	Submachine gun	7.62×25mm Tokarev	China		7.62 mm suppressed low flash submachine gun (phased out)
Type 54	Submachine gun	7.62×25mm Tokarev	China		7.62 mm submachine gun, a copy of the PPS-43 (phased out)
Type 50	Submachine gun	7.62×25mm Tokarev	China		7.62 mm submachine gun, a copy of the PPSh-41 (phased out)

== Rifles ==
Name	Type	Cartridge	Origin	Image	Notes
QBZ-191	Assault rifle	5.8×42mm	China		5.8 mm assault rifle. Equipped with QMK-152 3x scope, unveiled in 2019. Replacing the QBZ-95 as the standard service rifle.
QTS-11	Assault rifle Airburst grenade launcher	5.8×42mm / 20mm airburst grenade	China		5.8 mm assault rifle with integrated airburst grenade launcher (in limited service). 20-round magazine and single-shot, bolt-action 20mm grenade launcher. An equivalent to the American XM29 OICW. It is a variant of the QBZ-03 assault rifle.
QBZ-95-1	Bullpup assault rifle	5.8×42mm DBP87	China		30-round magazine or 75-round drum magazine. Standard service rifle. Phasing out of service.
QBS-06	Underwater assault rifle	5.8×42mm DBS06	China		24-round magazine.
QBZ-03	Assault rifle	5.8×42mm DBP87	China		30-round magazine. Serving only with the reserve, garrison, and border patrol PLAGF units.
QBZ-95	Bullpup assault rifle	5.8×42mm DBP87	China		30-round magazine or 75-round drum magazine. Standard service rifle. Phasing out of service.
Type 87	Assault rifle	5.8×42mm DBP87	China		5.8 mm assault rifle, experimental rifle for testing the 5.8×42mm ammunition.
Type 81	Assault rifle	7.62×39mm M43	China		7.62 mm assault rifle (phased out). 30-round magazine or 75-round drum magazine. It is now in service only in the Reserve Forces and militia. Based on elements from the Dragunov, SKS, and AK-47/ AKM series rifles.
Type 63	Assault rifle	7.62×39mm M43	China		7.62 mm assault rifle (phased out)
Type 56	Assault rifle	7.62×39mm M43	China		7.62 mm assault rifle, Chinese derivative of the AK-47 (phased out)

== Carbine and short rifles ==
Name	Type	Cartridge	Origin	Image	Notes
QBZ-192	Carbine	5.8×42mm	China		Carbine version of the QBZ-191.
QBZ-95B-1	Carbine	5.8×42mm	China		Carbine version of the QBZ-95-1.
QBZ-95B	Carbine	5.8×42mm	China		Carbine version of the QBZ-95.
Type 56C	Carbine	7.62×39mm M43	China		Ultra-compact, carbine version of the Type 56 assault rifle. 20- or 30-round box magazine. Developed in 1988, known as the last Chinese Kalashnikov.
Type 56 carbine	Semi-automatic carbine	7.62×39mm M43	China		Used in ceremonial role or reserve training. 10-round internal magazine. Deactivated, use as the ceremonial rifle. Based on the SKS.
Type 53 carbine	Bolt-action carbine	7.62×54mmR	China		First standardized rifle built in PRC. Based on the Mosin–Nagant carbine.

== Marksman rifles ==
Name	Type	Cartridge	Origin	Image	Notes
QBU-191	Selective fire designated marksman rifle	5.8×42mm	China		5.8×42mm selective fire designated marksman rifle. 30-round box magazine. Automatic fire mode is retained.
QBU-88	Bullpup designated marksman rifle	5.8×42mm	China		5.8×42mm bullpup designated marksman rifle. 10-round box magazine, effective range, 500 -1000m
Type 85	Semi-automatic rifle	7.62×54mmR	China		7.62×54mmR sniper rifle updated from the Type 79 (phased out)
Type 79	Semi-automatic rifle	7.62×54mmR	China		7.62×54mmR sniper rifle, derivative of Soviet Dragunov (phased out)

== Sniper rifles ==
Name	Type	Cartridge	Origin	Image	Notes
QBU-203 (CS/LR35)	Bolt-action sniper rifle	7.62×51mm	China		7.62×51mm bolt action sniper rifle 5-round box magazine.
QBU-202 (CS/LR35)	Bolt-action sniper rifle	8.6x70mm	China		8.6×70mm bolt action sniper rifle. 5-round box magazine.
QBU-201	Anti-materiel precision rifle	12.7×108mm	China		12.7×108mm bolt-action anti-materiel sniper rifle. 5-round box magazine. In service with PLA.
QBU-141 (CS/LR3)	Bolt-action sniper rifle	5.8×42mm	China		5.8×42mm sniper rifle (in limited service). 5.8mm variant of the CS/LR4 with a 10-round box magazine.
CS/LR4 (NSG-1)	Bolt-action sniper rifle	7.62×51mm CS/DFL3	China		7.62×51mm sniper rifle (in limited service)
QBU-10	Semi-automatic anti-materiel rifle	12.7×108mm	China		12.7×108mm semi-automatic anti-materiel sniper rifle. 5-round box magazine. In service with PLA.
QBU-99	Semi-automatic anti-materiel rifle	12.7×108mm	China		12.7×108mm semi-automatic anti-materiel sniper rifle (phased out). The M99B, a bullpup variant, is also produced.
JS 7.62	Bolt action rifle	7.62×54mmR	China		7.62×54mmR sniper rifle (phased out)
AMR-2	Bolt-action anti-materiel rifle	12.7×108mm	China		12.7×108mm bolt action anti-materiel sniper rifle (phased out)

== Light and medium machine guns ==
Name	Type	Cartridge	Origin	Image	Notes
QJY-201	General-purpose machine gun	7.62×51mm DPM-201	China		7.62 mm general-purpose machine gun, featuring a hybrid recoil system.
QJB-201/QJS-161	Light machine gun	5.8×42mm	China		5.8 mm light machine gun. 100-round and 150-round belt container.
QBB-95	Bullpup light support weapon	5.8×42mm DBP87	China		5.8 mm light machine gun. 30-round magazine or 75-round drum magazine. Light support weapon variant of the QBZ-95.
QJY-88	Light machine gun	5.8×42mm DBP87	China		5.8 mm light machine gun (phased out). 100, 200-round belt. Replaced the Type 67 general-purpose machine gun.
Type 81 machine gun	Light machine gun	7.62×39mm M43	China		7.62 mm light machine gun. 75-round drum magazine. Light machine gun variant of the Type 81 assault rifle (phased out).
Type 80 machine gun	General-purpose machine gun	7.62×54mmR	China		7.62 mm general-purpose machine gun, derivative of the Soviet PKM (phased out). 100, 200, or 250-round magazines.
Type 67 machine gun	General-purpose machine gun	7.62×54mmR	China		7.62 mm general-purpose machine gun, replacing the Type 53 (SG43) and Type 57 (SGM) 7.62 mm general-purpose machine guns (phased out).
Type 58 machine gun	Medium machine gun	7.62×54mmR	China		7.62 mm medium machine gun. Derived from the RP-46
Type 56/56-1 machine gun	Light machine gun	7.62×39mm M43	China		7.62 mm light machine gun based on the RPD machine gun
Type 53 machine gun	Medium machine gun	7.62×54mmR	China		7.62 mm medium machine gun. Derived from the Degtyaryov machine gun (DP)

== Heavy and anti-aircraft machine guns ==
Name	Type	Cartridge	Origin	Image	Notes
QJZ-171	Heavy machine gun	12.7×108mm	China		Ultra-lightweight heavy machine gun for firepower platoon, featuring a hybrid recoil system. Replacing QJZ-89.
QJG-02	Heavy machine gun	14.5×114mm	China		14.5 mm heavy machine gun. Also called the Type 02 anti-aircraft gun. Emplacement.
QJZ-89	Heavy machine gun	12.7×108mm	China		Lightweight heavy machine gun for firepower platoon, featuring a hybrid recoil system.
QJC-88	Heavy machine gun	12.7×108mm	China		12.7 mm vehicle-mounted machine gun
QJG-85	Heavy machine gun	12.7×108mm	China		12.7 mm emplacement machine gun, featuring a hybrid recoil system.
Type 77	Heavy machine gun	12.7×108mm	China		12.7 mm emplacement machine gun, featuring a hybrid recoil system.
Type 75	Heavy machine gun	14.5×114mm	China		14.5 mm emplacement machine gun, vehicle mounted, a towed Type 58, similar to the ZPU
Type 58	Heavy machine gun	14.5×114mm	China		2 x 14.5 mm emplacement machine gun, vehicle mounted, a copy of the KPVT
Type 57	Medium/heavy machine gun	7.62×54mmR	China		7.62×54mmR emplacement machine gun, a copy of the SGM heavy machine-gun
Type 56	Heavy machine gun	14.5×114mm	China		14.5 mm emplacement machine gun, a copy of the KPV
Type 54-1	Heavy machine gun	12.7×108mm	China		12.7 mm emplacement machine gun, a copy of the DShK
Type 54	Heavy machine gun	12.7×108mm	China		12.7 mm emplacement machine gun, a copy of the DShK M1938
Type 53	Medium/heavy machine gun	7.62×54mmR	China		7.62×54mmR emplacement machine gun, a copy of the SG-43 Goryunov

== Infantry operated autocannons ==
Name	Type	Cartridge	Origin	Image	Notes
PG-99 (Type 90)	Towed anti-aircraft gun	35 mm	China		2 x 35 mm towed autocannon based on Type 90 2 X 35 mm, licensed production of Swiss Oerlikon 35 mm twin cannon. Military designation PG-99. Capable of radar-based automatic engagement.
PG-87	Towed anti-aircraft gun	25 mm	China		2 x 25 mm, improved version of the Type 85. Capable of radar-based automatic engagement.
Type 85	Towed anti-aircraft gun	23 mm double barrel air defense cannon	China		2 x 23 mm towed air defense cannon based on the ZU-23-2
PG-74	Towed anti-aircraft gun	37 mm	China		2 x 37 mm towed autocannon; replaced PG-55/PG-65. phased out.
Type 72	Towed anti-aircraft gun	85 mm	China		85 mm towed autocannon, reported to be the Chinese copy of Soviet M1939 (52-K)
Type 71	Towed anti-aircraft gun	20 mm	China		20 mm towed autocannon.
Type 65/74	Towed anti-aircraft gun	37 mm	China		dual 37 mm, twin barrel copy of the Soviet M1939 (61-K).
Type 59 (100mm)	Towed anti-aircraft gun	100 mm	China		100 mm, copy of the Soviet KS-19 gun.
Type 59 (57mm)	Towed anti-aircraft gun	57 mm	China		57 mm, single barrel, copy of the Soviet AZP (S-60).
Type 55	Towed anti-aircraft gun	37 mm	China		37 mm, single barrel copy of the Soviet M1939 (61-K).

== Hand grenades ==
Name	Type	Cartridge	Origin	Image	Notes
Type 18	Frag grenade		China		Fragmentation grenade
DSS-161	Frag grenade		China		Fragmentation grenade
DSY-151	Thermobaric blast grenade		China		Thermobaric grenade
DSB-151	Flashbang		China		Flash and stun grenade
DRH-181/183	Stun grenade		China		Stun grenade
DSR-161	Incendiary grenade		China		Incendiary grenade
DSF-161	Smoke grenade		China		Smoke grenade
FSL-02	Smoke grenade		China		FSL-02 smoke grenade weighs 750 grams, and has a length of 140mm with a diameter of 65mm. Duration is 2 minutes at 2–5 m/s wind speed. The body has a pale green color with a white or black band indicating the color of smoke (white/black). The smoke grenade went into service in 1995, replacing the FSL01 smoke grenade that had been in service since 1963.
Type 86	Frag grenade		China		
Type 82–2	Frag grenade		China		
WY-91	Frag grenade		China		
Type 86	Frag grenade		China		
Type 82	Frag grenade		China		
Type 79	Frag grenade	45mm grenade	China		Rocket-assisted hand grenade
Type 77	Frag grenade		China		
Type 73 mini grenade	Frag grenade		China		
Type 67	Frag grenade		China		
Type 59	Frag grenade		China		Hand grenade. derivative of the Soviet RGD-5

== Grenade launchers ==
Name	Type	Cartridge	Origin	Image	Notes
QLZ-201	Automatic grenade launcher	35x32mm	China		Crew-served AGL. Uses a 50-round ammo box. Successor to QLZ-04.
QLU-11	Semi-automatic direct-fire programmable grenade launcher	35x32mm	China		35x32 mmSR semi-automatic grenade sniper. Uses drum magazines with high-precision airburst ammunition
QLG-10	Under-barrel grenade launcher	35x32mm	China		35 mmCL under-barrel grenade launcher. Designed to be mounted onto QBZ-95, QBZ-95-1, and QBZ-95B-1.
QLB-06	Semi-automatic grenade launcher	35x32mm	China		35x32 mmSR semi-automatic grenade launcher, improved variant of QLZ-87. Semi-automatic variant of the QLZ-87, with a redesigned action.
QLZ-04	Automatic grenade launcher	35x32mm	China		35x32 mmSR automatic grenade launcher. Can be mounted on tripods or vehicles
QLZ-87	Automatic grenade launcher	35x32mm	China		35x32 mmSR automatic grenade launcher, can be handheld, mounted on a tripod, or vehicles.
QLG-91	Under-barrel grenade launcher	35x115mm	China		35x115mm under-barrel grenade launcher. Designed to be mounted onto a Type 56 assault rifle. Later variants can be used with the Type 81, Type 87, and QBZ-95.
QLT-89	grenade discharger	50mm	China		50 mm grenade discharger (in limited service). Handheld grenade discharger / lightweight mortar.
DFR-89	incendiary grenade discharger	35mm	China		Handheld grenade launcher for white phosphorus munitions. Reverse-engineered DM34.

== Rifle grenades ==
Name	Type	Cartridge	Origin	Image	Notes
Type 90	Rifle grenade	40 mm	China		40 mm rifle grenades for the Type 81 assault rifle, Type 87 assault rifle, and QBZ-95. Variants including DQP1 HEAT, DQS1 HE-Frag, DQR1 incendiary, DQF1 smoke, DQJ03 HEDP multipurpose.
Type 67	Rifle grenade	70 mm	China		70 mm rifle grenade produced in 1967 and saw combat in Sino-Soviet border conflict. A scaled-down 60 mm variant was developed in 1970. It saw limited usage on the Type 56 assault rifle.

== Shoulder-launched anti-tank weapons ==
Name	Type	Cartridge	Origin	Image	Notes
PF-11	Disposable Rocket launcher	93mm	China		Developed from PF-97. Warheads include HEAT (DZP151), HE-Frag (DZS151), HEAT-MP Bunker Assault (DZG141), Smoke (DZF151), Thermobaric, incendiary, etc.
DZJ-08	Disposable recoilless launcher	80mm	China		80 mm disposable recoilless gun specialized for confined spaces, multiple munition choices
FHJ-01	Double-barreled incendiary rocket launcher	62mm	China		2 × 62 mm reusable rocket launcher (phased out)
PF-98	Disposable recoilless launcher	120mm	China		120 mm reusable recoilless gun, multiple munition choices
PF-97	Disposable Rocket launcher	93mm	China		93 mm disposable rocket launcher, multiple munition choices. Chinese copy of the RPO-A Shmel.
PF-89	Disposable Rocket launcher	80mm	China		80 mm disposable rocket launcher, multiple munition choices
FHJ-84	Double-barreled incendiary rocket launcher	62 mm	China		2 × 62 mm reusable rocket launcher (phased out)
Type 79	Disposable Rocket launcher	70 mm	China		70 mm mini handheld rocket launcher (phased out)
Type 70	Reusable Rocket launcher	62 mm	China		62 mm reusable rocket launcher (phased out)
Type 69 RPG	Reusable Rocket launcher	40 mm	China		40 mm RPG launcher, derivative of RPG-7 (phased out). Chinese variant of Russian RPG-7

== Recoilless guns ==
Name	Type	Cartridge	Origin	Image	Notes
PF-78	Recoilless gun	82 mm	China		82 mm smoothbore recoilless gun improved from the PF-65, designed to provide a rapid, direct fire support to infantry against hard targets such as light tanks, armoured vehicles, and bunkers. (Phased out) It was replaced by the PF-98 120 mm shoulder-launched anti-tank weapons
PF-75	Recoilless rifle	105 mm	China		105 mm recoilless rifle based on the M40 recoilless rifle. (Phased out)
PF-65	Recoilless gun	82 mm	China		82 mm smoothbore recoilless gun based on the B-10 recoilless rifle. In service by 1965. (Phased out)
PF-56	Recoilless rifle	75 mm	China		75 mm recoilless rifle based on the M20 recoilless rifle. (Phased out)

== Infantry-operated anti-tank missile launchers ==
Name	Type	Cartridge	Origin	Image	Notes
HJ-12	Anti-tank guided missile	135 mm tandem shaped charge HEAT	China		Shoulder-launched anti-tank missile system. Fire and forget, man-portable ATGM similar to FGM-148 Javelin.
HJ-8	Anti-tank guided missile	120 mm tandem shaped charge HEAT	China		Tripod- and vehicle-mounted infantry anti-tank missile system. Wire-guided SACLOS missile.
HJ-73	Anti-tank guided missile	125 mm tandem shaped charge HEAT	China		Infantry portable or vehicle-mounted anti-tank missile. Wire-guided MCLOS and later SACLOS missile.

== Man-portable air-defense systems ==
Name	Type	Cartridge	Origin	Image	Notes
QN-202	Man-portable air-defense system	40 mm	China		40 mm Micro missile designed to engage drones, helicopters, light vehicles, and fortifications.
HN-6B	Man-portable air-defense system	72 mm	China		72 mm Man-portable air-defense system (MANPADS) with imaging infrared homing.
QW-3	Man-portable air-defense system	72 mm	China		72 mm Man-portable air-defense system (MANPADS) with semi-active laser homing.
HN-6	Man-portable air-defense system	72 mm	China		72 mm Man-portable air-defense system (MANPADS) with dual-band infrared homing.
QW-2	Man-portable air-defense system	71 mm/72 mm	China		72 mm Man-portable air-defense system (MANPADS) with dual-band infrared homing.
QW-1	Man-portable air-defense system	71 mm/72 mm	China		72 mm Man-portable air-defense system (MANPADS). Retired.
HN-5/A	Man-portable air-defense system	72 mm	China		72 mm Man-portable air-defense system (MANPADS). Retired.

== Mortars ==
Name	Type	Cartridge	Origin	Image	Notes
PBP-201 (Type 201)	Mortar	60 mm	China		In service. 60 mm lightweight mortar deployed by PLAGF infantry company's firepower platoons. It features an improved trigger, a laser rangefinder, an integrated fire control unit, and a reflex sight.
PBP-172 (Type 172)	Mortar	120 mm	China		In service. 120 mm mortar deployed by light infantry battalion firepower companies.
PP-93 (Type 93)	Mortar	60 mm	China		Lightweight 60 mm mortar for the PLAGF mountain and air assault infantry units. PP-89 with an extended barrel for a longer range. Replaced Cold War-era Type 63. Phasing out and being replaced by the PBP-201.
PP-89 (Type 89)	Mortar	60 mm	China		Lightweight 60 mm mortar for the PLAGF regular infantry units. Replaced Cold War-era Type 63. Phasing out and being replaced by the PBP-201.
PP-89-100 mortar (Type 89–100)	Mortar	100 mm	China		In service. 100 mm mortar deployed by the PLAGF regiment-level firepower companies. Replaced Cold War-era Type 71.
PP-87 (Type 87)	Mortar	82 mm	China		In service. 82 mm mortar deployed by the PLAGF battalion-level firepower companies. Replaced Cold War-era Type 67.
W86 (Type 86)	Mortar	120 mm	China		Improved from the Type 64. Due to weight issues, it was only produced in limited quantities for the PLA, and many units chose the lighter Type 87 82 mm and Type 89 100 mm mortars instead. Phasing out in 2010 and being replaced by the PBP-172 (Retired).
W84 (Type 84)	Mortar	82 mm	China		Improved from the Type 67. Battalion-level mortar. Limited testing (Retired).
Type 71 mortar	Mortar	100 mm	China		Regiment-level mortar (Retired). Replaced by the PP-89-100.
Type 67 mortar	Mortar	82 mm	China		Battalion-level mortar (Retired). A copy of the 82-PM-41. Replaced by the PP-87.
Type 64 mortar	Mortar	120 mm	China		Regiment-level mortar (Retired). Improved design and an upgrade to the Type 55. Replaced by 100 mm mortars in the 1980s due to weight issues.
Type 63 mortar	Mortar	60 mm	China		Company-level mortar (Retired). Replaced by the PP-89 and PP-93.
Type 56 mortar	Mortar	160 mm	China		Copy of the M-160 mortar (Retired).
Type 55 mortar	Mortar	120 mm	China		A more robust but heavier version of the Type 53 developed by Norinco (Retired).
Type 53 (120mm) mortar	Mortar	120 mm	China		A copy of the 120-PM-43 mortar (Retired).
Type 53 (82mm) mortar	Mortar	82 mm	China		A copy of the 82-BM-37 mortar (Retired).

== Flamethrowers ==
Name	Type	Cartridge	Origin	Image	Notes
Type 74 (FPH-02)	Flamethrower	3× 3.5 L fuel tanks	China		Thickened gasoline flamethrower, developed from the Type 58 flamethrower. Improved variants included FPH-02A and FPH-02B. Phased out.
Type 58 flamethrower (FPH-01)	Flamethrower	3× 3.5 L fuel tanks	China		Thickened gasoline flamethrower, a copy of the Soviet LPO-50. Used for anti-trench and close-range anti-personnel warfare (Retired).

== Mines ==
Name	Type	Cartridge	Origin	Image	Notes
GLD-260 anti-tank mine	Anti-tank mine	Tripwire, Pressure	China		Third-generation Chinese anti-tank mine. Manually laid. Vibration or pressure triggered.
GLD-230 anti-tank mine	Anti-tank mine	Tripwire	China		Third-generation Chinese anti-tank mine. Manually laid. Off-route mine with infrared, sound, and vibration sensors.
GLD-224 anti-tank mine	Anti-tank mine	Pressure	China		Third-generation Chinese anti-tank mine. Rocket or air-dispersed scatterable. Magnetic and pressure sensor.
GLD-151 anti-personnel mine	Anti-personnel mine	Tripwire, Command	China		Third-generation Chinese anti-personnel mine. Manually laid. Directional.
GLD-150 anti-personnel mine	Anti-personnel mine	Tripwire, Command	China		Third-generation Chinese anti-personnel mine. Manually laid. Directional.
GLD-132 anti-personnel mine	Anti-personnel mine	Tripwire, Command, Pressure	China		Third-generation Chinese anti-personnel mine. Manually laid. Jumping mine.
GLD-125 anti-personnel mine	Anti-personnel mine	Pressure	China		Third-generation Chinese anti-personnel mine. Rocket or air-dispersed scatterable.
GLD-121 anti-personnel mine	Anti-personnel mine	Tripwire, Pressure	China		Third-generation Chinese anti-personnel mine. Manually laid. Electronic anti-handling device.
GLD-115 anti-personnel mine	Anti-personnel mine	Pressure	China		Third-generation Chinese anti-personnel mine. Rocket or air-dispersed scatterable.
GLD-112 anti-personnel mine	Anti-personnel mine	Tripwire, Pressure	China		Third-generation Chinese anti-personnel mine. Manually laid.
Type 85 mine	Anti-tank mine	Pressure	China		Chinese plastic-cased circular anti-tank blast mine, improved from the Type 72 anti-tank mine. (Phased out)
Type 84 mine	Anti-tank mine	Pressure	China		Chinese rocket or air-dispersed scatterable anti-tank mine; magnetic proximity fuze. (Phased out)
Type 81 mine	Anti-tank mine	Pressure	China		Chinese rocket or air-dispersed scatterable anti-tank mine; anti-mine clearing design (Phased out)
Type 81 signal mine	Signal mine	Tripwire, Pressure	China		Chinese non-lethal sound and light signal mines, which launch two signals after tripping (Phased out)
Type 72 plastic mine	Anti-tank mine	Pressure	China		Chinese plastic-cased circular anti-tank blast mine, it is similar to the Russian TM-46 mine. Improved from the Type 69 anti-tank mine. (Phased out)
Type 72 metallic mine	Anti-tank mine	Pressure	China		Chinese metal-cased circular anti-tank blast mine, it is similar to the Russian TM-46 mine. The mine has a central plastic-cased, blast-resistant fuze. Improved from the Type 69 anti-tank mine. (Phased out)
Type 72 anti-personnel jumping mine	Anti-personnel mine	Tripwire, Command, Pressure	China		Second-generation Chinese jumping mine, improved from the Type 69 anti-personnel mine, used in the Sino-Vietnamese War. (Phased out)
Type 72 anti-personnel mine	Anti-personnel mine	Tripwire, Pressure	China		Second-generation Chinese anti-personnel mine, circular plastic mine used by both sides during the Sino-Vietnamese War. (Phased out)
Type 69 anti-tank mine	Anti-tank mine	Pressure	China		Chinese metal-cased circular anti-tank blast mine, improved from the Type 59 anti-tank mine. (Phased out).
Type 69 anti-personnel mine	Anti-personnel mine	Tripwire, Command, Pressure	China		First-generation Chinese anti-personnel mine, anti-personnel bounding mine modeled after the M2 mine and S-mine. (Phased out)
Type 66 mine	Anti-personnel mine	Tripwire, Command	China		First-generation Chinese anti-personnel mine, directional anti-personnel mine, a copy of the Claymore mine. (Phased out)
Type 59 anti-tank mine	Anti-tank mine	Pressure	China		Chinese metal-cased circular anti-tank blast mine, it is similar to the Russian TM-46 mine. (Phased out)
Type 59 anti-personnel mine	Anti-personnel mine	Tripwire, Command, Pressure	China		First-generation Chinese anti-personnel stake mine, a copy of the POMZ-2M. (Phased out)
Type 58 anti-personnel mine	Anti-personnel mine	Tripwire, Command, Pressure	China		First-generation Chinese anti-personnel stake mine, a copy of the POMZ-2. (Phased out)
Type 58 anti-personnel mine	Anti-personnel mine	Pressure	China		First-generation Chinese anti-personnel mine, a copy of the PMN mine. (Phased out)

== See also ==
- People's Liberation Army
- People's Liberation Army Ground Force
- List of equipment of the People's Liberation Army Ground Force − a list including vehicles and other equipment
