= QBU =

QBU or QBUS may refer to:

- QBU-191, a Chinese designated marksman rifle
- QBU-10, a Chinese anti-materiel sniper rifle
- QBU-88, a Chinese designated marksman rifle
- QBU, a nickname for the University of Miami Hurricanes football program
- Q-Bus, a technology used with PDP and MicroVAX computer systems
- QBUS Cambuslans, a BT site engineering code
- Qualified business unit, an accounting concept
