= QMK152 =

- Type: Optical sight
- Place of origin: China

Service history
- In service: 2019–present
- Used by: People's Liberation Army, (All branches)

Production history
- Designed: 2015–2019
- Manufacturer: Norinco (China North Industries Corporation)
- Variants: QMK171

Specifications

QMK152 is a 3× magnification optical sight developed for the People's Liberation Army (PLA) of China. It is designed as the standard aiming optic for the QBZ-191 assault rifle family.

== Design and features ==
The QMK152 features a fixed 3× magnification prism sight with dual illumination system that combines natural light collection via fiber optic and tritium-powered illumination for low-light conditions, eliminating the need for batteries. The sight was first publicly revealed during the 2019 National Day military parade alongside the new QBZ-191 rifle family.

According to reports from Hong Kong's Ta Kung Pao, the QMK152 utilizes fiber optic technology to absorb ambient light during daytime operations, while incorporating radioactive tritium gas for nighttime illumination. The sight features an automatic brightness adjustment system based on environmental lighting conditions.

The QMK152 is reported to incorporate Bindon Aiming Concept (BAC) automatic magnification functionality, though this has not been officially confirmed by Chinese authorities. This feature would allow the sight to function at 1× magnification during rapid movement for wider field of view, automatically returning to 3× magnification when stationary or moving slowly.

== Development and production ==
The QMK152 was developed by the 208th Research Institute of China North Industries Group, a subsidiary of Norinco. Development began in the mid-2010s as part of the next-generation individual weapon system program that produced the QBZ-191 rifle family.

China Armament Equipment Group, another Norinco subsidiary, has stated that the new rifle system achieved major breakthroughs in key technologies, with significantly improved accuracy and reliability. The QMK152 was designed to complement these improvements by providing superior optical performance compared to previous Chinese military sights.

== Variants ==
=== QMK171 ===
A variant designated QMK171 was developed specifically for compatibility with older Chinese rifle models, including the Type 95 and Type 03 assault rifles, which utilize a dovetail mounting rail instead of the Picatinny rail system on the QBZ-191. The QMK171 maintains the same optical characteristics as the QMK152 but incorporates a dovetail mounting adapter.

This variant has been observed in use by PLA units in high-altitude regions, including the Tibet Military District. Both the QMK152 and QMK171 feature similar external profiles, with the primary difference being the mounting system.

== Operational deployment ==
The QMK152 entered service with the PLA and People's Armed Police (PAP) in 2019, coinciding with the introduction of the QBZ-191 rifle family. Initial deployment focused on special operations forces and reconnaissance units before wider distribution to regular infantry units.

The sight has been particularly noted for its performance in high-altitude environments. The Tibet Military District's reconnaissance units have reported significant improvements in shooting accuracy after adopting rifles equipped with the QMK152 sight. During training exercises, soldiers using the new sight have demonstrated the ability to consistently hit specific target areas, such as the left or right eye on human-shaped targets at standard combat ranges.

The QMK152 has also been observed in use by the PLA Navy's Jiaolong Commandos, an elite special operations unit. This unit has integrated the sight into their advanced individual combat system, combining it with laser aiming devices and other tactical accessories.

== Technical specifications ==
Based on available information, the QMK152 specifications include:

- Magnification: 3× fixed
- Illumination: Dual system (fiber optic + tritium)
- Power source: None required (passive illumination)
- Mounting system: Picatinny rail (QMK152 standard), Dovetail rail (QMK171 variant)
- Compatibility: QBZ-191, QBZ-192, QBU-191, Type 95 (with QMK171), Type 03 (with QMK171)

The sight is designed to withstand harsh environmental conditions and maintain zero during extended combat operations.

== Comparison with previous equipment ==
The QMK152 represents a significant improvement over previous Chinese military optics. Earlier sights used on Type 95 rifles were often criticized for high mounting positions and limited optical performance. The QMK152's lower profile mounting and advanced illumination system provide better target acquisition capabilities.

Compared to foreign equivalents like the ACOG (Advanced Combat Optical Gunsight) used by the U.S. Marine Corps, the QMK152 offers similar functionality with its fixed magnification and illuminated reticle, though specific performance metrics have not been publicly disclosed.

== Future prospects ==
As the QBZ-191 rifle family continues to replace older Type 95 rifles across the PLA, the QMK152 is expected to become the standard optical sight for most Chinese infantry units. The sight's modular design and proven performance in diverse operational environments position it as a key component of China's next-generation individual soldier system.

Continued improvements in Chinese optical manufacturing technology suggest that future variants may incorporate additional features such as integrated rangefinding or ballistic compensation capabilities.

== See also ==
- QBZ-191
- QBZ-192
- QBU-191
- Norinco
- People's Liberation Army Ground Force
