= Type 58 =

Type 58 may refer to:

- Type 58 assault rifle, a North Korean copy of the Soviet AK-47 assault rifle
- Type 58 machine gun, a Chinese copy of the Soviet RP-46 medium machine gun
- Type 58 heavy machine gun, a Chinese copy of the Soviet KPVT heavy machine gun
- Type 58 flamethrower (FPH-01), a Chinese copy of the Soviet LPO-50 flamethrower
- Type 58 stake mine, a Chinese copy of the Soviet POMZ-2 stake mine
- Type 58 anti-personnel mine, a Chinese copy of the Soviet PMN mine
