= Type 87 assault rifle =

Chinese-designed selective-fire, gas-operated assault rifle

The Type 87 (Chinese: 87式自动步枪) is a Chinese-designed selective-fire, gas-operated assault rifle.

== History ==
The Chinese People's Liberation Army attempted to replace the Type 56 assault rifle and the Type 56 carbine, which led to a failed adoption of the Type 63.

Consecutively, the 1979 Sino-Vietnamese War acclerated the PLA's need for a modernised service rifle, which led to the birth of the Type 81.

Thus, the Type 81 was redesigned into the Type 87, as a development platform for the next generation of PLA small arms which was finalized in 1987.

== Design ==
The Type 87 is similar to the Type 81 except that it has a plastic furniture and an L-shaped folding stock.

The Type 87 served as a test-bed for the then new 5.8×42mm DBP87 ammunition, which was later used by QBZ-95, QBZ-03 and QBZ-191 as the standard issue rifle ammunition.

The Type 87 could be equipped with DQJ03、DQP-1 and DQD-1 rifle grenades, while being issued with the Type 87 bayonet, the first knife bayonet in PLA service.

== Variants ==
=== Type 87A ===
Prototype assault rifle designed from late 1987 to 1989 as a facelift for the Type 87 in anticipation of the 1989 National Day parade, known as the "Project 8910".

The rifle features a two-piece polymer handguard with improved ventilation, polymer magazines, and polymer pistol grip.

Limited production began in spring of 1989. It never went into full-scale production but has been in service with PLA special forces.

=== Type 87 LMG ===
Prototype light machine gun based on the Type 87 design, also known as the QJB87.

=== QBZ-03 ===
Redesigned and modernised Type 87 rifle.

== Adoption ==
While the Type 87 never went into full-scale production and was soon replaced, it remains in PLA service in limited numbers.

== Users ==
- China
