= QBU-88 =

Type 88 (88式狙击步枪)
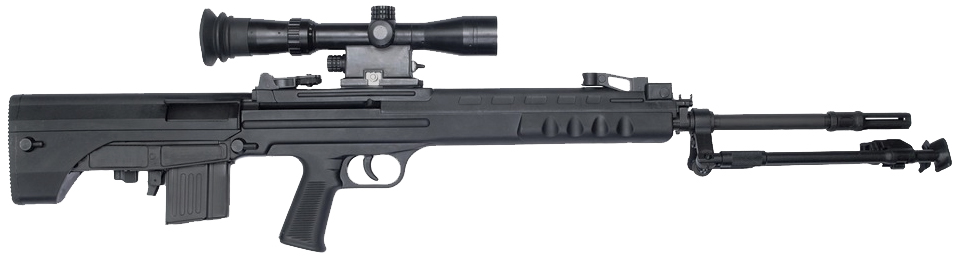
- The QBU-88
- Type: Designated marksman rifle
- Place of origin: People's Republic of China

Service history
- In service: 1997–present
- Used by: See #Users

Production history
- Designed: 1990s
- Manufacturer: Norinco
- Variants: QBU-97A

Specifications
- Mass: 4.1 kg (9.0 lb)
- Length: 920 mm (36.2 in)
- Barrel length: 640 mm (25.2 in)
- Cartridge: 5.8×42mm DBP87 (with non-standard loading); 5.56×45mm NATO (QBU-97A export variant)
- Action: Gas-operated, rotating bolt
- Effective firing range: 500–1,000 m (1,600–3,300 ft)
- Feed system: 10-round detachable box magazine
- Sights: 3-9×40, 6-24×44 telescopic sights

The QBU-88 (Chinese: 88式狙击步枪; pinyin: 88 Shì jūjī bùqiāng; translated; "88 Sniper Rifle") is a Chinese bullpup designated marksman rifle, chambered in 5.8×42mm distributed by Norinco.

== History ==
The QBU-88 rifle (Mandarin: Qīngwuqi Bùqiāng Jūjī; "Light Weapon, Rifle, Sniper") (also sometimes referred to as Type 88 rifle) was the first weapon of the newest generation of Chinese small arms, chambered for proprietary 5.8×42mm DBP87 ammunition.

Adopted in 1997, the QBU-88 is, by the modern sense, not a true sniper rifle – it is more a designated marksman rifle, intended for aimed semi-automatic fire at ranges beyond the capabilities of standard infantry assault rifles.

The rifle is intended for rough military use, so it is fitted with adjustable iron sights by default, and is generally equipped with telescopic sights or with night sights.

The QBU-88 rifle is optimized for a special heavy loading of 5.8×42mm cartridge with a longer streamlined bullet with steel core. It can also fire standard ammunition intended for the QBZ-95 assault rifles.

The QBU-88 is being phased out and being replaced by the QBU-191 and the CS/LR4.

== Design details ==
The QBU-88 rifle is a gas-operated semi-automatic rifle. It utilizes a short-stroke gas piston, located above the barrel, and three-lug rotating bolt. The action is mounted in the compact steel receiver, and enclosed into a polymer bullpup-type housing.

To increase accuracy, the action is mated to a 640 mm (25.1 in) long, hammer-forged match-grade barrel. The safety switch is located at the bottom of the receiver, just behind the magazine opening.

The QBU-88 rifle is equipped with open, diopter-type adjustable sights, mounted on folding posts. It also has a short proprietary dovetail rail on the receiver which can accept telescope or night sight scope mount. Reciprocating charging handle is located at the right side of the receiver. After the last round is fired bolt is held back on a bolt catch that is released by pulling the cocking handle to the rear.

The rifle is intended to be utilized primarily with optics. The standard day optic used on the QBU-88 for military use is a Chinese 3–9×40 scope with an integral quick-release mount. In 2008, a new Chinese 6–24×44 tactical scope became available for counter-terrorism and other law enforcement use.

The riflings for the QBU-88 differs from the standard QBZ-95 assault rifle.

While the QBZ-95 has a 244 mm (9.6 in) twist to stabilize the standard 64-grain DBP-87 ball round, the QBU-88 has a faster 206 mm (8.1 in) twist to stabilize the 70-grain Heavy Ball round and dedicated Sniper load, similar to the QJY-88 general-purpose machine gun, which has progressive rifling with a final twist rate of 206 mm.

A long birdcage flash suppressor is fitted to reduce the muzzle signature. A quick-detachable bipod is clamped to the barrel when required.

== Variants ==
An export version called the QBU-97A or Type 97 is also produced and marketed for security forces of other foreign countries, and is chambered in 5.56x45mm NATO.

Instead of STANAG magazines, a modified version of QBU-88 magazine is used to feed the rounds – and STANAG magazines will not work unless modified.

The QBU-97A has recently been sighted under the designation NQU03, though it is unknown if the two differentiate in any way aside from name.

The QBU-88 can be fitted with a modified upper receiver, featuring a full-length picatinny rail. The aftermarket kit, named PEAK 88, is designed by Hong Kong engineer Lee Ka-Ho (Chinese: 李家豪).

== Users ==
- Cambodia
  - Royal Gendarmerie of Cambodia
- People's Liberation Army
  - People's Liberation Army Ground Force
    - Tibet Military District (Retired, replaced with QBU-191)
  - People's Liberation Army Navy Marine Corps (Phasing out, being replaced with CS/LR4)
  - People's Liberation Army Rocket Force Special Operations Regiment
- People's Armed Police

== See also ==
- QBU-191 - designated marksman rifle based on QBZ-191 platform.
- QBU-141 - 5.8×42mm bolt-action sniper rifle developed by China
- List of bullpup firearms
- List of sniper rifles
