= Type 81 assault rifle =

Assault rifle

Type 81
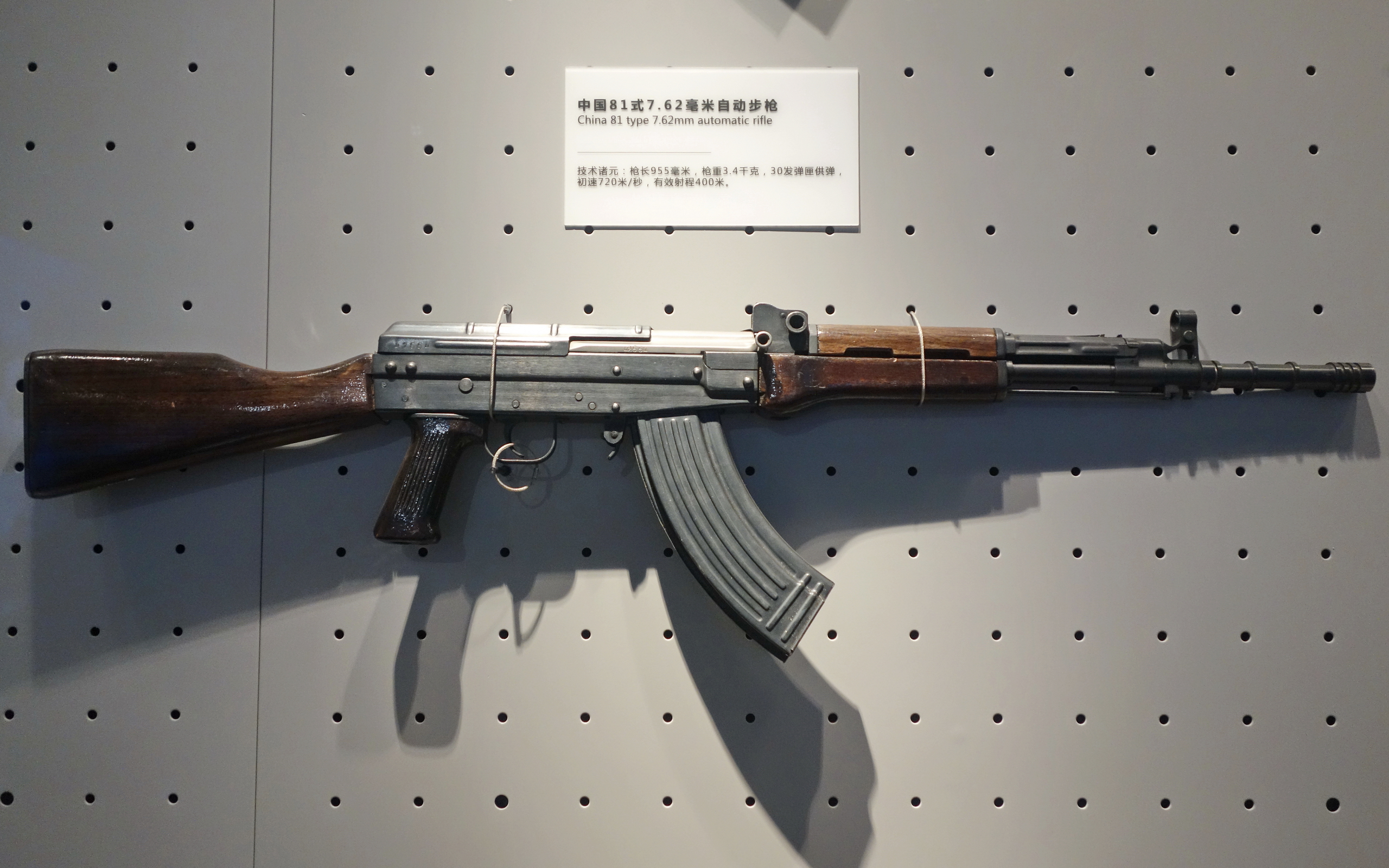
- Type 81 on display
- Type: Assault rifle Squad automatic weapon (Type 81 LMG)
- Place of origin: China

Service history
- In service: 1983–present
- Used by: See Users
- Wars: Sino-Vietnamese conflicts Cambodian–Vietnamese War; Soviet–Afghan War; Iran–Iraq War; Sri Lankan Civil War; Lord's Resistance Army insurgency Barin uprising Gulf War; Croatian War of Independence; Bosnian War; Kosovo War; Kargil War; War in Afghanistan (2001-2021); Iraq War; Boko Haram insurgency Syrian Civil War; Internal conflict in Myanmar; 2025 Cambodia‒Thailand conflict

Production history
- Designer: Wang Zijun
- Designed: 1979–1981
- Manufacturer: Manufactured by: Various state arsenals; Marketed by: Norinco; Emei; Licensed by: Bangladesh Ordnance Factories
- Produced: 1983-2023 (China) 1980s-present (Bangladesh and other countries)
- No. built: ~400,000 (Type 81)
- Variants: See Variants

Specifications
- Mass: 3.4 kg (7.50 lb) (empty, rifle); 4.5 kg (9.92 lb) (loaded, rifle); 5.15 kg (11.35 lb) (loaded, LMG)
- Length: 955 mm (37.6 in); 730 mm (29 in) (stock folded); 1,004 mm (39.5 in) (LMG)
- Barrel length: 445 mm (17.5 in); 520 mm (20 in) (LMG)
- Cartridge: 7.62×39mm
- Action: Short stroke gas piston, rotating bolt
- Rate of fire: 650 rounds/min 720 rounds/min (LMG)
- Muzzle velocity: 750 m/s (2,461 ft/s)
- Effective firing range: 400 m (1,300 ft)
- Maximum firing range: 2,000 m (6,600 ft)+
- Feed system: Proprietary 30-round detachable box magazine (20 rounds for CS/LR14), 75-round detachable drum magazine
- Sights: Adjustable iron sights

The Type 81 (Chinese: 81式自动步枪; literally; "Type 81 Automatic Rifle") is a Chinese-designed selective-fire, gas-operated 7.62×39mm assault rifle. It replaced the semi-automatic Type 56 carbine as the standard service rifle of the People's Liberation Army during the 1980s. It was also designed as a replacement to both the Type 56 assault rifle, as well as the Type 63 assault rifle, mostly being a further development and design improvement over the Type 63. Later, the Type 81 would be used under the designation Type 87 as testing for the PLA's new 5.8×42mm firearms, namely the QBZ-95.

It is a small arms family that consist of the Type 81, the Type 81-1 and the Type 81 LMG.

It was primarily in service in the mid to late 1980s during the height of the Sino-Vietnamese border conflicts.

== History ==
The PLA's first attempt to replace their aging Type 56 carbine (a Chinese license produced SKS) and Type 56 assault rifle (a Chinese license produced AK-47) was the Type 63 assault rifle. This weapon, however, ended in failure due to a variety of issues resulting in a switch back to the weapons it intended to replace. The 1979 Sino-Vietnamese War exposed the limitations of the Type 56 carbine and Type 56 assault rifle, prompting the Chinese state to sponsor the development of a more modern service rifle incorporating features of both these weapons.

The weapon was introduced into PLA service in 1981 but did not become widely distributed until the late 1980s. It replaced the Type 56 carbine and the Type 56 assault rifle, succeeding where the Type 63 failed. Its first combat use came during the latter part of the Sino-Vietnamese border conflicts of the mid-1980s. The PLA has replaced most of its Type 81s with the Type 95 or Type 03 series of weapons, though it is still in service in the reserves and armed police.

A version is used by the Bangladesh Army under the designation BD-08.

== Design ==
The Type 81 incorporates elements of the Dragunov, SKS, and AK series of rifles. The design criteria it met included accuracy of 1.78 in (4.5 cm) R_{50}, 50% of the hits within a 1.78 in (4.5 cm) diameter at 100 m (330 ft); improved controllability in full-automatic; the same reliability of the AK but a longer service life to approximately 20,000 rounds; and the ability to use AK and SKS production tooling at the time. Development was placed under Wang Zi Jun after the end of the Sino-Vietnamese border clashes in 1979.

short-stroke gas piston

The rifle retains the general layout of the AK-47 and Type 56 assault rifles, but it has an SKS-like short-stroke gas-piston design and other improvements to reduce recoil and muzzle jump, giving better firing accuracy. Notable physical differences from the Type 56 assault rifle include the stock of the rifle, the length of the action, bayonet, and the positioning of the front sight. The most easily distinguishable feature of the Type 81 is the more exposed muzzle part of the barrel. The front sight has been moved back as a modification to be able to fire 22mm rifle grenades, which are slid over the unobstructed barrel muzzle now formed into a spigot-type rifle grenade launcher.

A horizontal crossbar was added to cover the rear sight notch, as the finish on the non-hooded rear sight leaf on the Type 56 assault rifles were found to be wearing off during service in the Sino-Vietnamese conflicts (1979–1991), creating glares that disrupts the shooter's aim. The T-shaped aperture created by the addition of the crossbar could be used as a makeshift rear aperture in a pinch.

There is a significant gap between the trigger guard and the magazine on Type 81 rifles, while on the Type 56 assault rifle the magazine is adjacent to the front of the trigger guard.

The non-detachable swing-out spike-shaped bayonet of the Type 56 carbine and assault rifle was also replaced on Type 81 rifles with the detachable Type 81 knife-bayonet.

Like its predecessors, the Type 81 is a series of weapons. The Type 81 (fixed stock) and Type 81-1 (folding stock) are 7.62×39mm caliber assault rifles with 30-round magazines, and the heavier Type 81 light machine gun (LMG) fitted with a 75-round drum magazine is used in the squad automatic weapon (SAW) role. Its sight remains at the front of the LMG barrel.

The Type 81 can be fitted with a Picatinny rail, bipod, foregrip, and flashlight. One such attempt to market Picatinny rails for the Type 81 came from Bao Wa, a Hong Kong-based law enforcement supplier.

== Variants ==
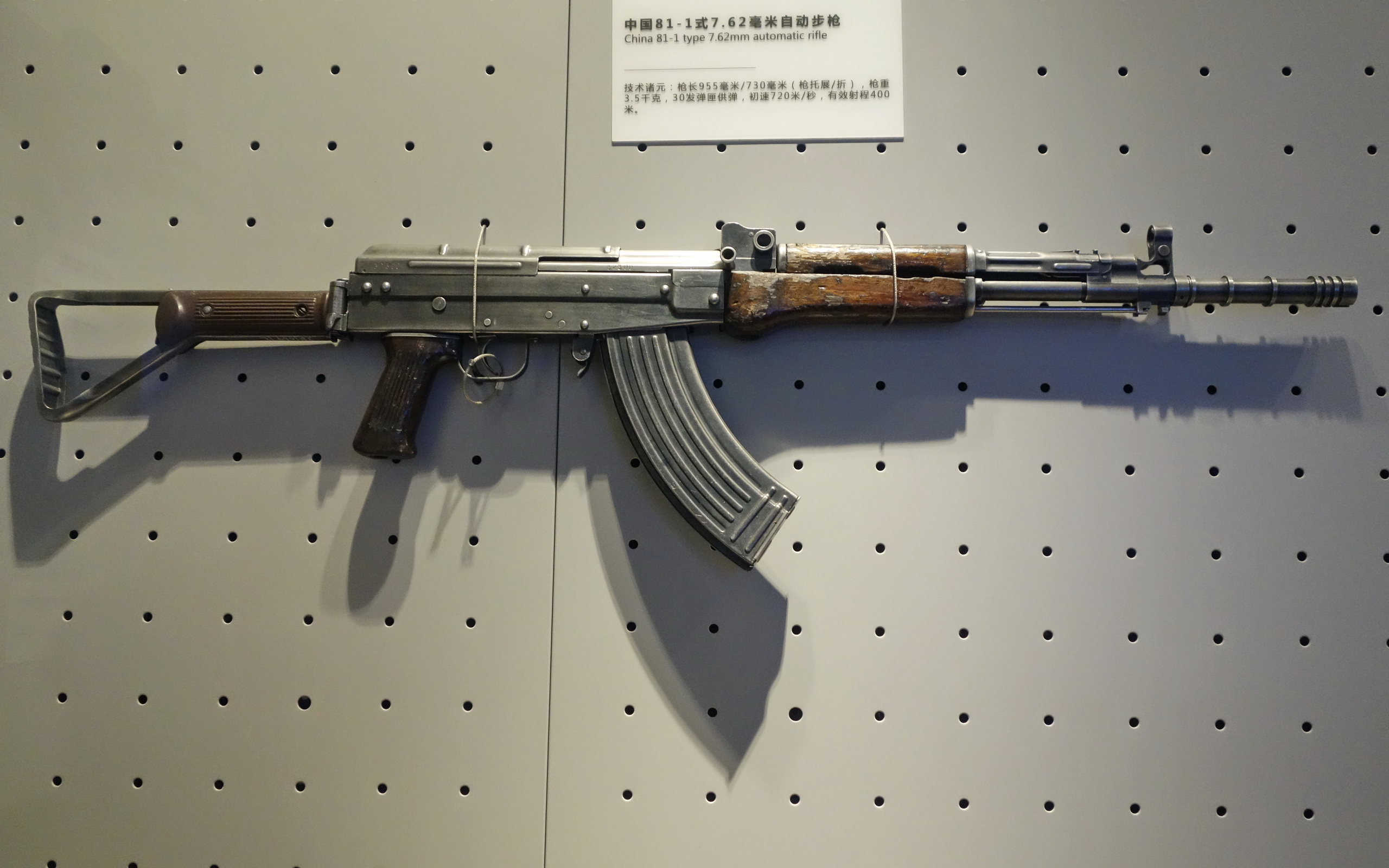
Type 81-1 rifle with the side-folding stock

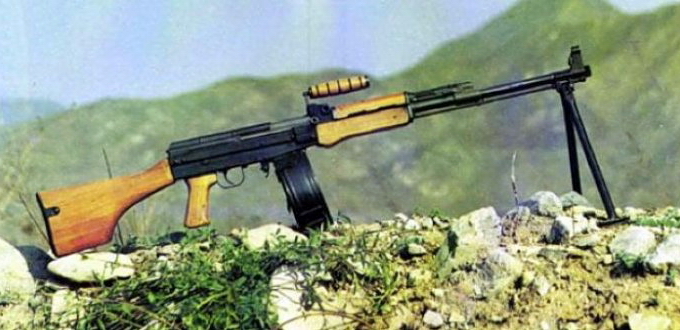
Type-81 light machine gun

=== Domestic ===
- Type 81: Initial production variant, 7.62×39mm rifle with a fixed wooden buttstock. 400,000 were produced before it was replaced by the Type 81-1.
- Type 81-1: Main production variant, 7.62×39mm rifle with a side-folding buttstock. Originally intended for paratrooper use, the Type 81-1 replaced the Type 81 with its fixed wooden buttstock as the standard-issue rifle for the PLA. The bakelite stock panels hold a rectangular cleaning kit instead of the trapdoor in the wooden buttstock.
- Type 81 LMG: 7.62×39mm squad machine gun similar to the RPK. Due to the removal of the unnecessary grenade spigot, the front sight post was relocated to the muzzle, providing a greater sight radius thus enhancing accuracy.
- Type 82: Proposal with lightened components etc.
- Type 87: Served as a development platform for the next generation of PLA small arms, being used as a test-bed for the then new 5.8×42mm DBP87 ammunition. The rifle has plastic furniture and an L-shaped folding stock. It never went into full-scale production and was soon replaced by the Type 87A. Design was finalized in 1987.
  - Type 87A/QBZ87: Prototype assault rifle designed from late 1987 to 1989 as a facelift for the Type 87 in anticipation of the 1989 National Day parade, known as the "Project 8910". The rifle features a two-piece polymer handguard with improved ventilation, polymer magazines, and polymer pistol grip. Limited production began in spring of 1989. It never went into full-scale production but has been in service with PLA special forces.
  - Type 87 LMG/QJB87: Prototype light machine gun based on the Type 87 design.
- Type 81 Tactical: Unofficial tactical upgrade package used by the PAP with picatinny rails.
- NAR-10: 7.62×51mm battle rifle marketed by Norinco in 2014, with NAR standing for "Norinco Assault Rifle". The rifle features a Picatinny-railed dust cover, quadrail handguard for accessories, and a muzzle brake. The rear sight is moved to the back of the dust cover.
  - CS/LR-14: Export designation for the NAR-10.
- Type 81A: Upgraded variant with new stock and Picatinny rails shown at the 2018 Zhuhai Airshow.

=== Civilian export ===
- T81S: Early semi-automatic only fixed stock model intended for the (civilian) U.S. market. Only 20 were imported in January 1989 before further importation was blocked by executive order. Military features such as the grenade launcher spigot and bayonet lugs are removed. The rotary dial safety was replaced with a flag-style safety in the trigger guard, similar to the SKS.
  - T81S-1: Similar model but features a side-folding stock found on the Type 81-1.
  - T81S-2: Similar model but features an under-folding stock found on the Type 56-1 assault rifle.
- EM355: 5.56×45mm variant of the T81S, intended for the (civilian) U.S. market. Only 3 Tool room prototypes were completed and imported for the 1989 SHOT show before importation was banned alongside the T81S by executive order. No magazines were ever made for them so modified 5.56×45mm AK magazines must be used instead. Manufactured by Emei (峨眉), a subsidiary of State Factory No.296 (Jianshe Industries (Group) Corporation, 建设工业集团) specializing in civilian firearms and air rifles.
  - EM356: Similar model but features a side-folding stock found on the Type 81-1.
  - EM3511: Similar model but features an under-folding stock found on the Type 56-1 assault rifle.
- Norinco M313: Semi-automatic variant of the Type 81 LMG, intended for the (civilian) U.S. market. Only a small number were imported before importation was banned along with T81S and EM355. Manufactured by State Factory No.356 (Kunming Southwest Instrument Factory, 昆明西南仪器厂) and stamped Norinco M313.
  - Norinco M313A: Straight pull bolt action hunting model based on the M313. Features simplified iron sights and a one-piece thumbhole stock with a raised cheek piece. The 180-degree throw from Safe to Fire was changed to 90 degrees to facilitate rapid safety disengagement during hunting. The magwell interface has been modified to accept a 5 or 8-round AK-pattern magazine instead of Type 81 pattern magazine.
  - Norinco M313B: Semi-automatic hunting model based on the M313. Features a one-piece thumbhole stock but retains the LMG sights and upper handguard. The 180-degree throw from Safe to Fire was changed to 90 degrees. The magwell interface has been modified to accept a 5 or 8-round AK-pattern magazine instead of Type 81 pattern magazine.
- T81SA: Semi-automatic variant in 7.62×39mm, for sale in Canada by Tactical Imports and manufactured by Jianshe Industries (Group) Corporation, formerly State Factory No.296. Barrel length has been extended to 18.7 inches (475mm) to comply with Canadian firearms regulations in order to obtain a non-restricted classification. As a result, one extra segment of gas ring was added to the spigot grenade sleeve, making it incompatible with a regular Type 81 bayonet unless modified.
  - T81-1SA: Similar model but features a side-folding stock found on the Type 81-1. Officially stamped T81SA.
  - T81SA LMG: Semi-automatic variant of the Type 81 LMG with a 20.5" (520mm) barrel, similar to the Norinco M313. Officially stamped T81SA but marketed as the T81LMG in Canada.
  - Type 81SR: Semi-automatic variant, a commercial design only sold in Canada to date, with the same heavy profile, 20.5" barrel and front sight post of the Type 81 LMG, a SVD-style stock, and a lighter trigger pull weight. Officially stamped T81SA but marketed as the T81SR in Canada.
  - Type 81M: Similar to the T81SA, but featuring the same heavy profile barrel and front sight post from the Type 81 LMG, shortened to 18.7 inches (475mm). The lower handguard features an additional finger groove and the crossbar on the rear sight was removed. A commercial design only sold in Canada to date. Officially stamped T81SA.
  - Type 81M Underfolder: Type 81M with an under-folding stock found on the Type 56-1 assault rifle. Officially stamped T81SA.

=== Foreign ===
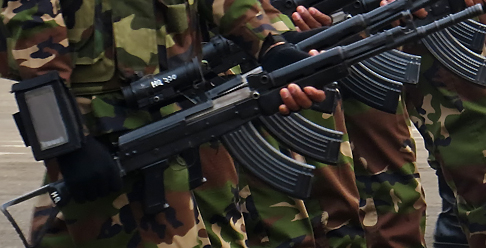
BD-08 assault rifle with collimator sight

Bangladesh

- BD-08: The BD-08 assault rifle is made under licence by the Bangladesh Ordnance Factories. BOF produces more than 10,000 BD-08 rifles per year.

Myanmar

- Kachin Independence Army produced Type 81 variants dubbed the M23. It uses polymer furniture with a Sun motif. Not much is known about their manufacturing details due to their clandestine origins. Reported to sometimes suffer from reliability problems. The handguard, grip and buttstock are made up of military green polymer material. It has a set of heat dissipation holes on the handguard. The stock has a curved shape due to the short statute of Kachins.
  - Kachin K09: Comes with black/plum polymer furniture.
  - Kachin K010: Comes with green polymer furniture.
  - Kachin K011: Dedicated indigenous 45mm rifle grenade launcher variant.
- Type 81s made by the United Wa State Army.

== Users ==
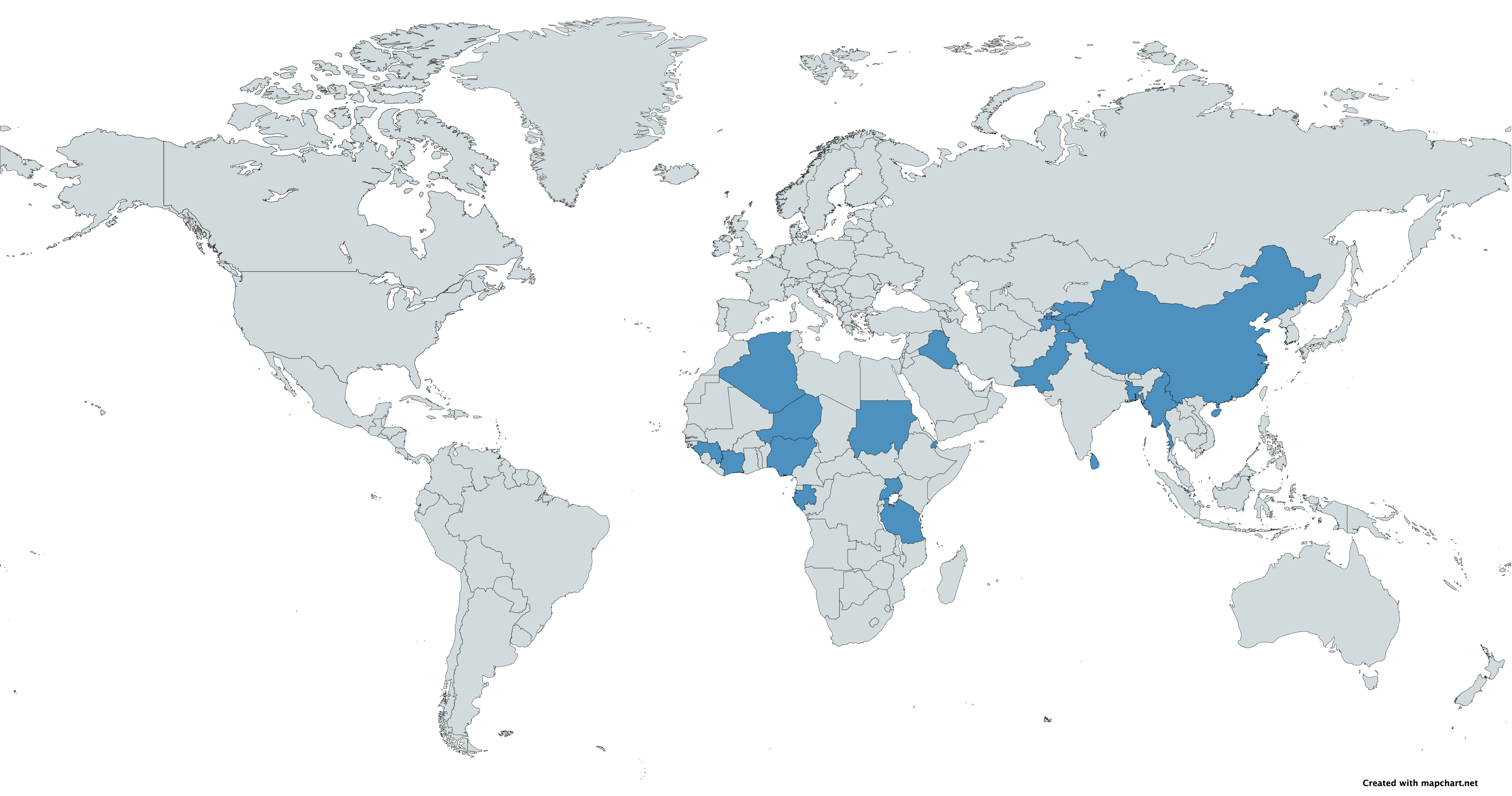
A map with users of the Type 81 assault rifle in blue

- Bangladesh: The BD-08 assault rifle is in the national inventory of Bangladesh.
- Cambodia
- China: The Type 81 is still used by second-line units.
- Gabon
- Guinea: Used by the Guinean Army and Navy
- Iraq: Used by Iraqi Police.
- Ivory Coast
- Kyrgyzstan
- Myanmar
- Niger - Niger Armed Forces also use Type 81 machine guns.
- Nigeria: Produced under license by the Defence Industries Corporation of Nigeria
- Pakistan
- Sri Lanka
- Sudan
- Syria: Used by the Syrian Arab Army, captured from rebels.
- Tajikistan: Equipped with Type 81s since 2014.
- Uganda

=== Non-state actors ===
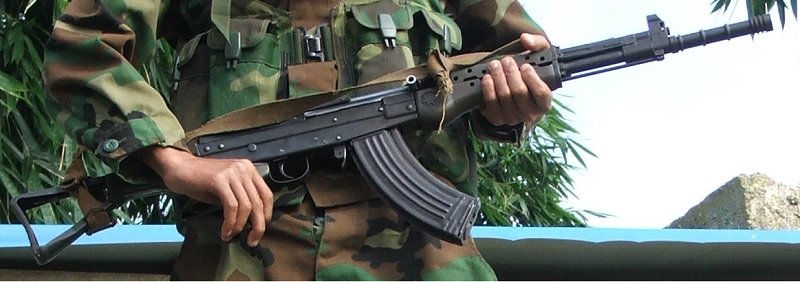
Variant of Type 81 assault rifle made by the Kachin Independence Army in Kachin State, Myanmar.

- Islamic State of Iraq and the Levant
- Kachin Independence Army
- Lord's Resistance Army
- Tamil Tigers
- United Wa State Army
- United Liberation Front of Assam: Misidentified at time as the AK 81.
- United National Liberation Front
- People's Defence Force

== See also ==
- vz. 58
- 701 rifle

== Bibliography ==
- Fontanellaz, Adrien (2020). Paradise Afire Volume 3: The Sri Lankan War 1990-1994. Helion & Company. ISBN 978-1913118624.
