= 5.8×42mm =

Chinese military intermediate cartridge

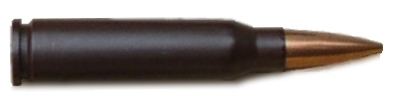
- DBP87 round
- Type: Rifle, carbine, designated marksman rifle, and light machine gun
- Place of origin: People's Republic of China

Service history
- Used by: China

Production history
- Designer: People's Liberation Army
- Designed: 1979–1987
- Produced: 1987–present
- Variants: 5.8×42mm DBP-87; 5.8×42mm DBP-95; 5.8×42mm DBP-88 heavy round; 5.8×42mm DBP10; 5.8×42mm DBP191

Specifications
- Case type: bottleneck
- Bullet diameter: 5.8 mm (0.23 in)
- Neck diameter: 6.65 mm (0.262 in)
- Shoulder diameter: 9.35 mm (0.368 in)
- Base diameter: 10.40 mm (0.409 in)
- Rim diameter: 10.42 mm (0.410 in)
- Rim thickness: 1.42 mm (0.056 in)
- Case length: 42.2 mm (1.66 in)
- Overall length: 58 mm (2.3 in)
- Case capacity: 2.11 cm^{3} (32.6 gr H_{2}O)
- Rifling twist: 240 mm or 210 mm (1 in 9.45 or 1 in 8.27)

Ballistic performance
Bullet mass/type	Velocity	Energy
4.15 g (64 gr) DBP87/95 FMJ	930 m/s (3,100 ft/s)	1,795 J (1,324 ft⋅lbf)
5 g (77 gr) DBP88 FMJ	870 m/s (2,900 ft/s)	1,892 J (1,395 ft⋅lbf)
4.6 g (71 gr) DBP10 FMJ	915 m/s (3,000 ft/s)	1,926 J (1,421 ft⋅lbf)
- Test barrel length: 557 mm (21.9 in); Source: Anthony Williams

The 5.8×42mm / DBP87 (Chinese: 弹，步枪，普通 87; pinyin: Dàn, Bùqiāng, Pŭtōng, 87, lit. 'Cartridge, Rifle, Standard, '87') is a military bottlenecked intermediate cartridge developed in the People's Republic of China. There is limited information on this cartridge, although the People's Liberation Army claims that it is superior to the 5.56×45mm NATO and Soviet 5.45×39mm cartridges. It was officially adopted in 1987.

Another variant called the DBP88 "heavy round" was designed specifically for squad automatic weapons and designated marksman rifles. The 5.8×42mm "heavy round" cartridge has the same dimensions as the standard 5.8×42mm cartridge, but utilizes a longer streamlined bullet with a heavy steel core for increased performance at extended ranges and penetration. As of 2019, all 5.8×42mm cartridge variants have been succeeded by the DBP191 variant.

== History ==
The Chinese armaments industry and the Chinese military were informed about the developments and experience that the US armed forces had during the Vietnam War with the M16 rifle and its 5.56×45mm M193 ammunition – not least because of the arms aid for Vietnam, as a result of which there was a high probability that captured US small arms and ammunition reached China. In March 1971, the so-called "Conference 713" was held in Beijing, at which future developments in the field of infantry weapons were discussed and criteria for infantry weapons and ammunition were established.

Chinese officials wanted the new ammunition to be developed to have a caliber of around 6 mm (0.24 in) and a muzzle velocity of around 1,000 m/s (3,300 ft/s). Compared to the standard 7.62×39mm cartridge, recoil and weight were to be reduced whilst accuracy and terminal ballistics had to be improved. At the "744 Conference" the caliber choice was narrowed down to either 5.8 or 6 mm (0.23 or 0.24 in). Seven different case designs were presented, which required overall cartridge lengths between 56 and 59.5 mm (2.20–2.34 in). The actual development began in 1978.

In 1979, the caliber and case length choices were determined and China started the development of the 5.8×42mm cartridge and finalized the cartridge in 1987. The 5.8×42mm / DBP87 was designed to replace the Soviet 7.62×39mm cartridges used by the People's Liberation Army (PLA). The Type 95 / QBZ-95 (Chinese: 轻武器,步枪,自动, 1995; pinyin: Qīng wǔqì, Bùqiāng, Zìdòng, 1995; lit. 'Light weapon, Rifle, Automatic, 1995') 5.8 mm caliber assault rifle, firing the 5.8×42mm / DBP87 or the improved DBP95, is now the standard-issue weapon in the PLA. The DBP87 service round was quickly supplemented in 1988 by the DBP88 round which was loaded with a heavier more aerodynamic projectile for improved extended range performance.

The 5.8×42mm is an example of an international tendency towards relatively small-sized, lightweight, high-velocity military service cartridges. Cartridges like the Belgian 5.56×45mm NATO, Soviet 5.45×39mm, and Chinese 5.8×42mm allow a soldier to carry more ammunition for the same weight compared to their larger and heavier predecessor cartridges, have favourable maximum point-blank range or "battle zero" characteristics and produce relatively low bolt thrust and free recoil impulse, favouring light weight arms design and automatic fire accuracy.

In June 2004, an improved version of the 5.8×42mm cartridge entered development as the matching ammunition for the revised assault rifle, Type 95-1. Both designs were finalized in 2010 and production began the same year. This new cartridge is known as DBP10.

To improve accuracy and barrel life the barrel was also redesigned. The number of rifling grooves was increased from 4 to 6. The diameter of the lands was slightly increased from 5.8–5.84 mm (0.228–0.230 in) to 5.82–5.86 mm (0.229–0.231 in). The groove diameter was decreased from 6.01–6.07 mm (0.237–0.239 in) to 5.98–6.02 mm (0.235–0.237 in). In addition, the twist rate in the revised 95-1 assault rifle was reduced from 240–210 mm (9.4–8.3 in).These changes reduced the rifling twist rate from 41.2 to 36 calibers.

The People's Liberation Army claims that the 5.8×42mm is superior to the 5.56×45mm NATO SS109 and the 5.45×39mm 7N6; stating it has better armor penetration of 10 mm (0.39 in) at 300 m (980 ft), a flatter trajectory, and a higher retention of velocity and energy downrange.

== Variants ==
=== DBP87 ===
The DBP87 cartridge with 4.15 grams (64.0 gr) bullets has a muzzle velocity of 930 metres per second (3,051 ft/s) from a standard barrel (Type 95 / QBZ-95, 463 mm (18.23 in) barrel length), and 940 to 960 metres per second (3,084 to 3,150 ft/s) from the Type 95 LSW (557 mm (21.92 in) barrel length). The bullet has a ballistic coefficient (G7 BC) of approximately 0.156. The DBP87 cartridge has an operating pressure of 282.7 MPa (41,000 psi).

The steel core has a diameter of 4.1 millimetres (0.16 in). In order to save cost, several compromises were made. In particular, the cartridge case is made of steel, which is cheaper than brass. To reduce the chance of rust, the case is covered in a thin layer of protective paint in dark brown. To ensure high extraction reliability, the case has a thick rim and a large extractor groove.

=== DBP88 ===
The DBP88 "heavy round" cartridge has a 5 grams (77 gr) bullet and a muzzle velocity of 870 metres per second (2,854 ft/s) from a standard barrel (Type 95 / QBZ-95, 463 mm (18.23 in) barrel length), and 940 to 960 metres per second (3,084–3,150 ft/s) from the Type 95 LSW / Type 95 SAW / QJB-95 (557 mm (21.92 in) barrel length), and 895 metres per second (2,936 ft/s) from the Type 88 / QBU-88 (640 mm (25.20 in) barrel length). The bullet has a ballistic coefficient (G7 BC) of approximately 0.210. It has an effective range of 800 metres (875 yd) and can penetrate 3 mm steel plates at a distance of 1,000 metres (1,094 yd). The DBP88 cartridge has an operating pressure of 317.2 MPa (46,000 psi).

=== DBP95 ===
The DBP95 cartridge was developed in 1995 for the QBZ-95. The DBP95 is an improved version of the DBP87 that uses a cleaner propellant and non corrosive primer. Its performance remains similar and the production costs are higher, but the negative effects on the weapon are reduced. It is basically the same round as the DBP87 other than these minor differences, and was used until 2010 when it was replaced by the DBP10.

=== DBP10 ===
The DBP10 cartridge was developed in 2010 and has a hardened steel-cored 4.6 grams (71 gr) bullet, a muzzle velocity of 915 metres per second (3,002 ft/s) from a standard barrel (Type 95 / QBZ-95, 463 mm (18.23 in) barrel length) and was designed to match nine different, then-serving 5.8×42mm chambered weapons. These weapons featured different barrel twist rates between 178 to 240 mm (7.0 to 9.4 in) and the DPB10 was optimized for the faster twist rates used in newer weapons. As such, it was introduced to consolidate and replace all previous DBP87/95 and DBP88 5.8×42mm rounds. The bullet has a ballistic coefficient (G7 BC) of approximately 0.193.

Major improvements include a non-corrosive primer, a copper-coated steel case with a copper alloy bullet jacket with a 3.8 millimetres (0.15 in) diameter hardened steel core for better penetration of body armor. It also uses a cleaner burning propellant so as not to leave residue inside the weapon after firing. However, although testing of the previous DBP87/95 5.8 mm rounds showed that they were less likely to cause serious wounds, the issue was not addressed with the new DBP10 round. DBP10 has an operating pressure of 255 to 289.4 MPa (36,980–41,970 psi). According to another source DBP10 has an operating pressure of 289.6 MPa (42,000 psi).

The DBP10 cartridge weighs 12.9 grams (199 gr). The accuracy of fire at 300 m (328 yd) (R_{50}) is stated as 75 mm (3.0 in), at 600 m (656 yd) (R_{50}) is stated as 140 mm (5.5 in) and at 800 m (875 yd) (R_{50}) is stated as 230 mm (9.1 in). R_{50} at a specific range means the closest 50 percent of the shot group will all be within a circle of the mentioned diameter at that range. The circular error probable method employed by the Chinese and other (European) militaries cannot be converted and is not comparable to the common US methods (group size of 5 or 10 successive shots fired at 100 yards) for determining accuracy.

=== DBU141 ===
The QBU-141, a small caliber sniper rifle intended to be used with 5.8×42mm DBU-141 (Mandarin: Dàn, Bùqiāng, Jūjī "Cartridge, Rifle, Sniper") high-precision ammunition in a 10-round box magazine. The specifically designed munition improves accuracy, whereas China's previous sniper/designated marksman rifles use standard machine gun rounds.

=== DBP191 ===
According to Chinese media, the new generation service rifle introduced in 2019, the QBZ-191, is chambered in 5.8×42mm. Along with the new service rifle redesigned DBP-191 ammunition was introduced that has better ballistic performance.

== Use ==
- Chinese Type 87 assault rifle
- Chinese Type 95 QBZ-95 assault rifle
- Chinese Type 95B / QBZ-95B carbine
- Chinese Type 95 LSW / Type 95 SAW / QBB-95 light support weapon / squad automatic weapon
- Chinese Type 88 / QJY-88 light machine gun
- Chinese Type 88 / QBU-88 designated marksman rifle
- Chinese Type 03 / QBZ-03 assault rifle
- Chinese Type 191 / QBZ-191 assault rifle
- Chinese Type 192 / QBZ-192 carbine
- Chinese Type 191 / QBU-191 designated marksman rifle
- Chinese QBU-141 sniper rifle
- Chinese QJS-161/QJB-201 light machine gun
- Chinese Type 11 / QTS-11 integrated combat system

== See also ==
- 5 mm caliber
- .277 Fury
- .22 Savage Hi-Power
- 6 mm SAW
- .243 Winchester
- 6.5×54mm Mannlicher–Schönauer
- 6mm BR
- List of rifle cartridges
- Table of handgun and rifle cartridges
