= CS/LR3 =

Chinese bolt-action sniper rifle

The CS/LR3 (military designation QBU-141 [Mandarin: Qīngwuqi Bùqiāng Jūjī; "Light Weapon, Rifle, Sniper"]) is a type of bolt-action sniper rifle designed and manufactured by Chinese company Norinco. The weapon is chambered with DBU-141 5.8×42mm high-precision ammunition in a 10-round box magazine. The rifle features a free-floating barrel and specifically designed munition that improves accuracy, whereas China's previous sniper rifles use standard machine gun rounds.

== Users ==
- China: People's Liberation Army Ground Force

== See also ==
- CS/LR4
- QBU-88
