= Type 80 (pistol) =

Type 80/80式衝鋒手槍
- Type: Machine pistol
- Place of origin: China

Service history
- Used by: China

Production history
- Manufacturer: Norinco
- Produced: 1980-?

Specifications
- Mass: 1160 g (unloaded)
- Length: 300 mm
- Barrel length: 140 mm
- Cartridge: 7.62×25mm Tokarev
- Caliber: 7.62 mm
- Action: short recoil operated, locked breech
- Rate of fire: 850 rounds per minute
- Muzzle velocity: 470 m/s
- Effective firing range: 100 m
- Maximum firing range: 1000 m
- Feed system: 10 or 20 round magazines

The Type 80 (Chinese: 80式衝鋒手槍; pinyin: 80 Shì chōngfēng shǒuqiāng) is a close-combat machine pistol that was used in China in the 1980s by the People's Liberation Army (PLA). It was developed by Norinco in the 1970s, influenced by the design of the German M712 Schnellfeuer.

== History ==
The Type 80 was design in 1970 as a personal defense weapon for officers and special forces team in the PLA. It was meant to replace the Type 54. The Type 80's design was finalized in 1980.

== Design ==
The Type 80 was created by refining and upgrading the design of the various Chinese copies of the imported German selective-fire M712 Schnellfeuer version of the Mauser C96 "Broomhandle" semi-automatic pistol that were produced and used in China in the 1930s.

The internal design is derived from the basic Mauser action, with a slight recoil of the barrel enabling the locking piece under the lightweight bolt. This enables the bolt to drop out of engagement and borrows from the later Westinger (rather than the Nickl) selector mechanism. There is an obvious family resemblance outlined with the C96 having the magazine well in front of the trigger, slender barrel and exposed hammer. The pistol has a permanent unregulated sight set at a distance of 50 m (the maximum effective distance when firing in bursts). The rate of fire is believed to be around 850 rounds per minute.

The pistol's fire selector switch is set to single or full auto, which is placed at the left side of the pistol. It can be loaded with either 10 or 20 round magazines.

The detachable metallic shoulder stock can be pulled to use a hidden combat knife when required to fight in close quarters. Otherwise, it can use a wooden holster/shoulder stock.

=== Disadvantages ===
The Type 80 was designed as a machine pistol for use in close combat situations. The pistol proved too unsuitable for sustained fully automatic fire. After cycling approximately thirty cartridges, the barrel would overheat.

== Bibliography ==
- Jones, Richard D.; Ness, Leland S., eds. (2010). Jane's Infantry Weapons 2010-2011. Jane's Publishing. ISBN 978-0710629081.
