= POMZ =

Soviet anti-personnel mine

The POMZ, POMZ-2 and POMZ-2M (ПОМЗ, ПОМЗ-2, ПОМЗ-2М) are three types of Soviet-made stake mounted anti-personnel fragmentation mine. The POMZ mine was used during the Second World War. It was superseded by the POMZ-2, and later by the improved POMZ-2M. These mines (and copies thereof) have been used in numerous conflicts, including the Vietnam War and the Korean War.

== Description ==
The mines consist of a small TNT explosive charge inside a hollow cylindrical-cast iron fragmentation sleeve. The sleeve has large fragments cast into the outside and is open at the bottom to accept the insertion of a wooden or plastic mounting stake. On top is a weather cap, covering a standardised fuze well, which in operation is normally armed with an pull-action fuze MUV-2 (Rus. MУВ-2) or VPF (Rus. ВПФ) pull and tilt tripwire fuze. The tripwire can be set to detonate via both pressure or pressure release.

The POMZ-2M has a threaded fuze well, while the earlier POMZ-2 was unthreaded and the fuze and igniter would sometimes fall out if the mine was disturbed. The POMZ-2 has 6 rows of square preformed fragments, while the POMZ-2M has 5 rows and is slightly shorter.

The crude fragmentation jacket produces an uneven fragmentation effect. The effective radius of the mine is often quoted as four meters at 360 degrees, but a small number of large fragments may be lethal at ranges far exceeding that.

The wooden stakes tend to rot in tropical climates, leaving the mine, if armed, in an extremely unpredictable state.

== Variants ==
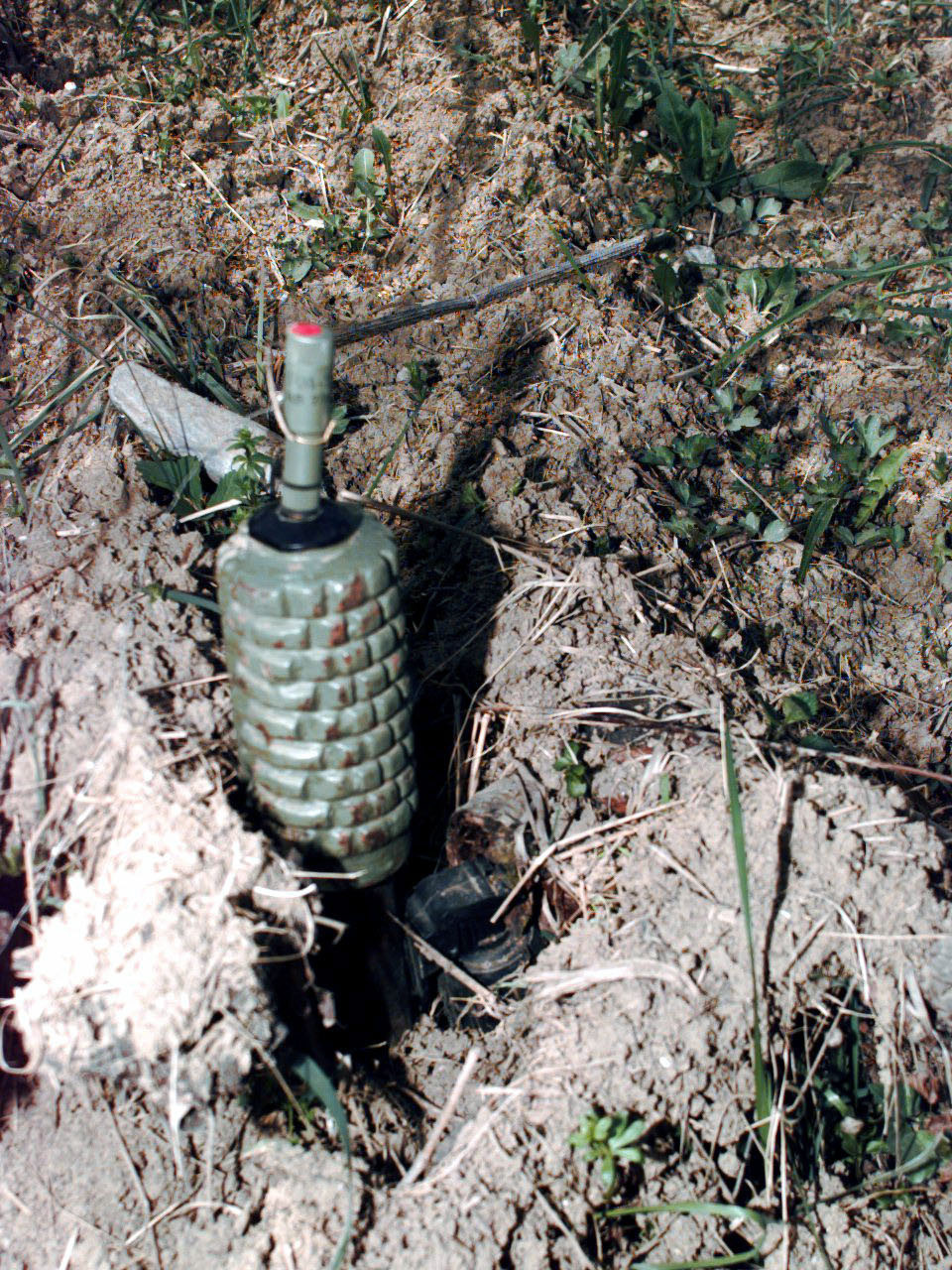
Yugoslav PMR-2A variant of POMZ anti-personnel mine, Balkans 1996. Note this mine has been booby trapped with a hand grenade.

Being of simple construction, these mines have been widely copied, including non-standardised patterns from informal guerrilla workshops. Some mass-produced copies:

- Type 58 and Type 59, People's Republic of China (POMZ-2 and POMZ-2M)
- MAP and Model 15 (POMZ-2 and POMZ-2M copies)
- PMR-1 and PMR-2A, Yugoslavia
- PP Mi-SK, Czechoslovakia (POMZ-2, used with an RO-1 fuze)
- MM-1, Myanmar (POMZ-2)
- MBV-78A1, Vietnam (POMZ-2)
- PMFH-1, PMFH-2, Cuba (POMZ-2 copies)

== Specification ==
These specifications of a POMZ-2 and POMZ-2M are typical for their various copies

	POMZ-2	POMZ-2M
Diameter	60 mm	
Height of case	130 mm	107 mm
Height of stake	~300 mm but easily varied	
Weight	2.3 kg	1.77 kg
Charge	0.75 kg rod of cast TNT	
Fuze	MUV series tripwire (MUV and MUV-2: 0.5–1 kg; MUV-3 and MUV-4: 1.5–6 kg)	
Tripwire length	4 or 8 m	5 or 10 m
Effective radius	4–9.5 m	4–8.5 m
Operating temperature	−60 to +60 °C	−40 to +50 °C

== Packaging ==
The POMZ 2M comes packed in a rectangular wooden box which has a clamp in each corner to lock on the lid. It holds eight mine bodies, eight stakes, eight 0.75 kg charges, tripwire, and eight MUV series fuzes complete with detonators.
