= QBZ-03 =

Chinese assault rifle

QBZ-03 assault rifle (Qīngwǔqi Bùqiāng Zìdòng)
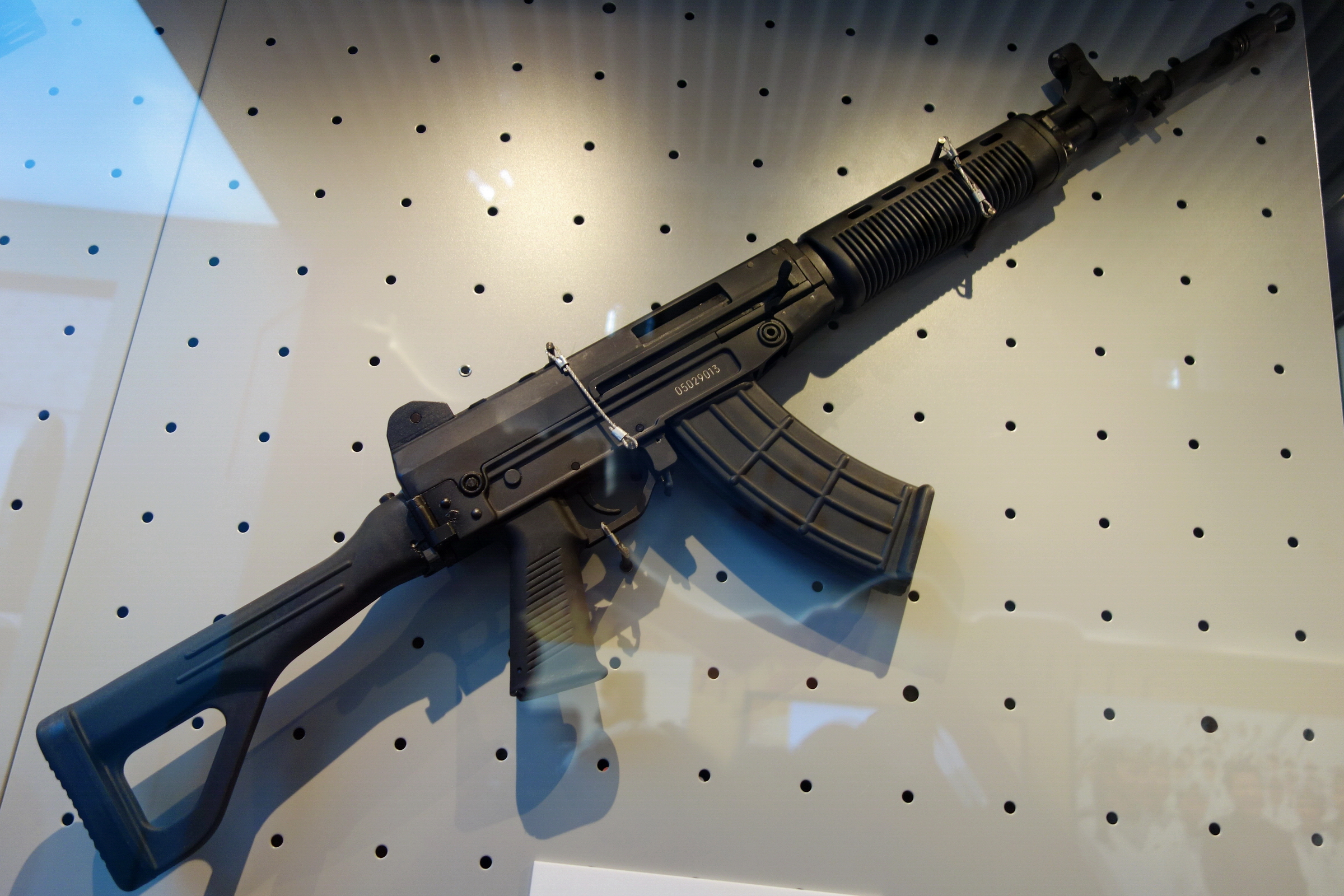
- QBZ03 automatic rifle
- Type: Assault rifle
- Place of origin: China

Service history
- In service: 2003–present

Production history
- Manufacturer: Norinco
- Produced: 2003–present

Specifications
- Mass: 3.5 kg (7.7 lb) (unloaded)
- Length: 950 mm (37 in) with stock extended, 725 mm (28.5 in) with stock folded
- Barrel length: 440 mm (17 in)
- Cartridge: 5.8×42mm DBP87; 5.56×45mm NATO
- Action: Gas operated, rotating bolt
- Rate of fire: 700–750 rounds/min
- Muzzle velocity: 930 m/s (3,050 ft/s)
- Effective firing range: 500 m (550 yd)
- Feed system: 30-round detachable box magazine
- Sights: Fixed Type 56 style front sight, flip-up diopter rear sight

The QBZ-03 (Mandarin: Qīngwǔqi Bùqiāng Zìdòng—"轻武器""步枪""自动"—"light rifle automatic") assault rifle, also known as the Type 03, is a Chinese gas operated, selective-fire assault rifle designed and developed for the 5.8×42mm DBP87 round.

Unlike the bullpup QBZ-95, the QBZ-03 has a conventional design. It is designed to be easily used by police officers and soldiers already familiar with previously issued assault rifles.

== History ==
The QBZ-03's design was finalized in December 2003 and it was given the name designation Type 03. It appears to be a continuation of the Type 87. Public information regarding the rifle was first reported in the November 2004 issue of "Weapon Knowledge".

Plans to develop the QBZ-03 were made over concerns made from reports with the use of the QBZ-95.

== Design details ==
The QBZ-03 has a faster rate of fire compared to the QBZ-95. Operating system is similar to Type 81 assault rifle featuring rotating bolt locking and short-stroke gas piston. The QBZ-03 has a folding stock.

In 2015, the manufacturer displayed a version with a quad-rail hand guard; the short rear section screws onto the upper receiver.

The gas block has two position regulator and a hooded front sight with a flip-up rear diopter sight.

== Variants ==
=== T03 ===
The T03 is an export variant chambered in 5.56×45mm NATO cartridge.

=== EM3513 ===
The EM3513 is semi-automatic export variant, chambered in 5.56×45mm NATO cartridge. First introduced in 2005 by the China Jing-She. An Import-Export and Jiang-She Group companies, the variant is fed by STANAG magazines and has an integrated three-round burst mode.

=== QTS-11 OICW Upgrade ===
In February 2011, photos appeared of the QTS-11, a combination of the Type 03 assault rifle with a 20 mm airburst grenade launcher. This made China the third country to develop an airburst infantry weapon, after the United States and South Korea.

== Users ==
- China
  - People's Liberation Army
    - People's Liberation Army Ground Force border defense units
    - People's Liberation Army Rocket Force
    - People's Liberation Army Marine Corps
  - Militia
  - People's Armed Police

=== Non-state users ===
- United Wa State Army
