= QBZ-191 =

Chinese assault rifle

Type 191 automatic rifle
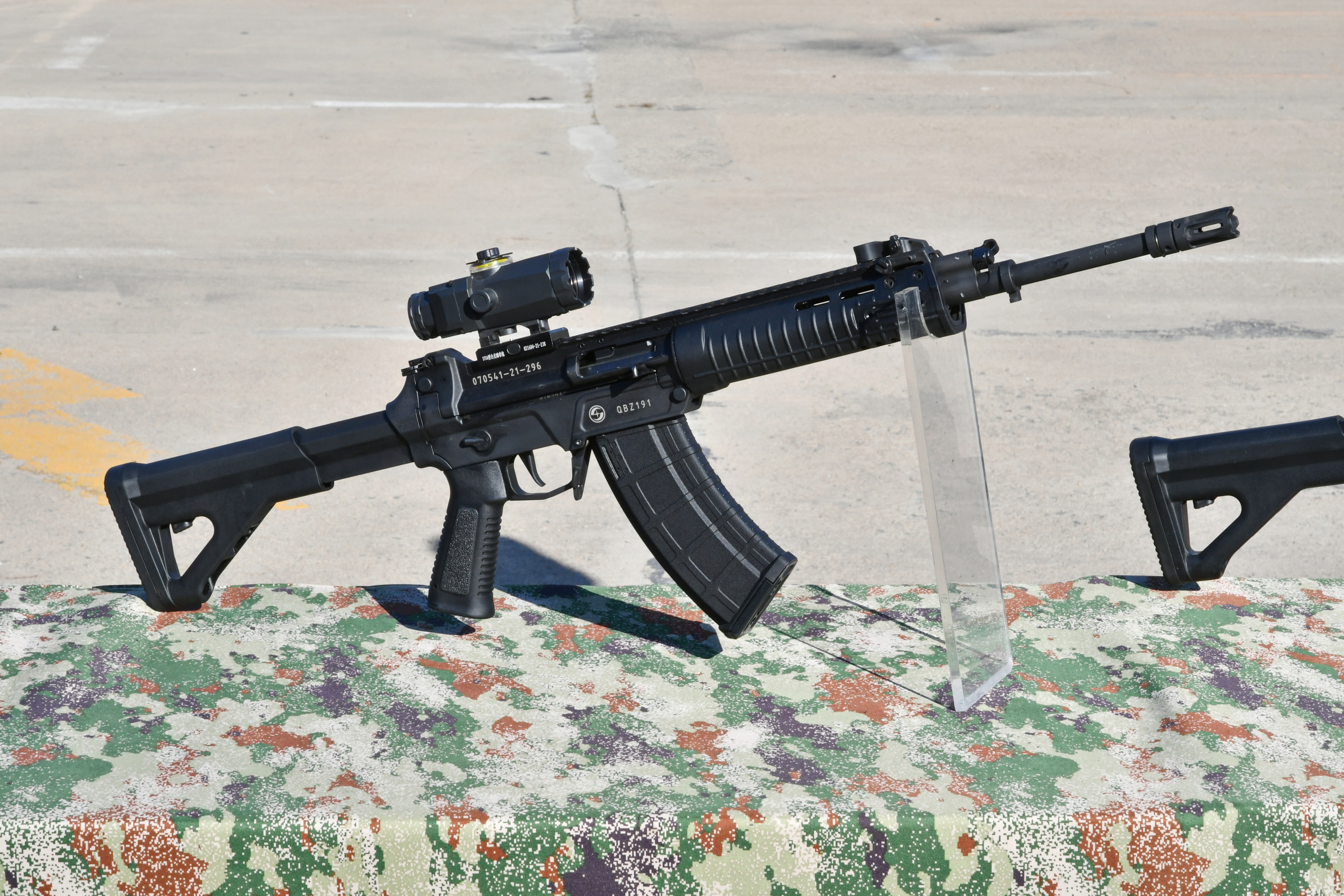
- QBZ-191 rifle with QMK-171A prism sight
- Type: Assault rifle Carbine (QBZ-192); Designated marksman rifle (QBU-191)
- Place of origin: China

Service history
- In service: 2019–present
- Used by: See Users

Production history
- Designer: 208 Research Institute
- Manufacturer: Chongqing Jianshe
- Variants: See Variants

Specifications
- Mass: 3.1 kg (6.8 lb) (w/ empty magazine)
- Barrel length: 368 mm (14.5 in) (QBZ-191); 265 mm (10.4 in) (QBZ-192); 550 mm (21.7 in) (QBU-191)
- Cartridge: 5.8×42mm; 5.56×45mm; 7.62×39mm; 7.62×51mm
- Action: Gas-operated short-stroke piston
- Rate of fire: 750 rounds/min cyclic
- Effective firing range: 400–600 m (437–656 yd) (QBZ-191); 800 m (875 yd) (QBU-191)
- Feed system: 30-round detachable box magazine; 75-round detachable drum magazine
- Sights: Flip-up iron sights; QMK-152 prism sight (3×); QMK-171A prism sight (3×); QMK-191 telescopic sight (3×–8.6×); IR5118 thermal scope (1×); Picatinny rail available for other optics

The QBZ-191 (Chinese: 191式自动步枪; pinyin: Yāo jiǔ yāo Shì Zìdòng Bùqiāng) is a Chinese assault rifle chambered for the 5.8×42mm intermediate cartridge, designed and manufactured by Chongqing Jianshe.

== History ==
The Chinese military initiated the development of conventional-layout service rifles in 2014, with multiple manufacturers involved in the development and bidding process. Various prototypes of the new weapon platform were leaked online in 2016 and 2017.

The QBZ-191 rifle was designed by Norinco's 208 Research Institute, which also designed the QBZ-95 rifle. According to the director of the 208 Research Institute, QBZ-191 is a component of the new "Integrated Soldier Combat System" (Chinese: 单兵综合作战系统), which aims to overhaul the PLA's infantry equipment.

The QBZ-191 was formally revealed at the 70th Anniversary National Day military parade on 1 October 2019, carried by personnel of the PLA Ground Force and People's Armed Police.

=== Adoption ===
In 2021, Janes Information Services reported that QBZ-191 was set to replace the QBZ-95 and QBZ-03 in PLA service as its new-generation service rifle.

The QBZ-191 is designated as part of the Type 20 (Chinese: 20式; pinyin: 20 Shì) weapon family by the People's Liberation Army.

==== Foreign interest ====
During the "Laos-China Friendship Shield-2024" military exercises in July 2024, Chinese troops presented the QBZ-191 to their Laotian counterparts. The Royal Thai Army reportedly took interest in purchasing an export variant in 2025.

During the "Karakoram-2026" joint military exercise, Pakistan Army took interest in the rifle, as Pakistani soldiers were seen testing and training with it.

== Design ==
Compared to the bullpup QBZ-95, the QBZ-191 uses a conventional configuration similar to the QBZ-03, with greatly improved ergonomics, ambidextrous usability, and better reliability across different environments.

=== Assembly ===
The QBZ-191 features a full-length Picatinny rail on the top for mounting optics. The rifle is also equipped with backup iron sights that can be folded down when not in use. The main body is divided into the upper and lower receivers, both are made of aluminium alloy and connected by two assembly pins, while the handguard, pistol grip and telescoping stock are made of polymer material.

The QBZ-191's reciprocating charging handle is located on the right side, while the bolt-release button sits on the left, above the "rock-and-lock" magazine insertion well.

=== Operation ===
The QBZ-191 features a short-stroke piston gas-operation design with rotating bolt. The rotating bolt has four locking lugs and a helical cam-in locking mechanism. A three-position gas regulator is located at the gas block attached to the handguard via dovetails.

The QBZ-191's fire control group is a self-contained modular unit with a fire selector in the order of safe, full auto, and semi-automatic firing. The QBZ-191 has a full-auto rate of fire at approximately 750 rounds per minute. The selective fire is retained on the QBU-191 designated marksman rifle, allowing the conversion to a light support weapon.

==== Ergonomics ====
The QBZ-191 has improved ergonomics, modularity, and customization options, featuring a 4-position adjustable buttstock, ambidextrous fire selector, and a lengthened magazine release lever located in front of the trigger guard for speed-reloading or easier manipulation when wearing gloves.

=== Ammunition ===
The QBZ-191 rifle is chambered in the Chinese-proprietary 5.8×42mm caliber with a redesigned DBP-191 ammunition that has better ballistic performance at medium to long ranges.

The QBZ-191 family can also accept older types of 5.8×42mm ammunition.

==== Feeding ====
The weapon platform, including both the carbine and marksman rifle, can also feed from various types of magazines, including the new transparent 30-round polymer magazine for better grip and a transparent ammunition-checking window (with a design similar to that of Magpul PMAG), older 30-round QBZ-95 magazines, and from the 75-round magazines of the QJB-95 light support weapons. There's also a new 100-round drum magazine developed for the weapon family.

=== Accessories ===
The QBZ-191's frontal handguard features provisions at its 3, 6 and 9 o'clock positions for customization, which allow small sections of Picatinny rails to be selectively installed through screw holes, so that various accessories such as flashlight, laser module, foregrip, bipod, and a type of grip pod with button controls for the integrated infantry combat system can be attached.

The weapon platform can also be mounted with bayonets, suppressors, and under-barrel grenade launchers. A dedicated laser designator module has been developed for the weapon platform.

==== Optics ====
The weapon comes standard with new 3× daylight prismatic optics called QMK152 and QMK-171A, while a thermal sight is also available.

The DMR variant is equipped with a new 3–8.6× scope called QMK-191, and the weapon can also be equipped with the IR5118 digital night vision/thermal scope. Third-party handguards are available.

== Variants ==
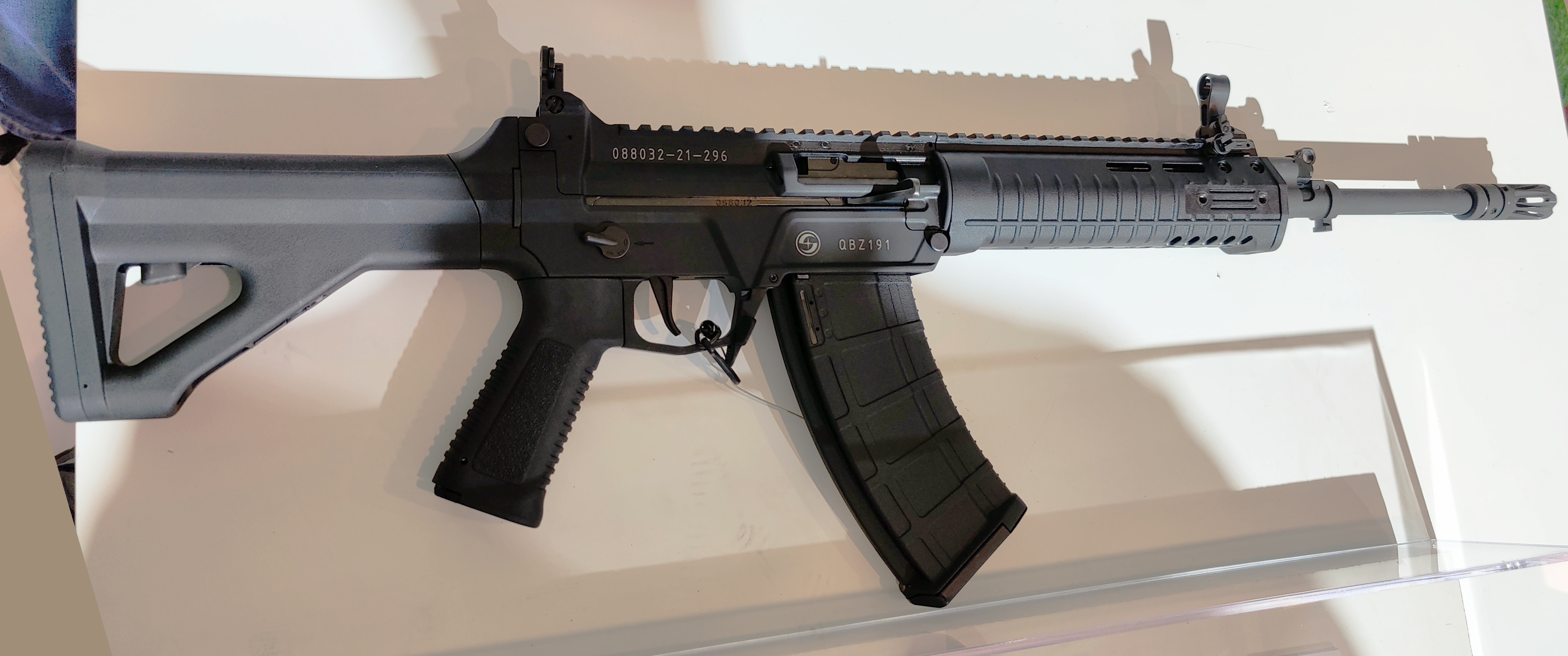
A QBZ-191 at the China International Aviation & Aerospace Exhibition, 2021

The QBZ-191 platform features various barrel lengths and handguard configurations. The rifle has been designed into main three variants: a standard rifle version with a 368.3 mm (14.5 in) barrel, a carbine version with a 266.7 mm (10.5 in) barrel called QBZ-192, and a long-barreled DMR version called the QBU-191.

=== QBZ-191 ===
Assault rifle with a 14.5 in (368.3 mm) barrel.

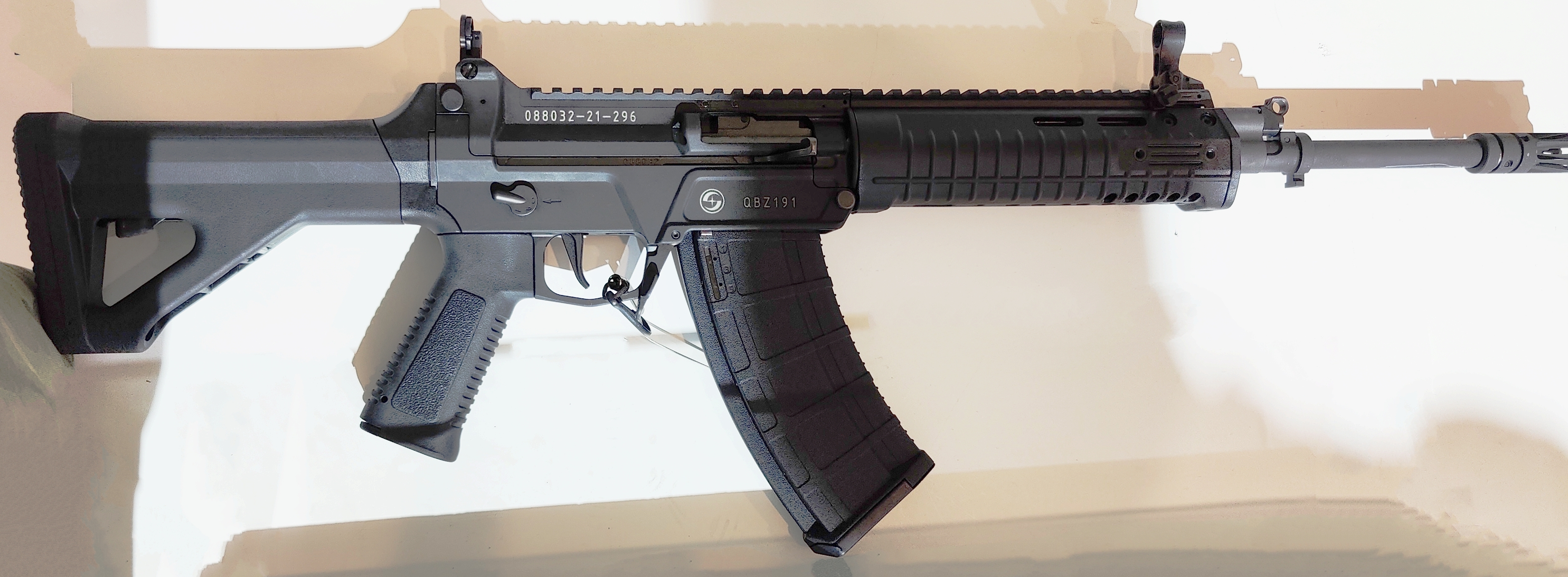
A QBZ-191 at the China International Aviation & Aerospace Exhibition, 2021

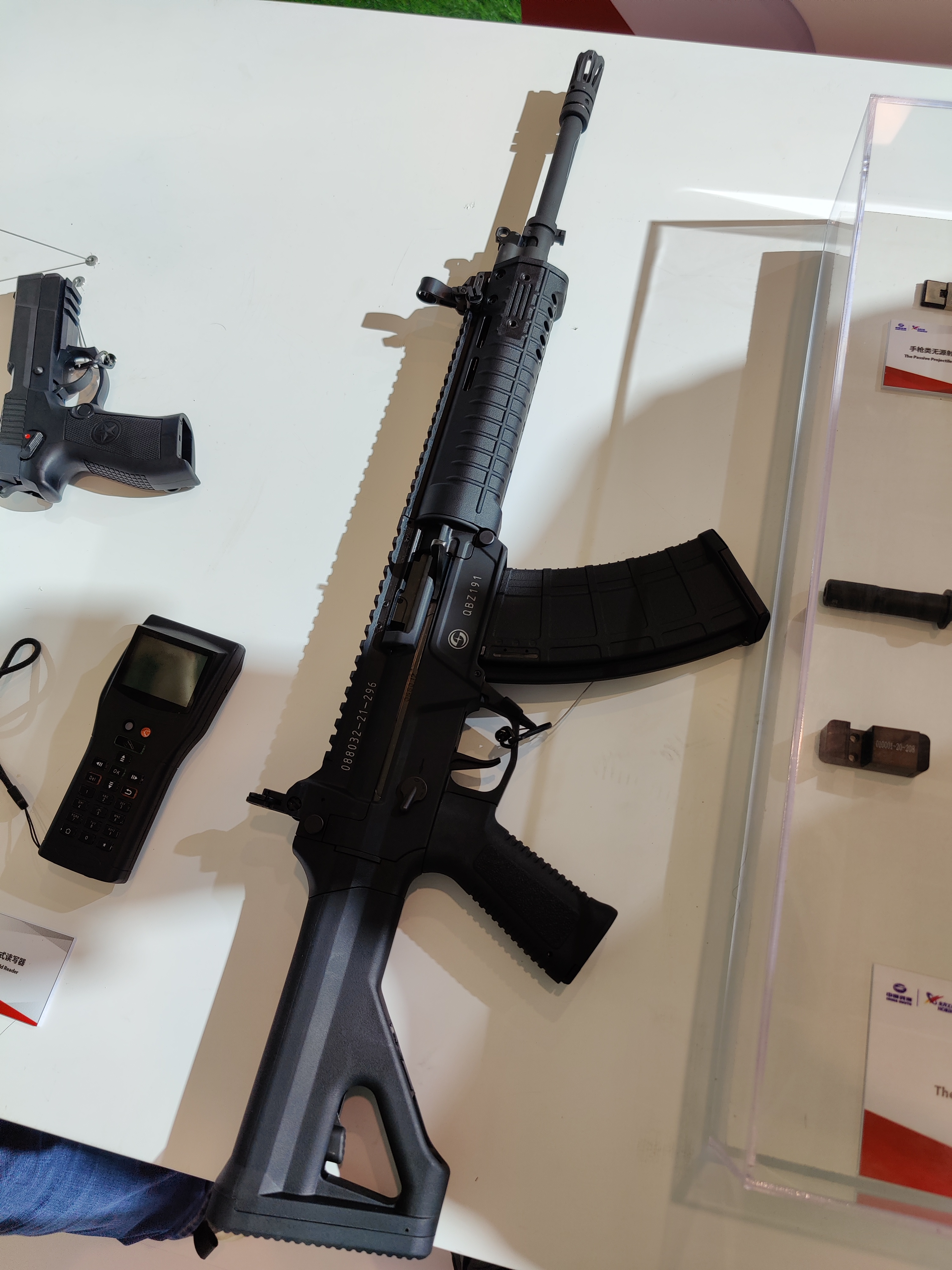
A QBZ-191 at the China International Aviation & Aerospace Exhibition, 2021

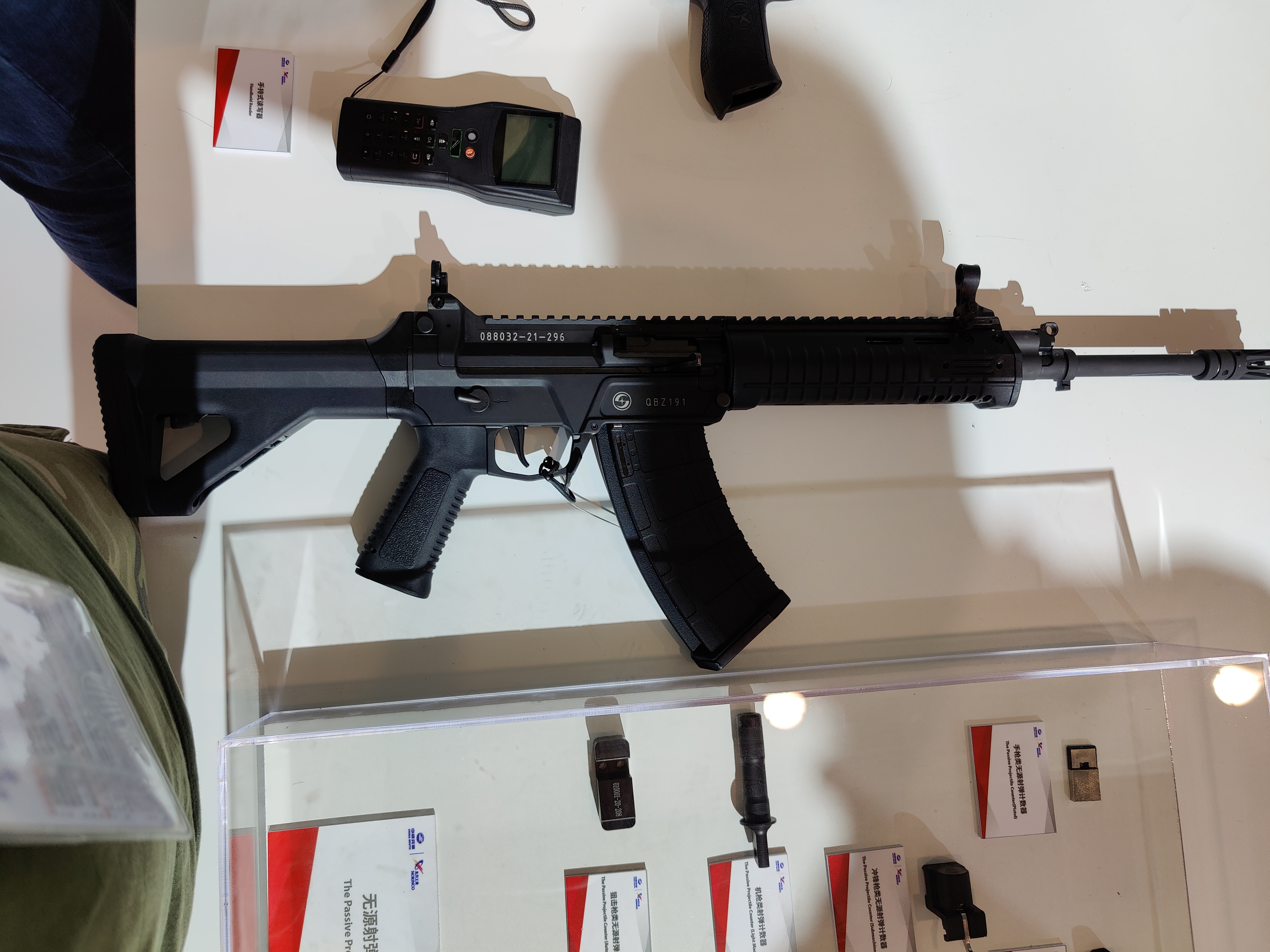
A QBZ-191 at the China International Aviation & Aerospace Exhibition, 2021

==== CS/LR41 ====
Export designation, chambered in 5.8×42mm.

=== QBZ-192 ===
Carbine variant with a 10.5 in (266.7 mm) barrel.

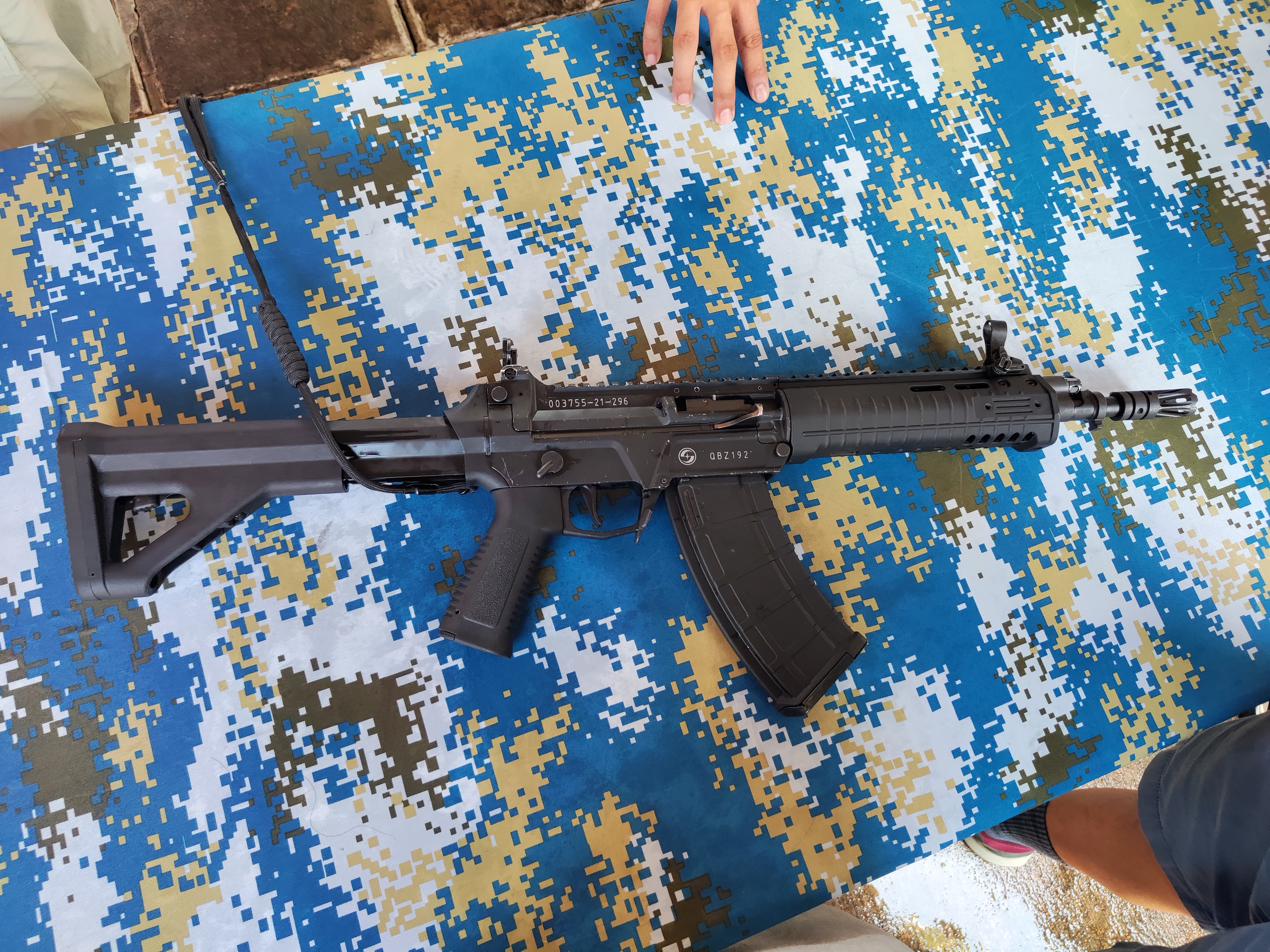
QBZ-192 rifle with stock extended

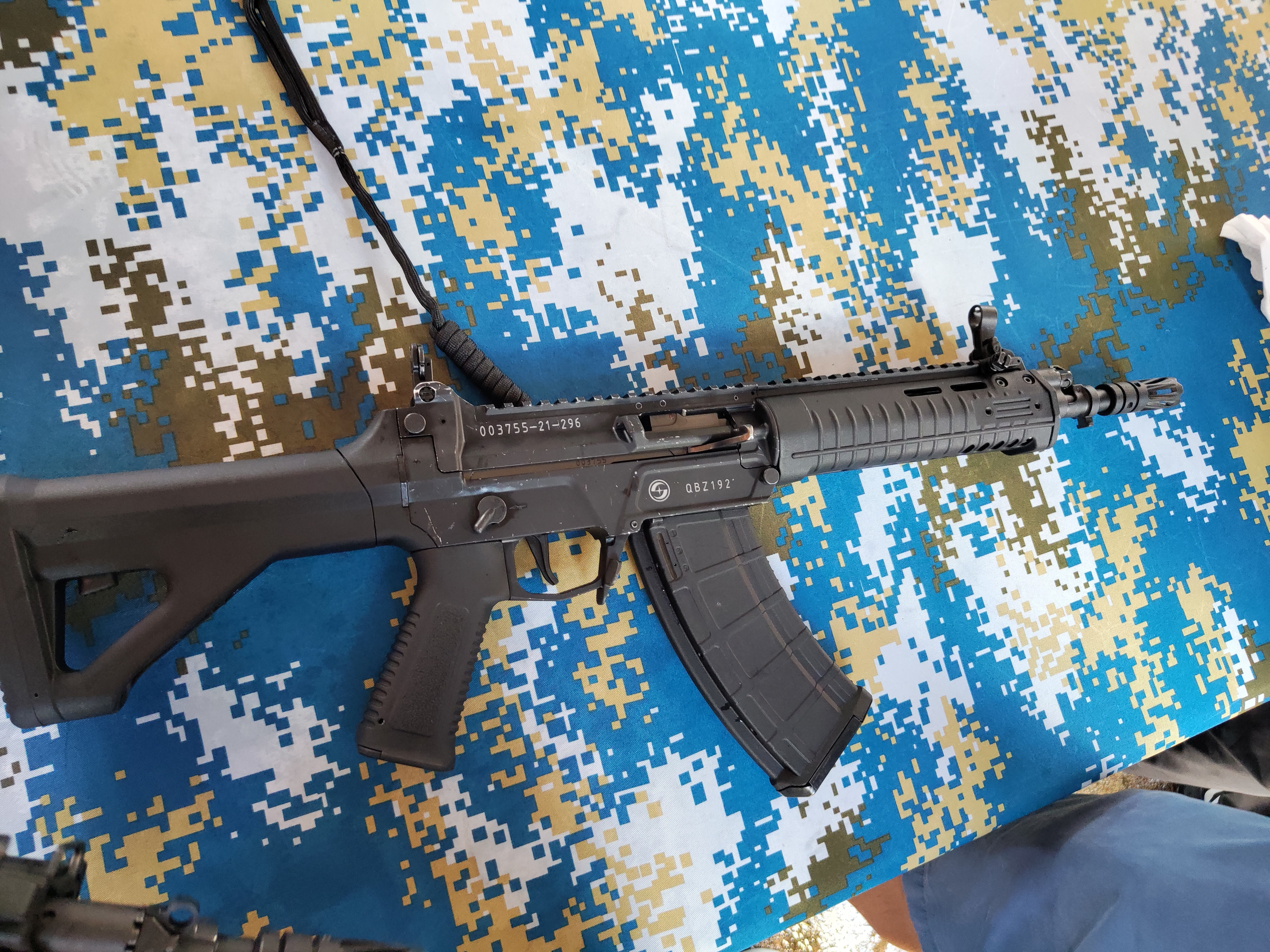
QBZ-192 rifle with stock collapsed

==== CS/LR41A ====
Export designation, chambered in 5.8×42mm.

=== QBU-191 ===
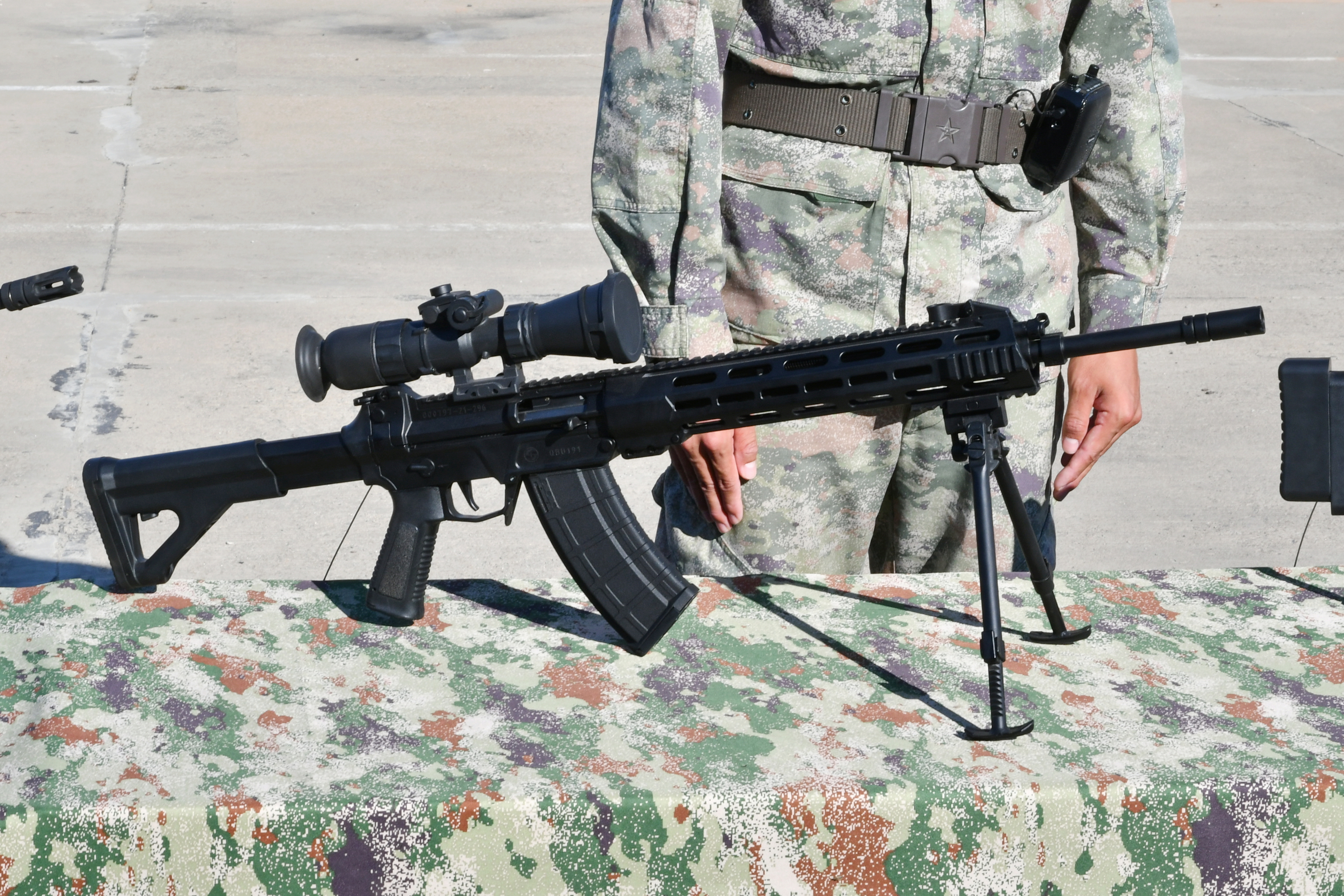
QBU-191 with free-floating barrel, extended handguard, and QMK-191 scope

Designated marksman rifle with an 800 m (870 yd) effective range.

The QBU-191 is fitted with an accurized long, heavy free-floating barrel, extended aluminum alloy handguard, 30-round box magazine, and a QMK-191 variable-magnification (3–8.6×) telescopic sight.

Selective fire with full-auto mode is retained on the marksman rifle, improving its fire suppression capability.

==== CS/LR41B ====
Export designation for the QBU-191, chambered in 5.8×42mm.

=== QBA-221 ===
Magazine-fed, semi-automatic shotgun design based on the QBZ-191.

=== Export models ===
==== CS/LR42 ====
QBZ-191 variant chambered in 5.56×45mm NATO.

==== CS/LR42A ====
QBZ-192 variant chambered in 5.56×45mm NATO.

==== CS/LR43 ====
QBZ-191 variant chambered in 7.62×39mm.

==== CS/LR43A ====
QBZ-192 variant chambered in 7.62×39mm.

==== CS/LR44 ====
QBU-191 variant chambered in 7.62×51mm NATO.

==== QBZ-191 6.8mm Prototype ====
QBZ-191 variant chambered in an unknown type of 6.8 mm (0.27 in) ammunition.

== Gallery ==
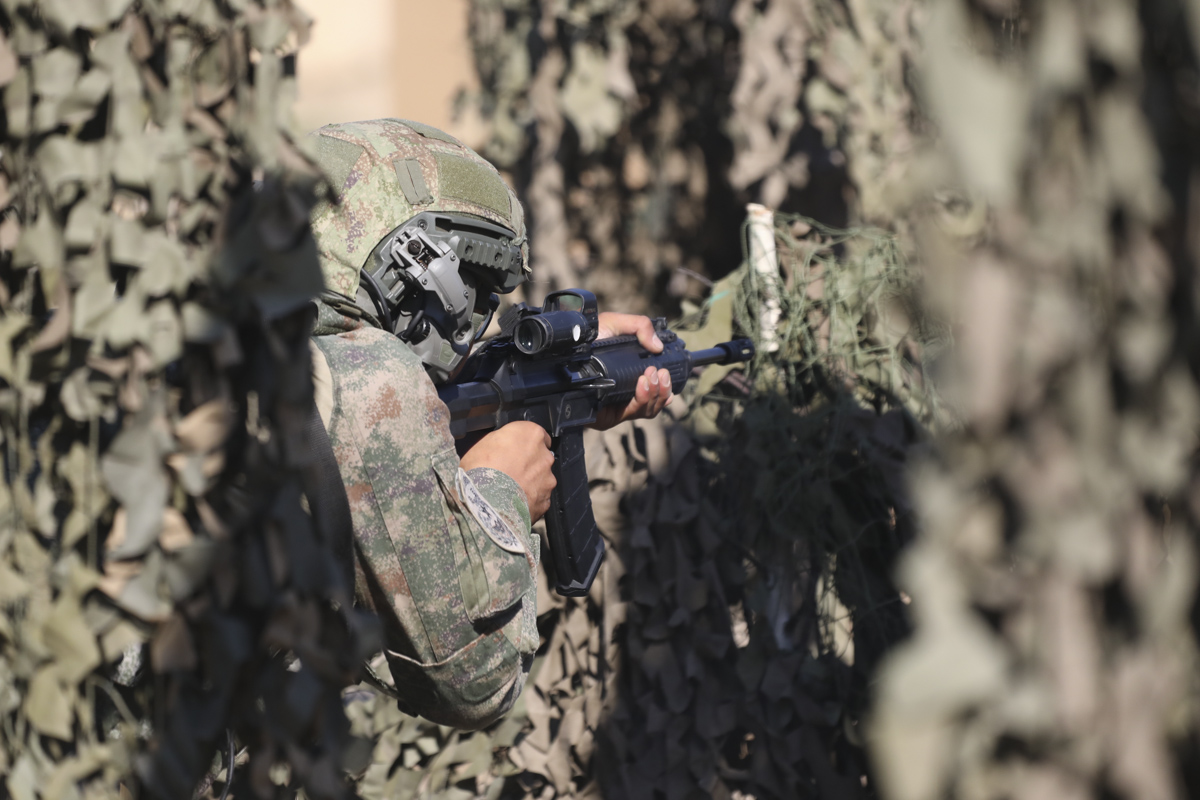
A PLAGF soldier armed with a QBZ-191 rifle during the 2021 International Army Games

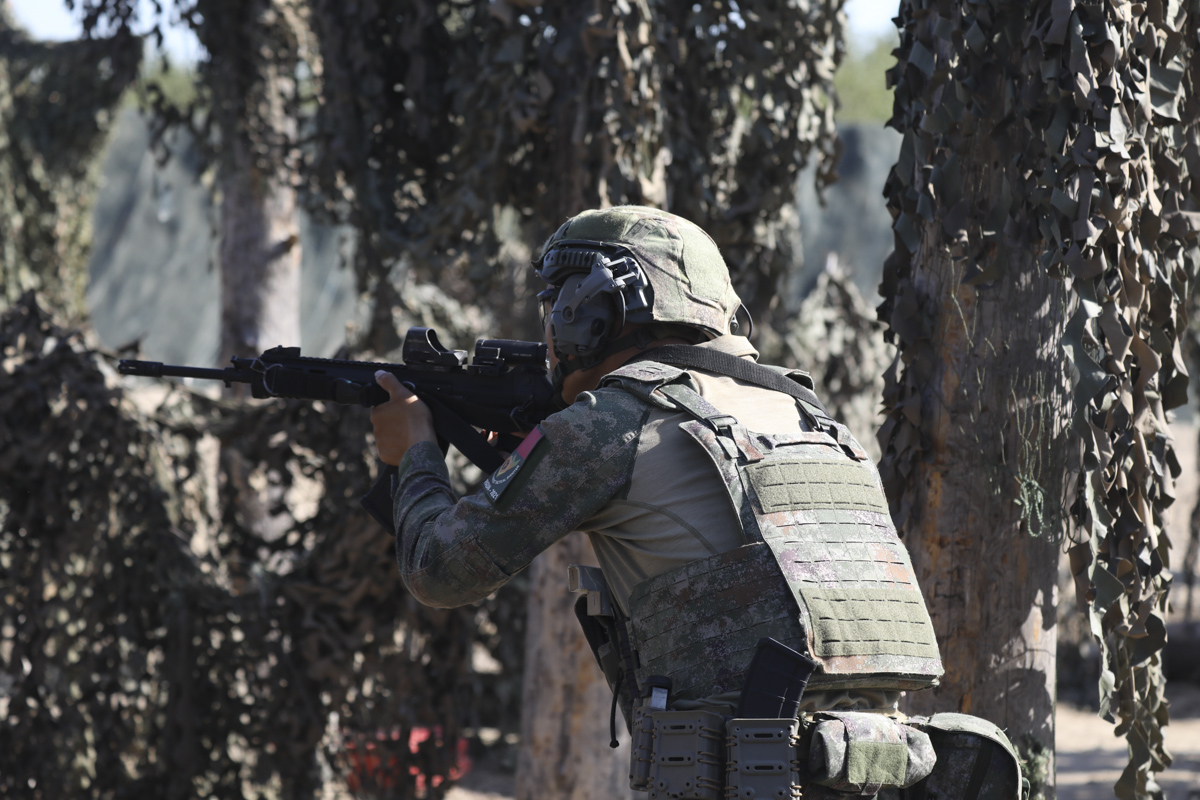
A PLAGF soldier armed with a QBZ-191 rifle during the 2021 International Army Games

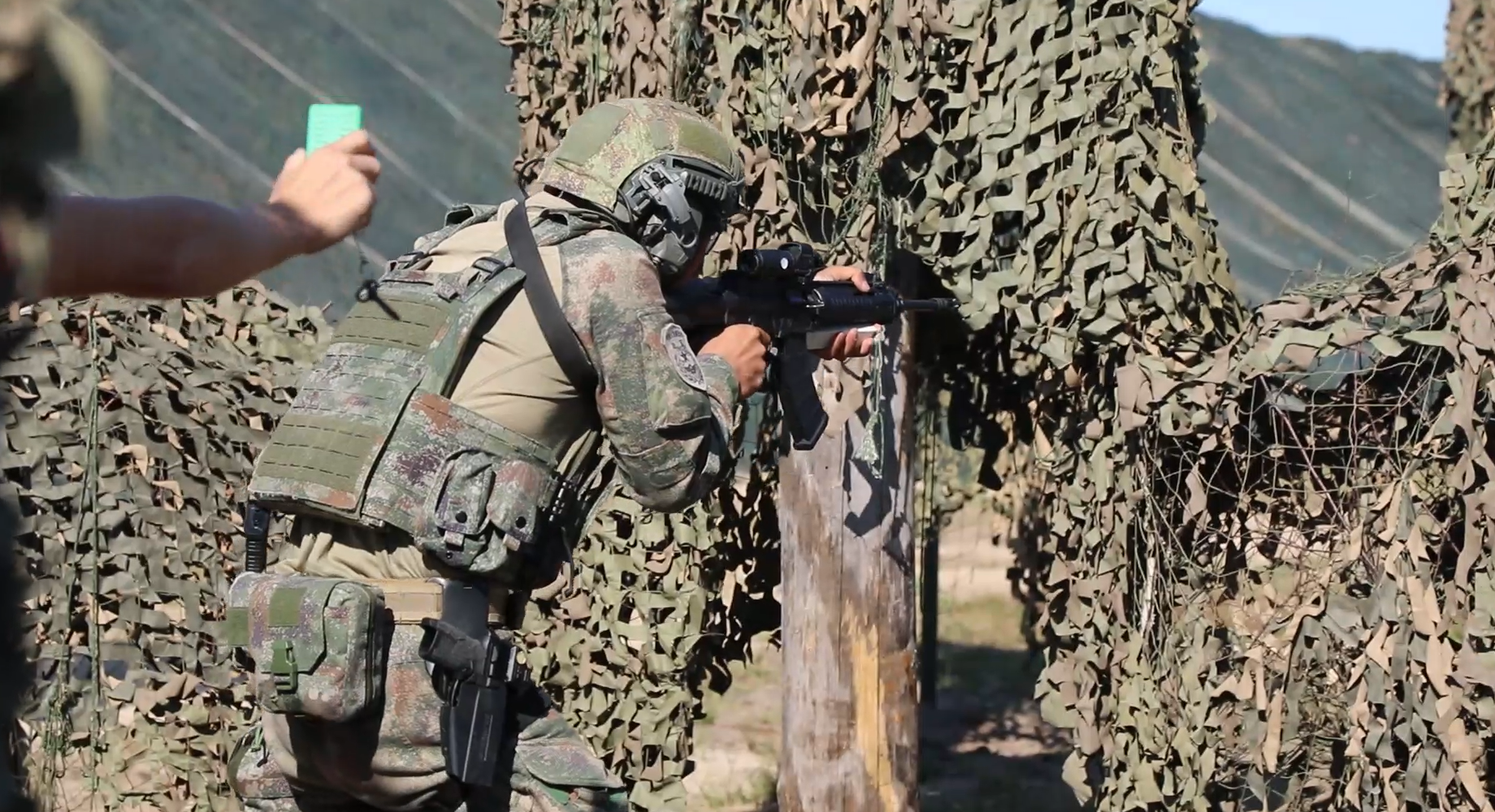
A PLAGF soldier armed with a QBZ-191 rifle during the 2021 International Army Games

== Users ==
- China: Being adopted by the People's Liberation Army and the People's Armed Police.
  - Hong Kong: Used by the Hong Kong Police Force for ceremonial purposes since 2023.
  - Macau: Used by the Public Security Police Force for ceremonial purposes since 2026.
