= General-purpose machine gun =

Machine gun adaptable for several light and medium roles

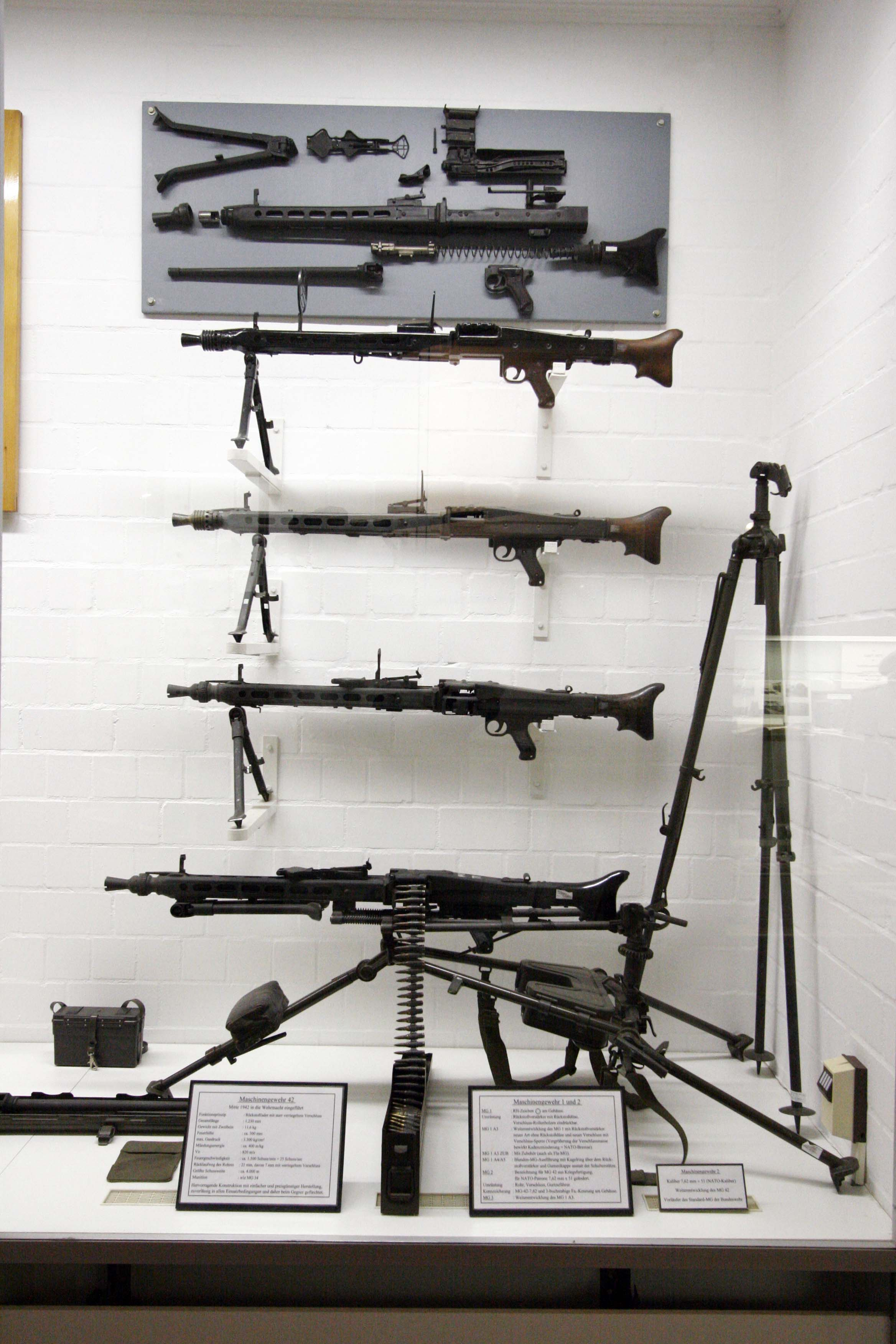
The MG 42 is one of the earliest general-purpose machine guns; it can be fitted with either a bipod or tripod, with the tall tripod (shown on the right) designed for anti-aircraft use.

A general-purpose machine gun (GPMG) is an air-cooled, usually belt-fed machine gun that can be adapted flexibly to various tactical roles. Many medium machine guns are also considered general-purpose machine guns as they are broadly useful across a variety of infantry roles and can be mounted to a wide range of vehicles, aircraft, or static mounts; however the overlap is not complete, as not all MMGs are GPMGs and not all GPMGs are MMGs. A GPMG typically features a quick-change barrel design calibered for various fully powered cartridges such as the 7.62×51mm NATO, 7.62×54mmR, 7.5×54mm French, 7.5×55mm Swiss and 7.92×57mm Mauser, and can be configured for mounting to different stabilizing platforms from bipods and tripods to vehicles, aircraft, boats and fortifications, usually as an infantry support weapon or squad automatic weapon.

== History ==
=== World War II ===
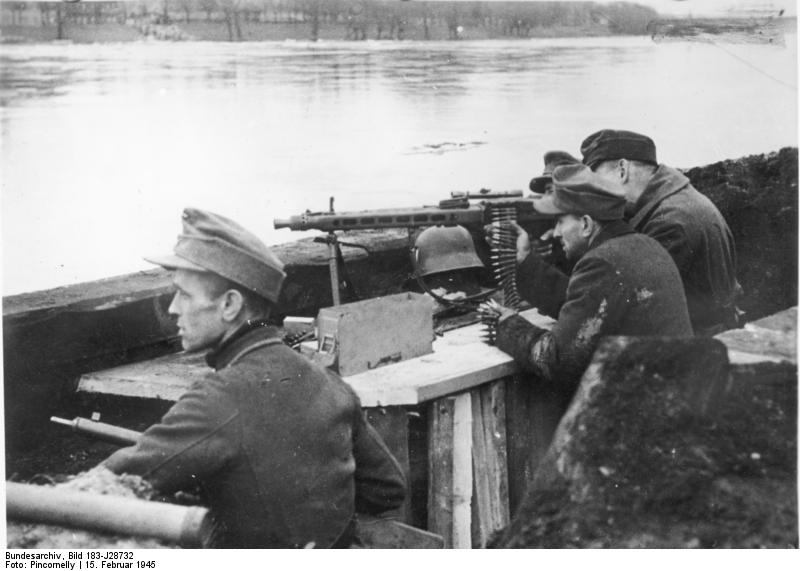
German Volksturm using a MG-42

An early GPMG was the MG 34, designed in 1934 by Heinrich Vollmer of Mauser on the commission of Nazi Germany to circumvent the restrictions on machine guns imposed by the Treaty of Versailles. It was introduced into the Wehrmacht as an entirely new concept in automatic firepower, dubbed the Einheitsmaschinengewehr, meaning "universal machine gun" in German. In itself the MG 34 was an excellent weapon for its time: an air-cooled, recoil-operated machine gun that could run through belts of 7.92×57mm Mauser ammunition at a rate of 850 rounds per minute, with lethality at ranges of more than 1,000 meters. The main feature of the MG 34 is that simply by changing its mount, sights and feed mechanism, the operator could radically transform its function: on its standard bipod, it was a light machine gun ideal for infantry assaults; on a tripod it could serve as a sustained-fire medium machine gun; mounting on aircraft or vehicles turned it into an air defence weapon, and it also served as the coaxial machine gun on numerous German tanks. During World War II, the MG 34 was supplemented by a new GPMG, the MG 42, although it remained in combat use. The MG 42 was more efficient and cheaper to manufacture, and more robust, as well as having an extremely high cyclic rate of fire of 1,200 to 1,500 rounds per minute. One of the Einheitsmaschinengewehr GPMG roles was to provide low level anti-aircraft coverage. A high cyclic rate of fire is advantageous for use against targets typically exposed to fire for a limited time span, like aircraft or targets minimizing their exposure by quickly moving from cover to cover

=== Prominent history after World War II ===
One of the first GPMGs to enter Global trade after the Second World War was the Belgian FN MAG which was a GPMG built to replace the Vickers Heavy Machine Gun and Bren Light Machine Gun. it was made by Ernest Vervier at the Fabrique Nationale (FN) at Herstal in Belgium in the early 1950s, it is chambered in 7.62x51mm and is an air-cooled belt-fed machine gun which took a lot of inspiration from the German MG-42, it is renowned for being a great example of GPMG design being used all over the world and has helped win many conflicts

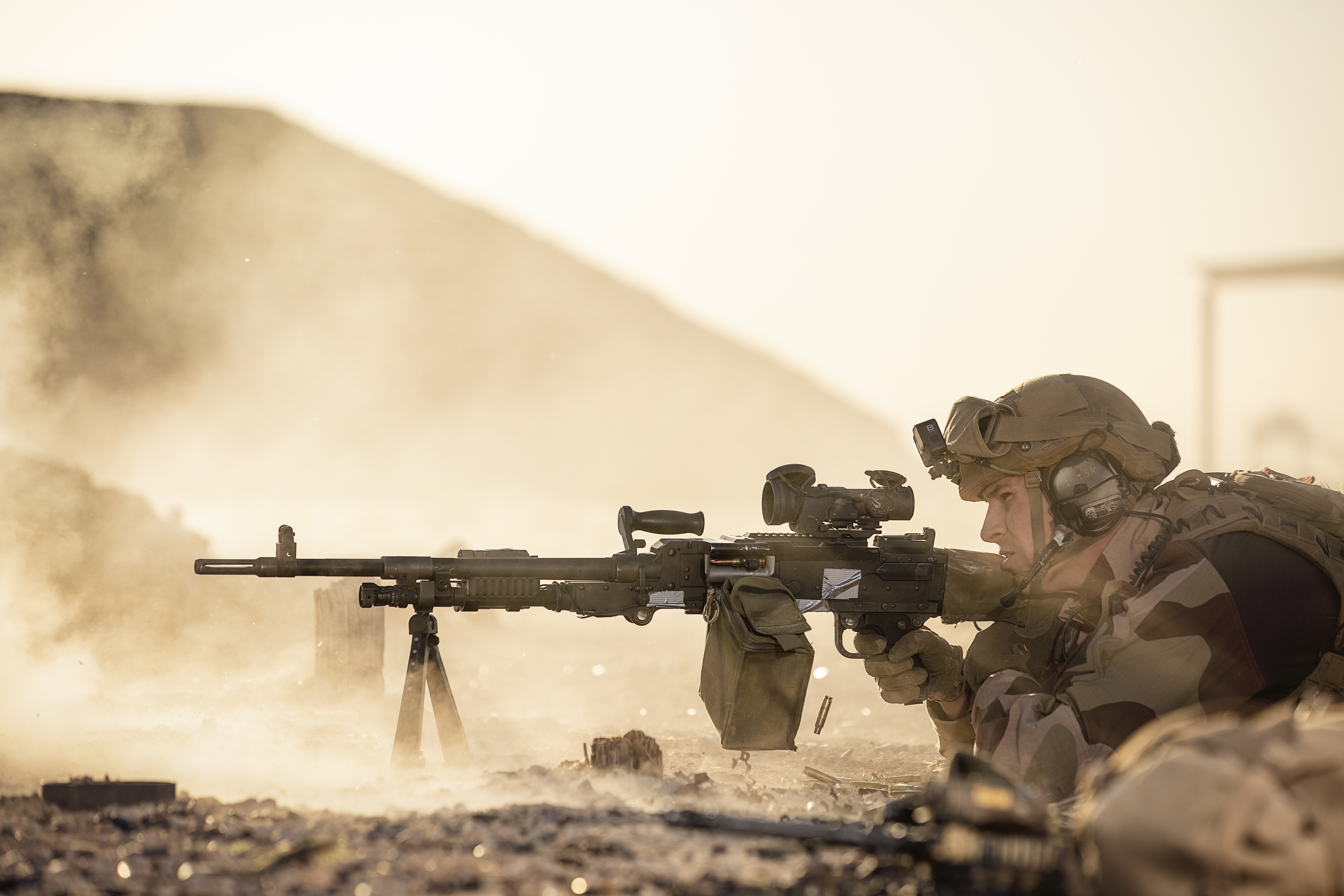
A Norwegian Soldier firing the FN MAG during a live fire exercise in May 27th 2020

=== Uses in conflicts and wars ===
The FN MAG was and still is a very popular GPMG being used by many nations under different names, with examples like the American Armed Forces using it under the name of the M240 or the Canadian Armed Forces using it under the name of the C6. It was used in the following conflicts, Congo Crisis, Indonesia-Malaysia Confrontation, Rhodesian Bush War, South African Border War, Six Day War, Nigerian Civil War, Vietnam War, Yom Kippur War, Falkland War, Gulf War, War in Afghanistan, Iraq War, Syrian Civil War, Libyan Civil War and Russo-Ukrainian war.

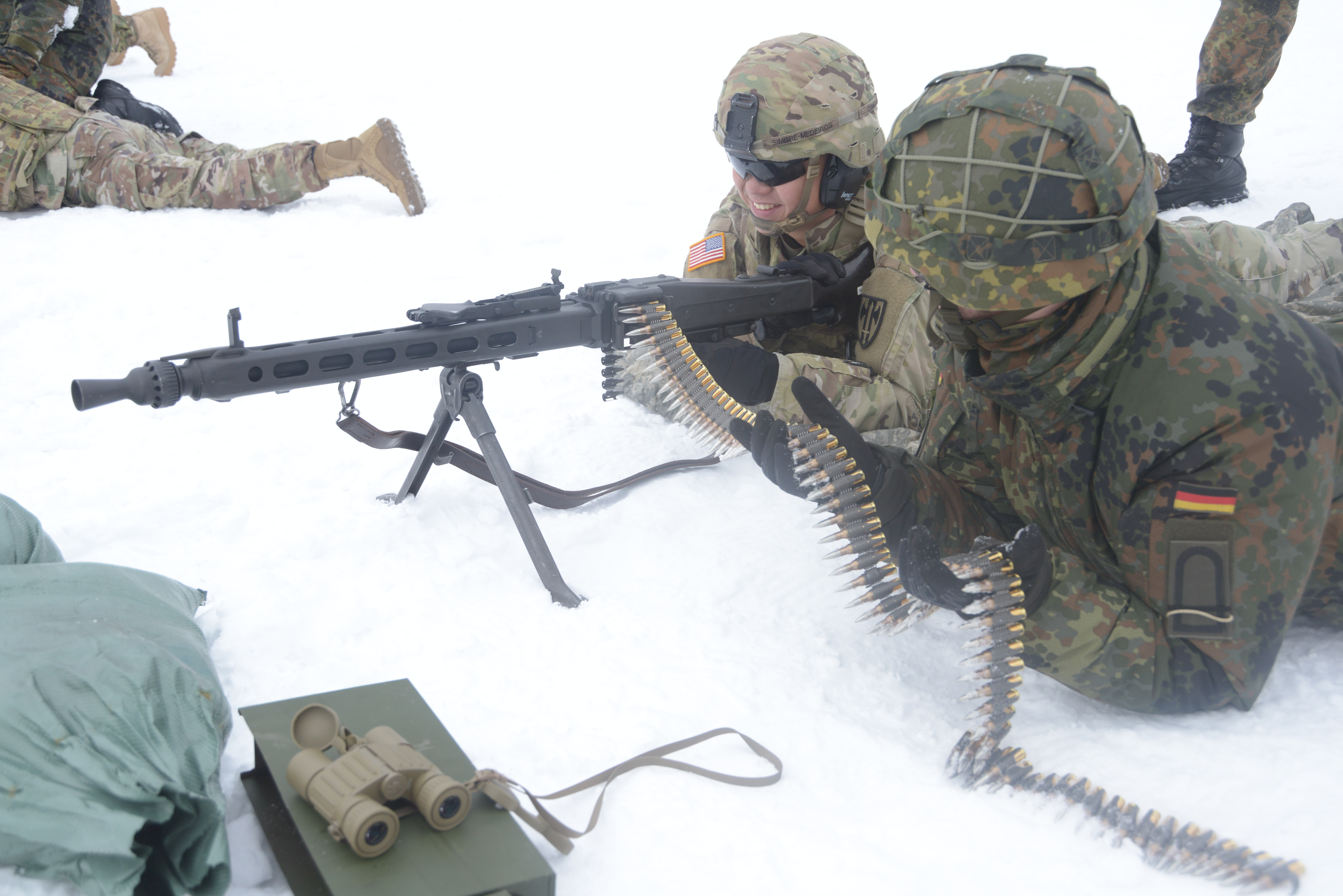
An image of German American Machine Gun Qualification training

Following the Second World War, the victorious Allied nations took an interest in the MG 34 and MG 42, influencing many post-war general-purpose machine guns, many still in use today. They lent design elements to the Belgian FN MAG and the American M60, while spawning the Zastava M53, Swiss M51, and Austrian MG 74. The MG 42's qualities of firepower and usability meant that it became the foundation of an entire series of postwar machine guns, including the MG 1 and MG 3; the latter, as of 2026, is still in production and is used by many nations most prominently the German Bundeswehr.

== Post-WWII examples ==
- German Rheinmetall MG 3, a direct descendant of the MG 42, still in service with the German Army and others, it is also widely exported.
- German Heckler & Koch HK21, is based on the Heckler & Koch G3 rifle and is widely exported.
- German Heckler & Koch MG5, the new (2015) standard machine gun of the German Army.
- Belgian FN MAG, which copied the MG 42's feed-system and trigger-mechanism. It is the most widely used GPMG among western armies with the American M240 machine gun being a great example of common FN MAG variants.
- Belgian/American Mk 48/Minimi 7.62, is a GPMG based on the FN Minimi light machine gun and M249 SAW.
- American M60, which is based on the German FG 42, it uses the MG 42's feed system and stamp-steel construction.
- Russian PK/PKM, family of multi-purpose machine guns, is based on the AKM assault rifle featuring stamped receivers and is widely exported.
- Chinese Type 67, and later improved models.
- Chinese Type 88 Machine Gun
- Chinese QJY-201
- South Korean S&T Motiv K16, is based on the K3 light machine gun.
- Swiss SIG MG 710-3
- Swiss SIG MG 50
- Israeli Negev NG7, is a GPMG based on the IWI Negev light machine gun.
- Belgian FN EVOLYS, is a multi-caliber, 3D printing and polymers material lightweight machine gun.

== Gallery ==
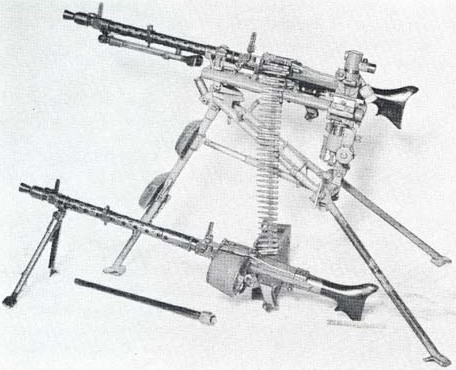
MG 34 belt-fed tripod version (top) and saddle-drum magazine bipod version (below)

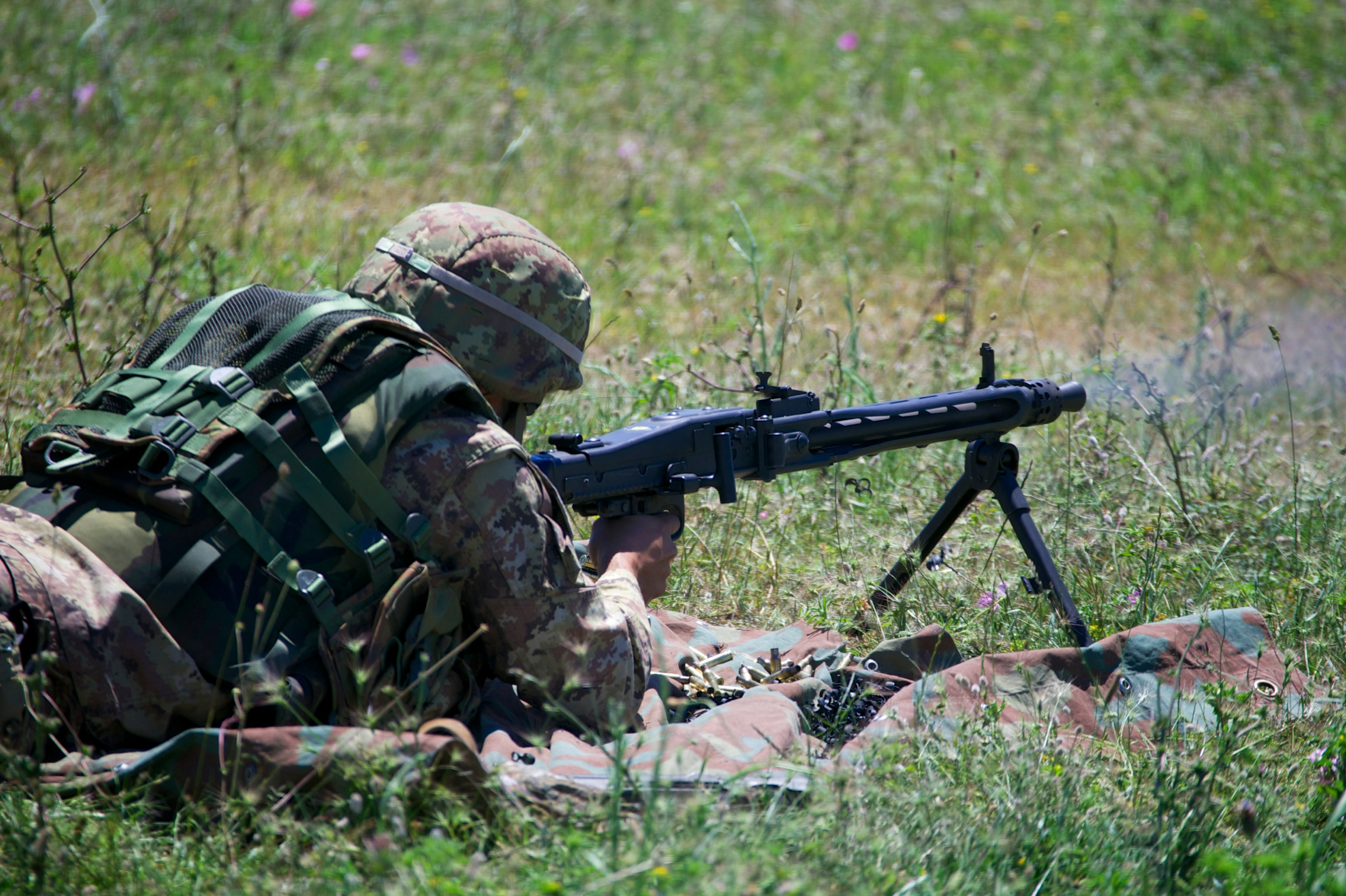
MG 42/59

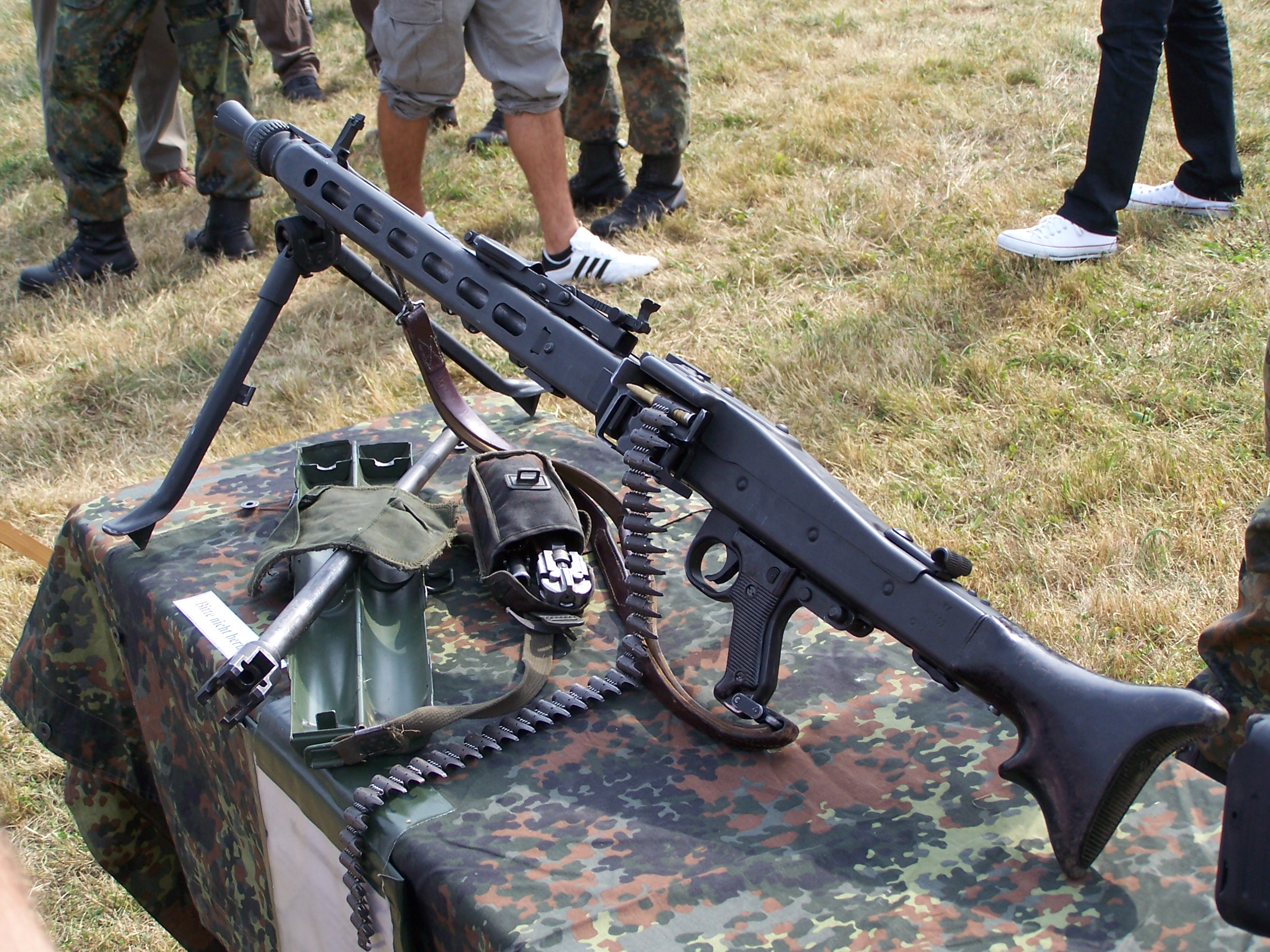
MG3

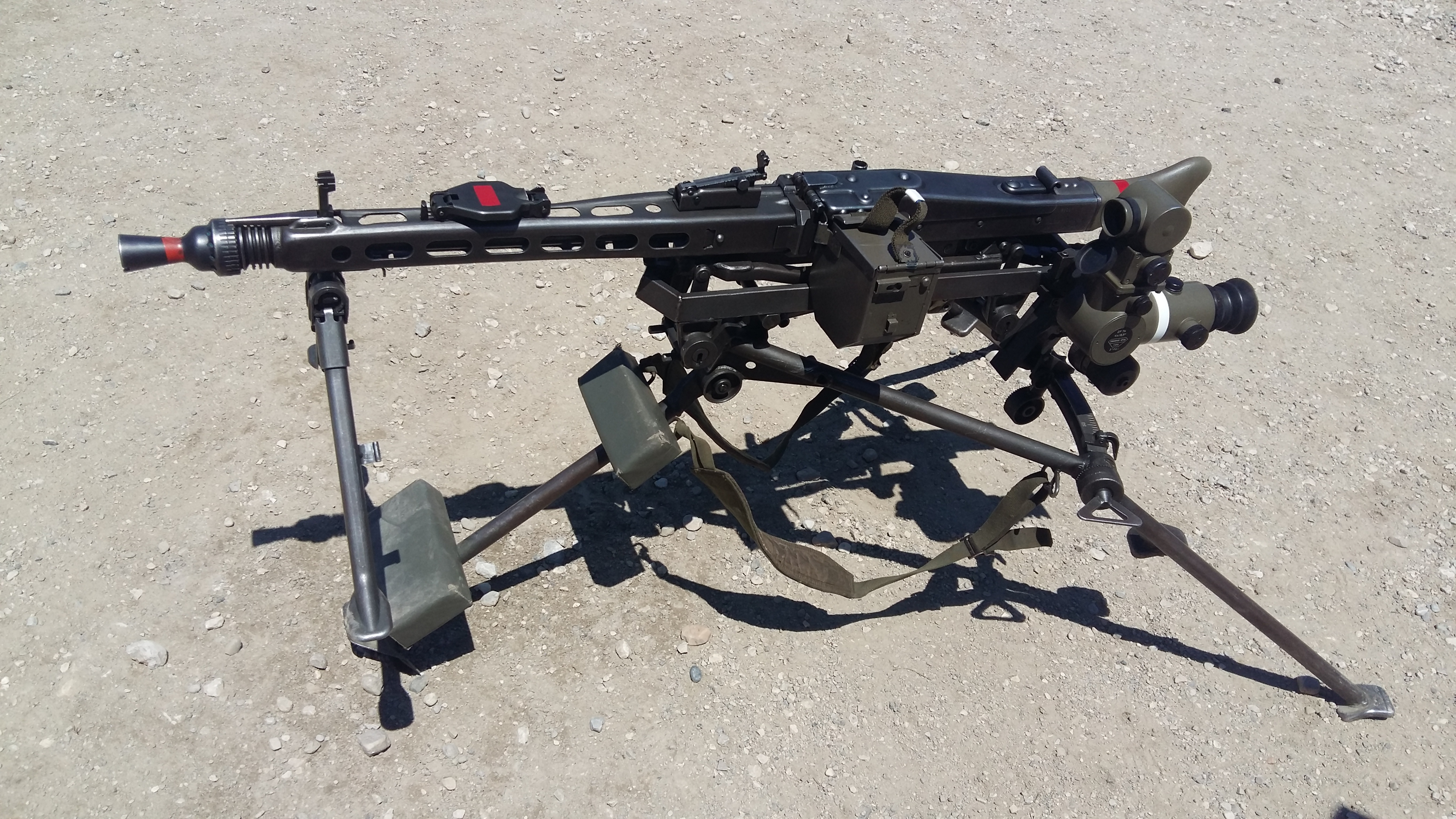
MG 74 mounted on its tripod

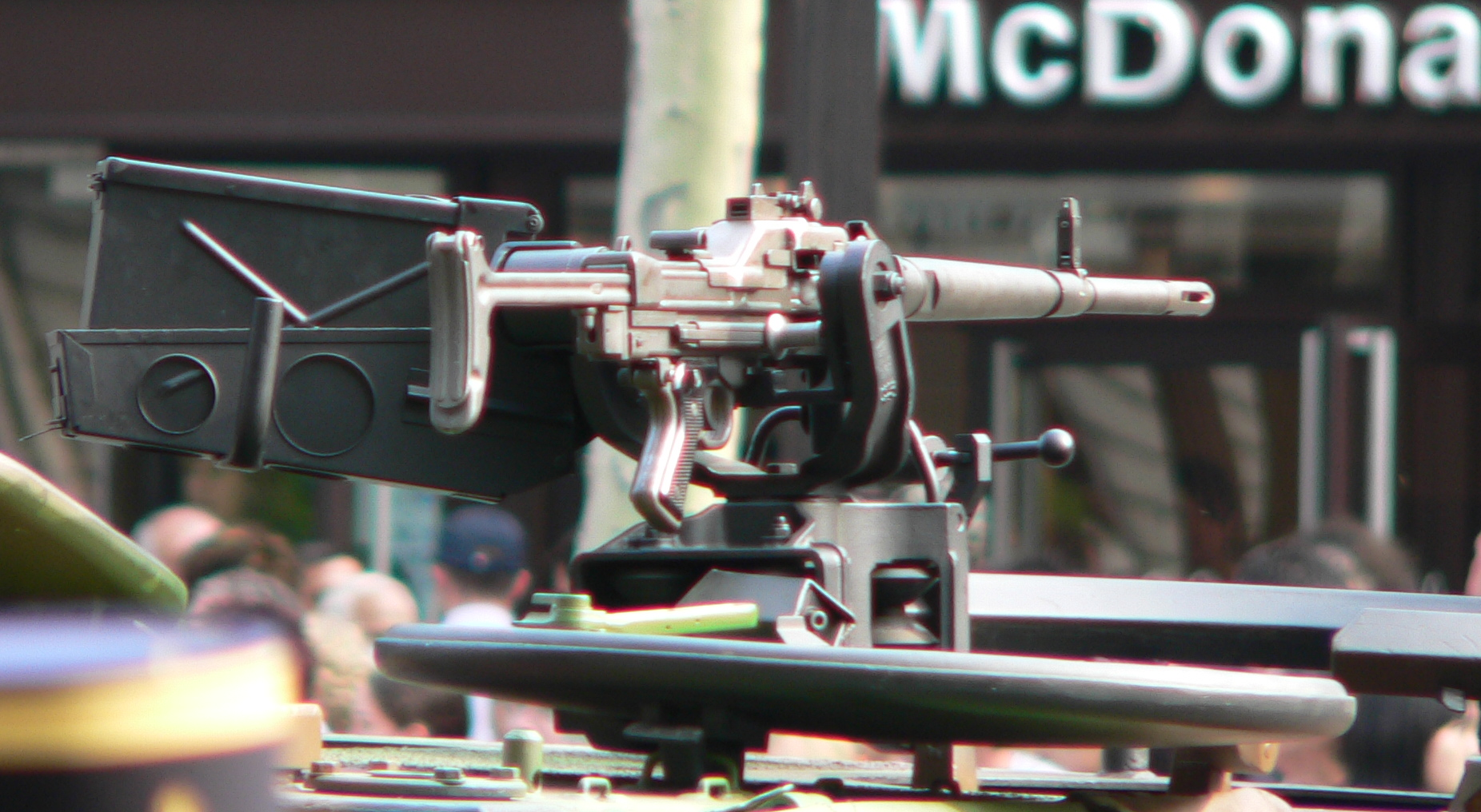
AA-52

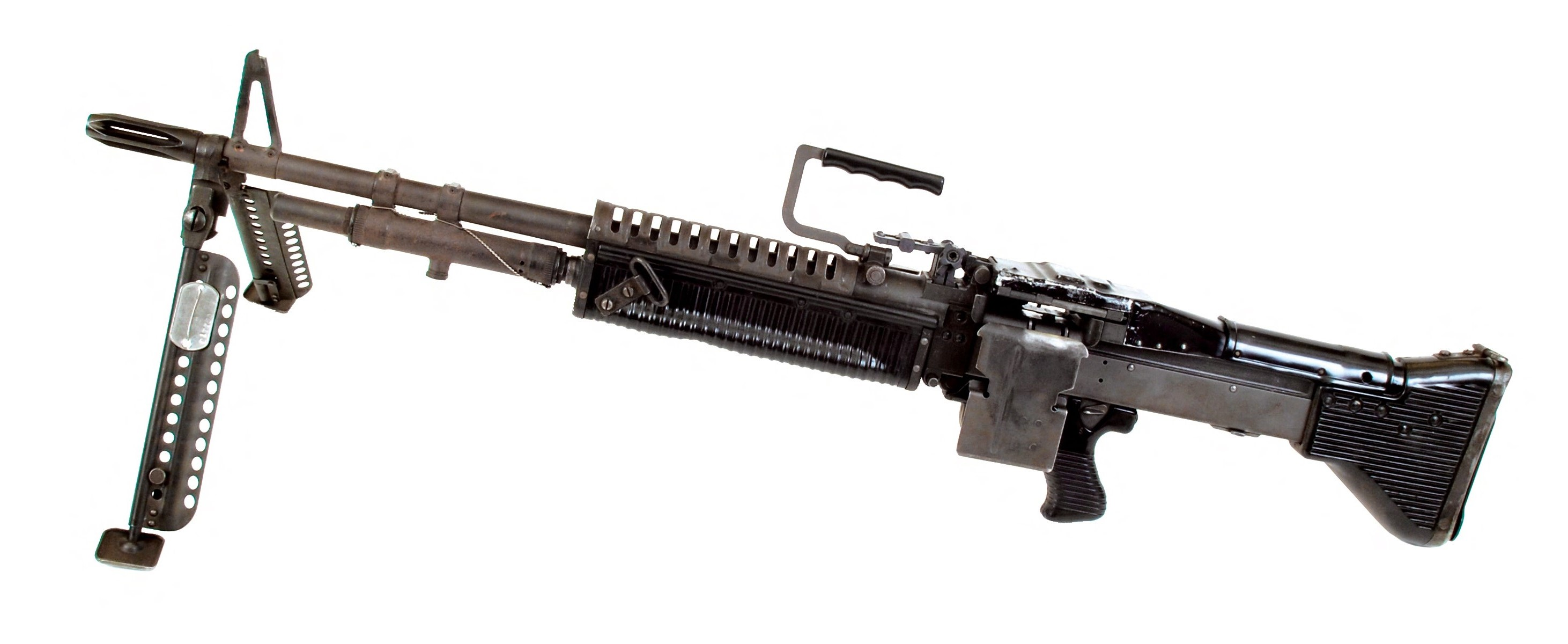
M60

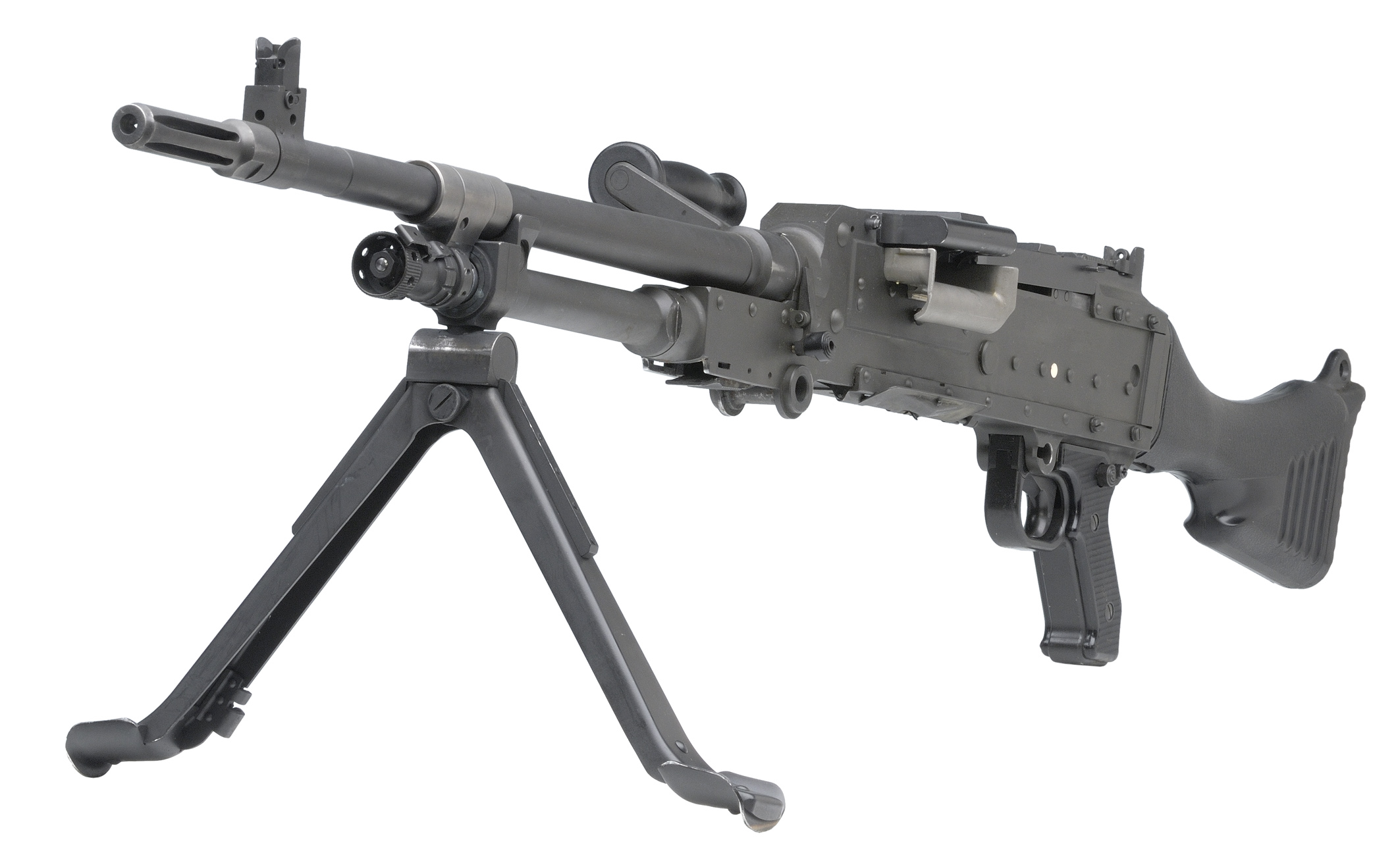
FN MAG (Fabrique Nationale de Herstal)

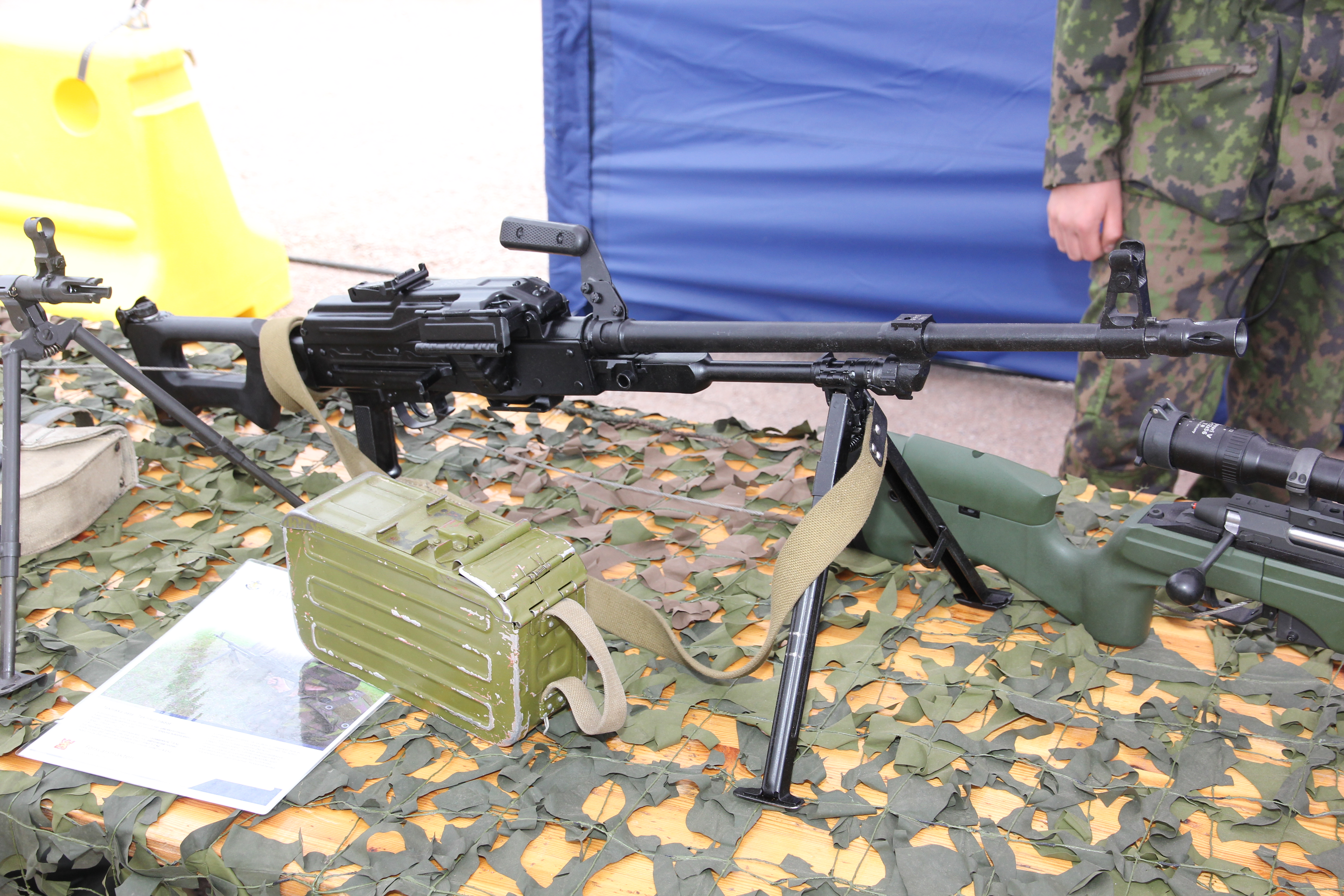
PKM

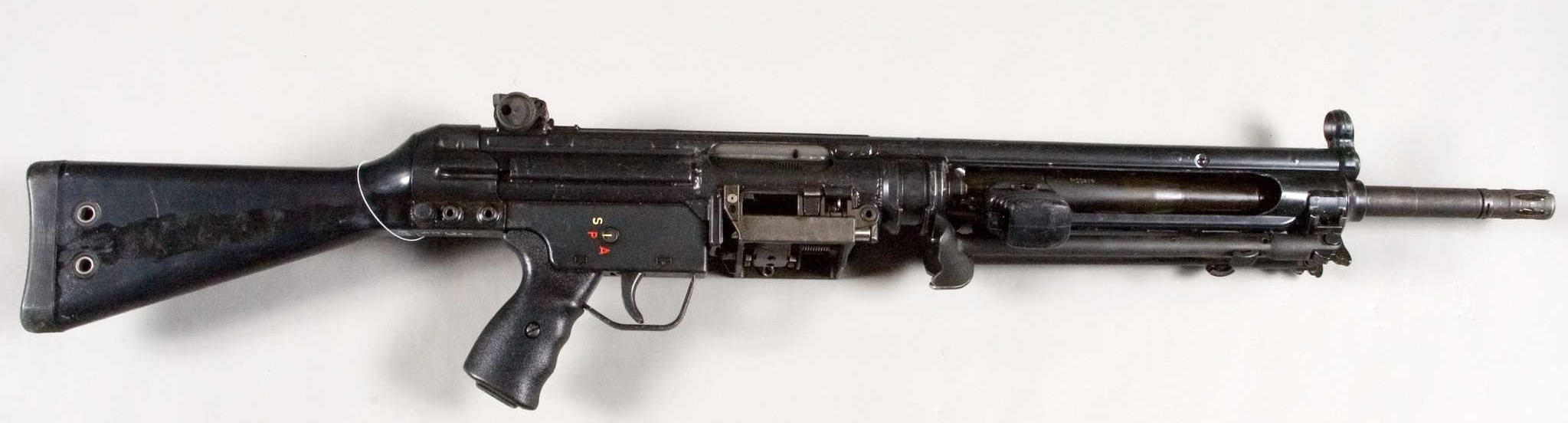
HK21A1

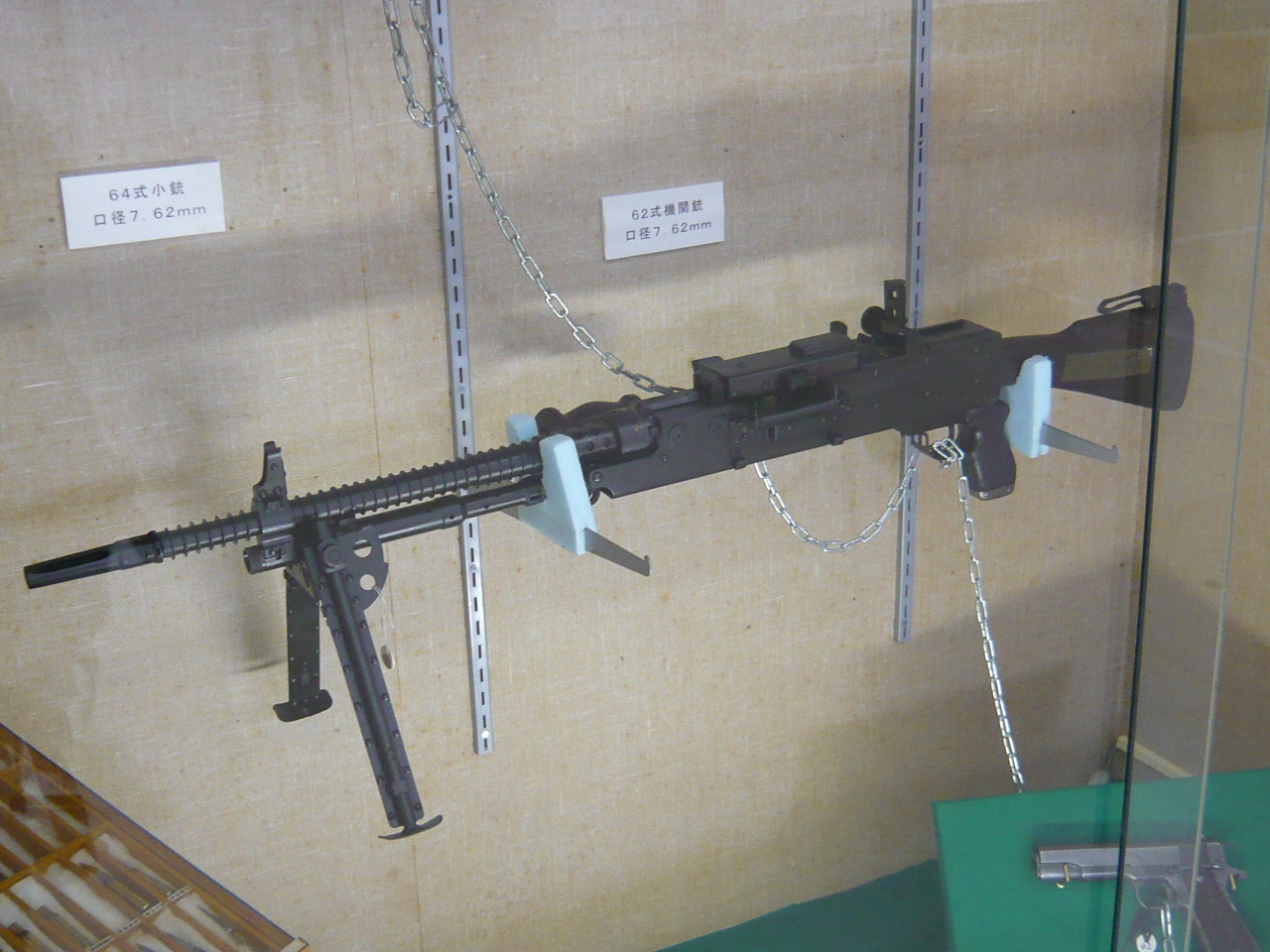
Type 62

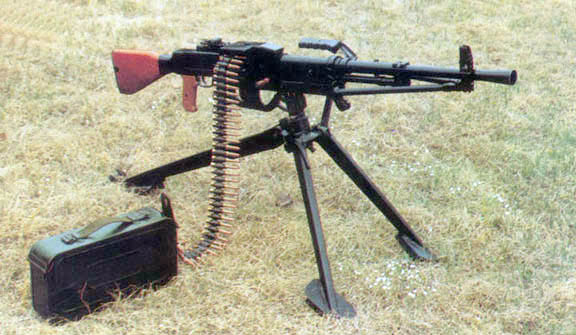
Type 67 on a tripod field mount

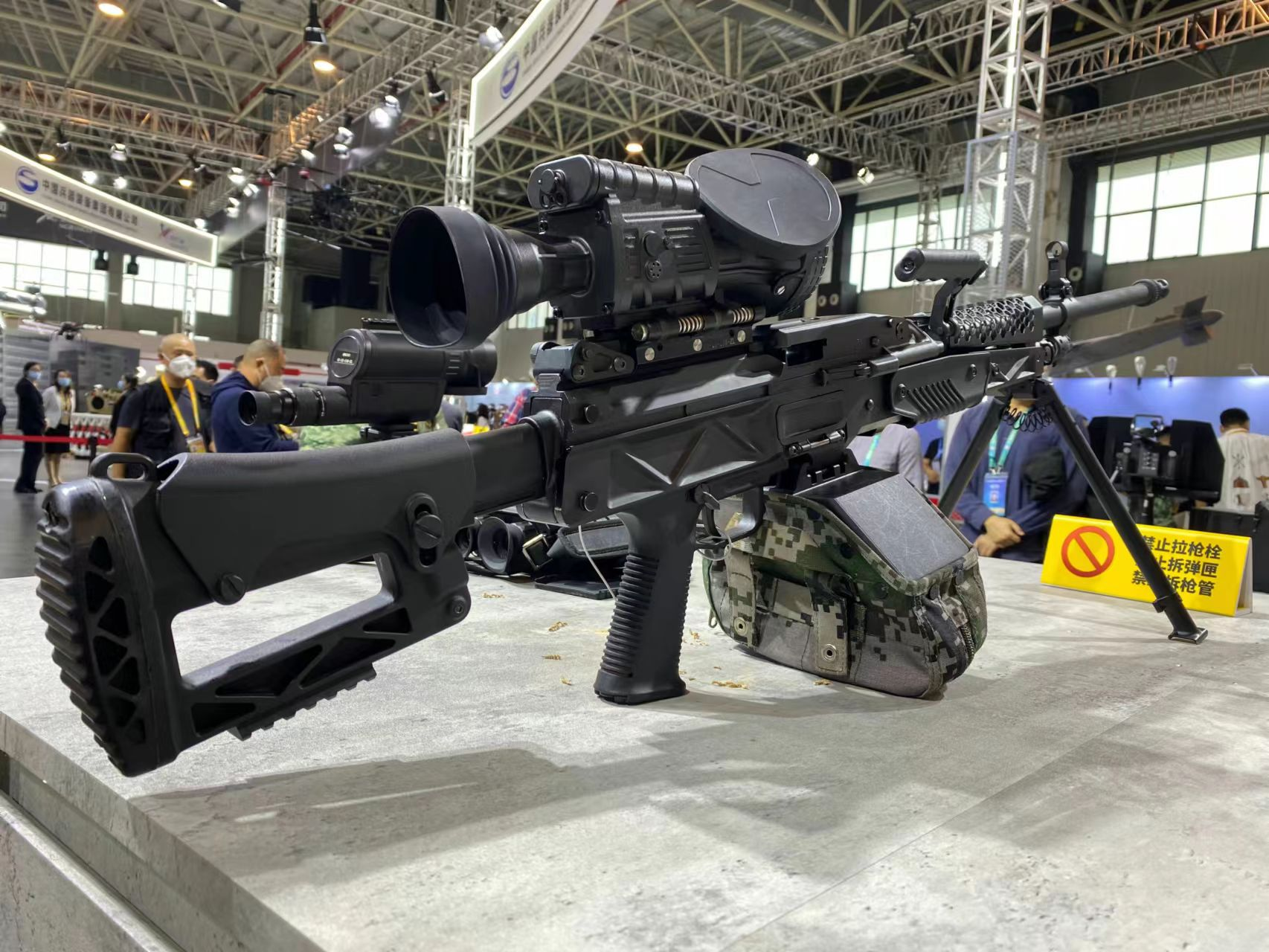
QJY-201 at Airshow China 2022

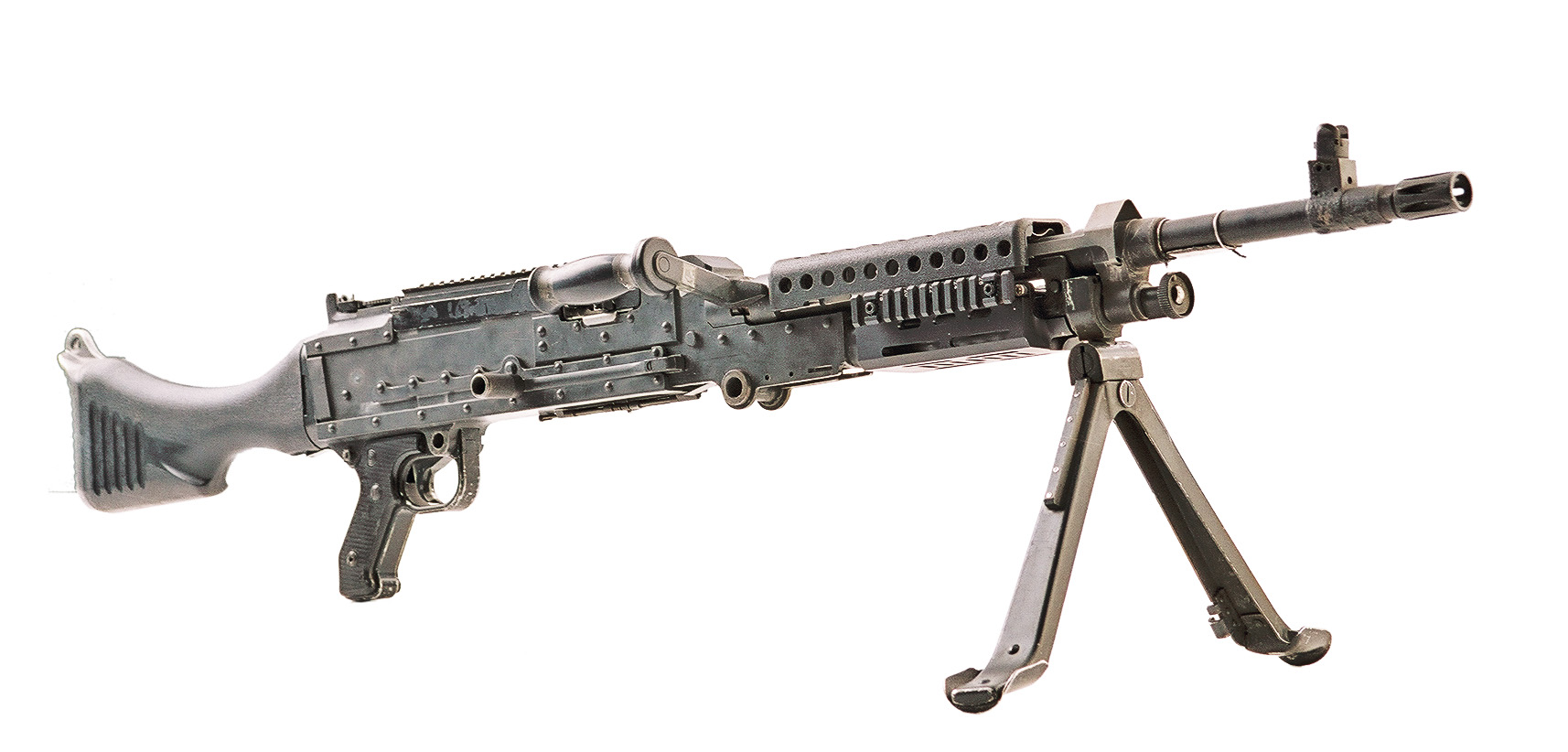
M240

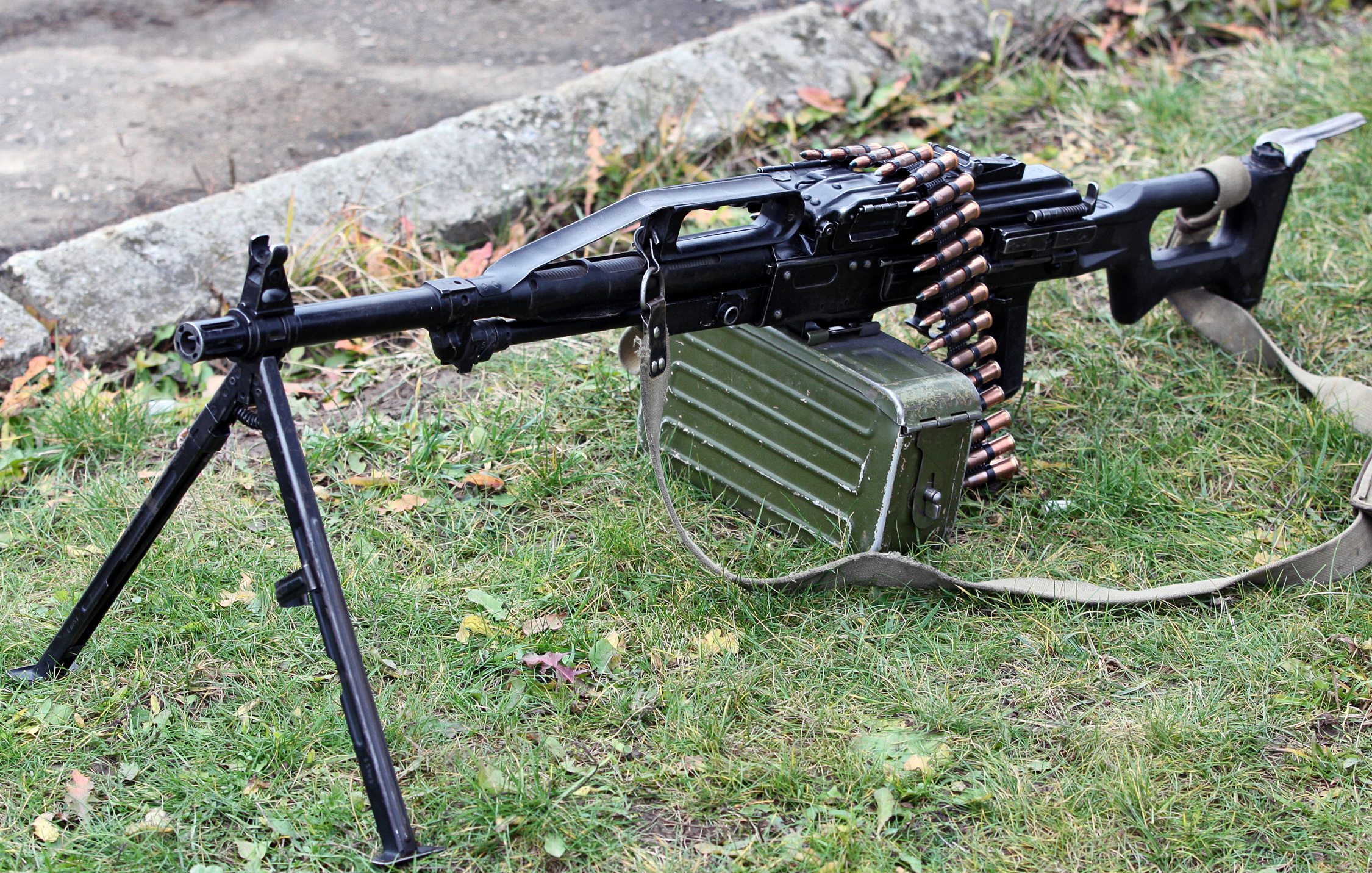
Pecheneg

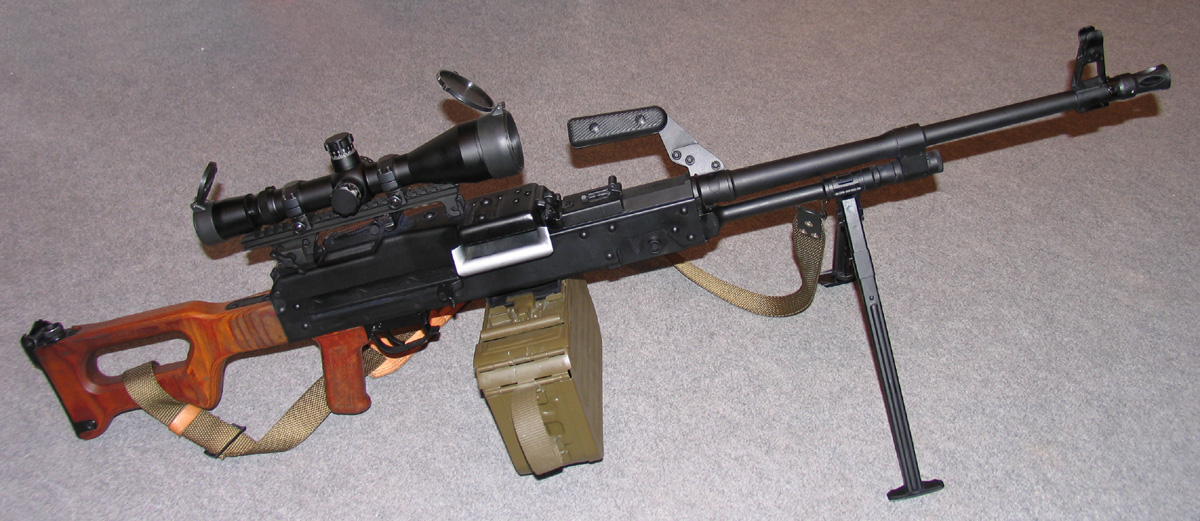
UKM-2000P

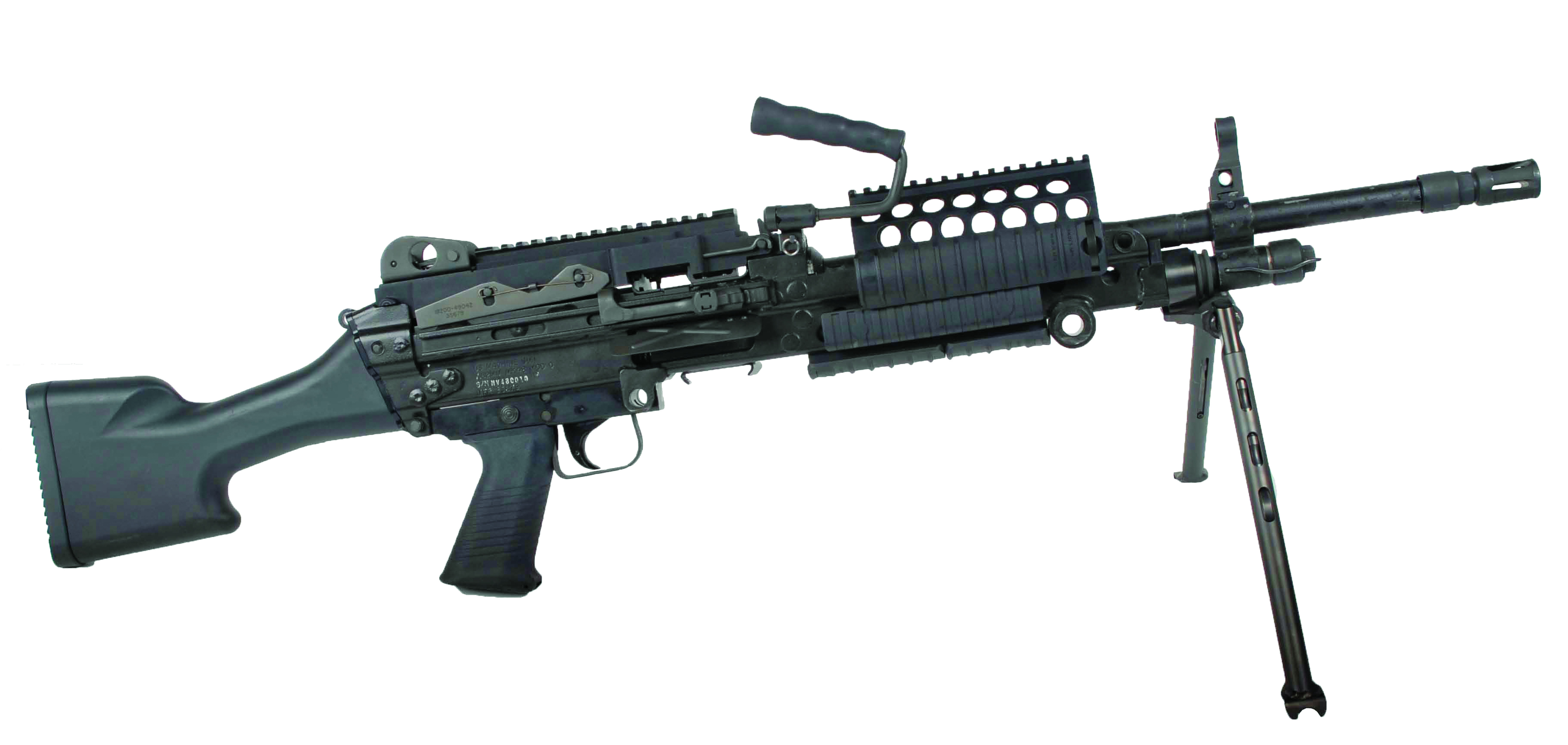
MK48 MOD 0/1, 7.62mm Lightweight Machine Gun

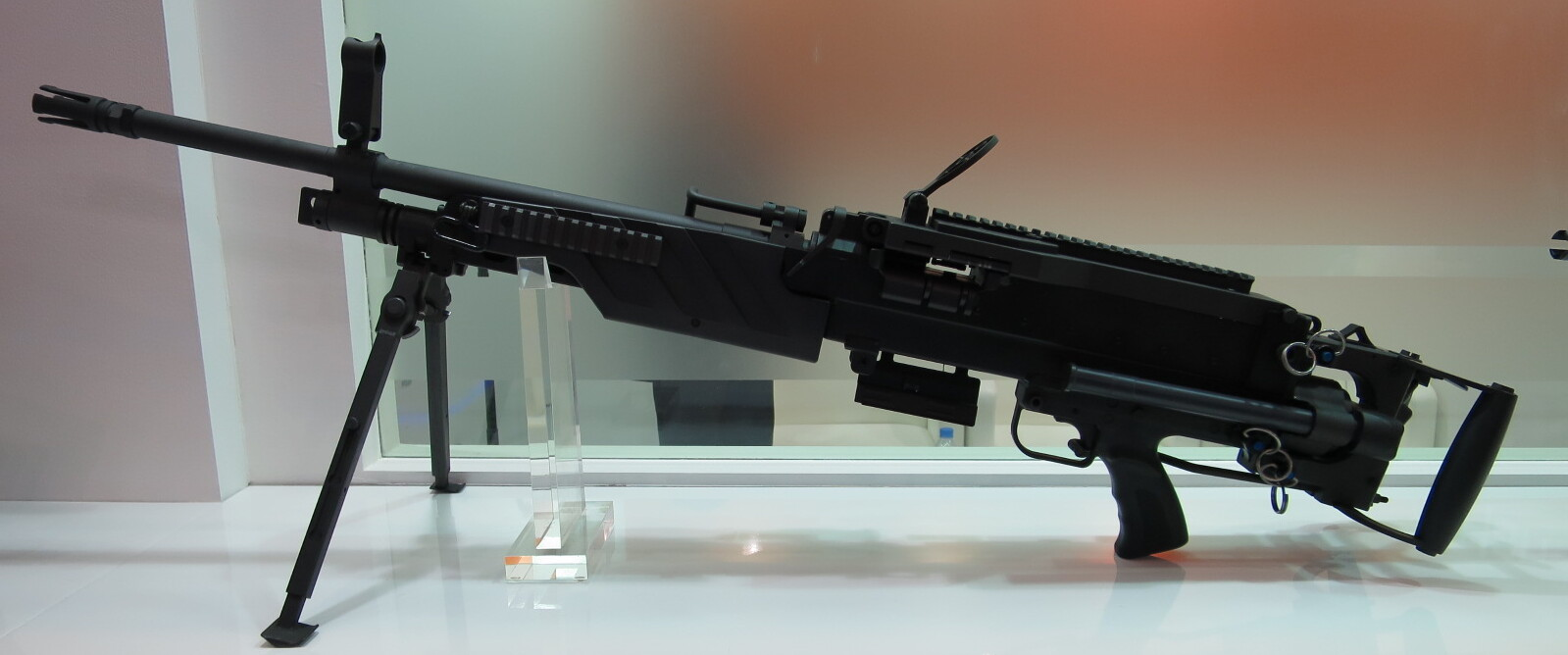
K16

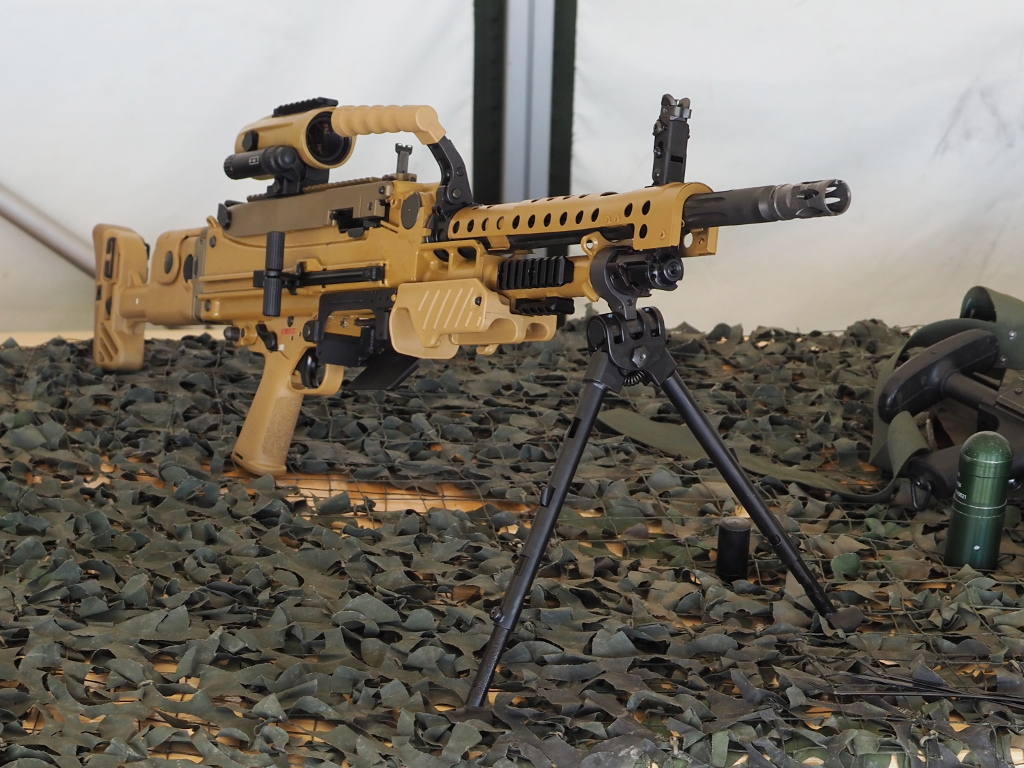
MG5

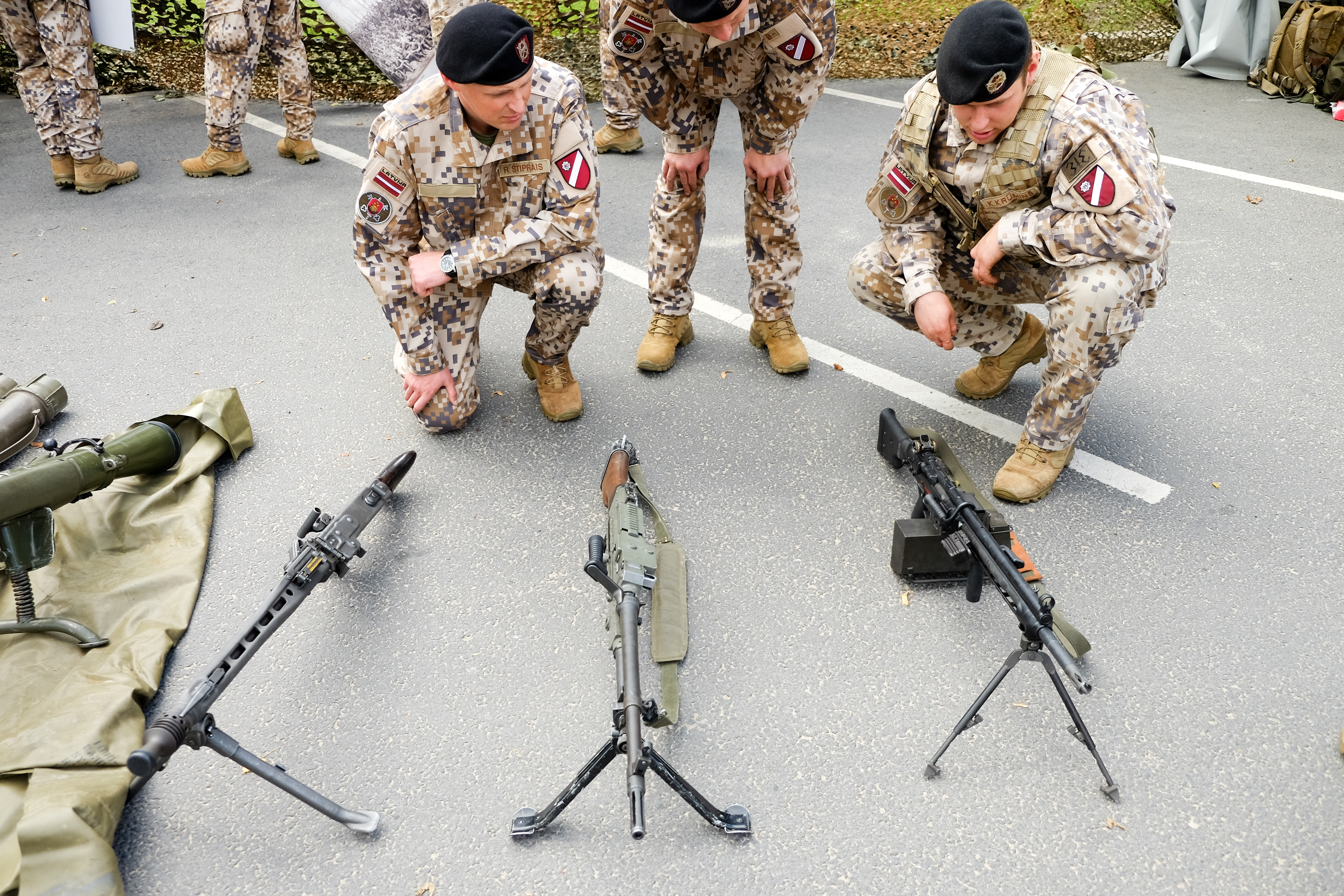
Latvian soldiers with MG3, FN MAG and HK21 machine guns

== See also ==
- Light machine gun
- Heavy machine gun
- Squad automatic weapon
- List of firearms
- Fully powered cartridge
