= QJY-88 =

QJY-88 machine gun
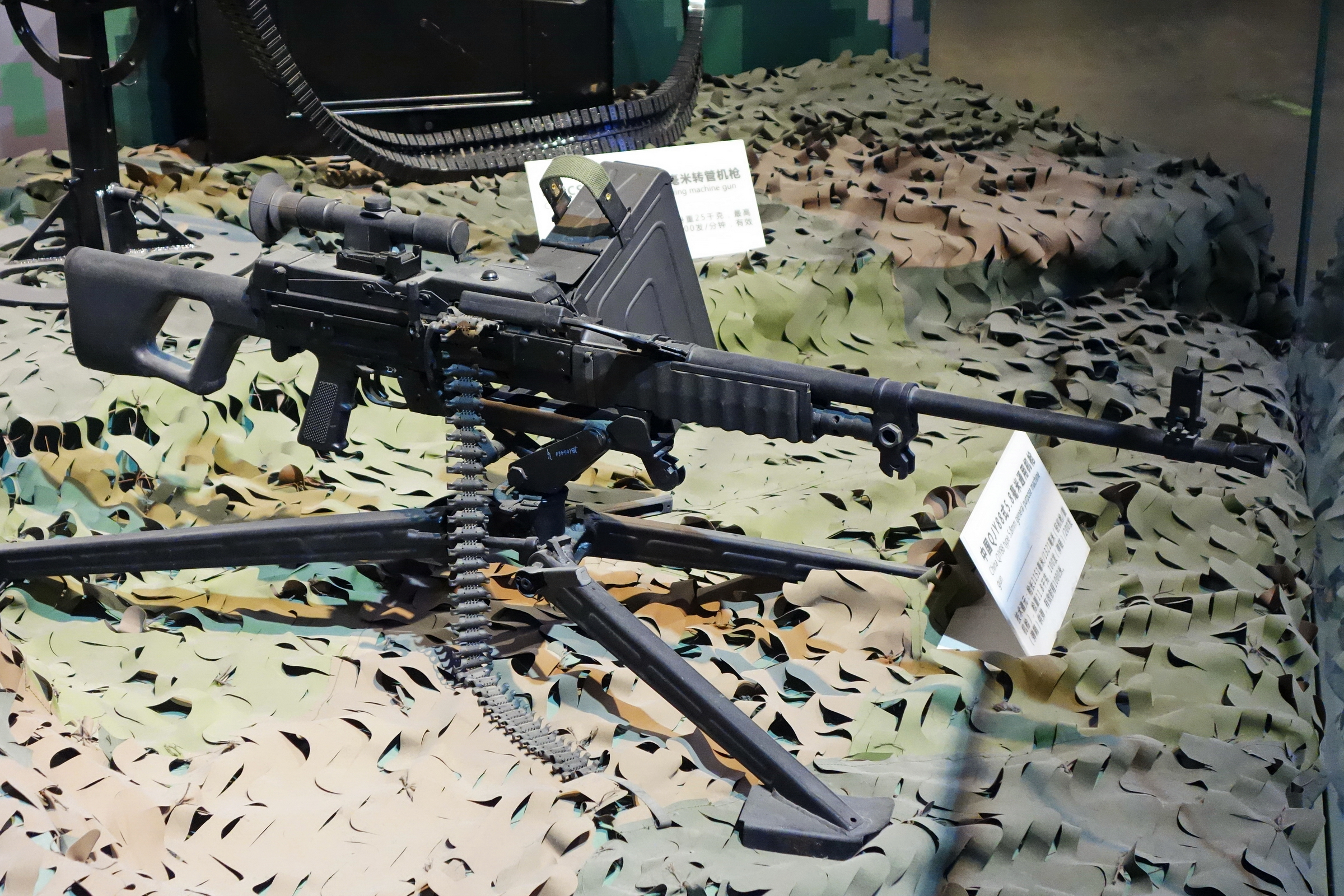
- QYJ-88 mounted on a tripod
- Type: Light machine gun
- Place of origin: People's Republic of China

Service history
- In service: Late 1990s
- Used by: See Users

Production history
- Designer: China North Industries Corporation
- Designed: 1989
- Manufacturer: China North Industries Corporation
- Variants: Light mode/Heavy mode

Specifications
- Mass: Light mode:7.6 kg (17 lb), Heavy mode:11.8 kg (26 lb)
- Length: Light mode:1,151 mm (45.3 in), Heavy mode:1,321 mm (52.0 in)
- Barrel length: 600 mm (24 in)
- Crew: 2: gunner and ammunition feeder
- Cartridge: 5.8×42mm DBP87 "Heavy rounds"
- Action: gas-operated
- Rate of fire: 650–700 rounds/min, 300 rounds/min (sustained fire)
- Muzzle velocity: 895 m/s (2,940 ft/s)
- Effective firing range: 800–1,000 m (2,600–3,300 ft)
- Feed system: Belt, 100 & 200 round cartridge case
- Sights: Iron sight

The QJY-88, also known as the Type 88 LMG (Chinese: 88式通用机枪; pinyin: 1988 shì tōngyòng jīqiāng; lit. '1988 model general purpose machine gun'), is a 5.8x42mm Chinese light machine gun designed in the late 1980s by China North Industries Corporation, otherwise known as Norinco.

== History ==
The QJY-88 was intended to replace the obsolete Type 67 machine gun in service with the PLA.

== Design ==
The GPMG was created with first prototypes designed in 1989 before it was approved for production in 1999. A variant with a heavier barrel, longer flash hider, and an electric solenoid trigger that replaces the buttstock, named QJT88 (QJT5.8), is designed for vehicle coaxial usage.

== Variants ==
QJY-88
Base variant.

QJT-88
Coaxial machine gun with electric solenoid trigger

== Users ==
- China
  - People's Liberation Army
    - Claimed to be replaced by QJY-201
  - Law enforcement in China

=== Non-state actors ===
- Tamil Tigers

== See also ==
- QJS-161 – (China)
- QBB-95 – (China)
- HK MG4 – (Germany)
- HK MG5 – (Germany)
- IMI Negev – (Israel)
- RPL-20 – (Russia)
- Daewoo Precision Industries K3 – (South Korea)
- Ultimax 100 – (Singapore)
- FN MAG – (Belgium)
- FN Minimi – (Belgium)
- FN EVOLYS – (Belgium)
- M60 machine gun – (United States)
- M249 light machine gun – (Belgium, United States)
- PK machine gun – (Soviet Union)
- PKP Pecheneg machine gun – (Russia)
- Sumitomo Type 62 – (Japan)
