= QJB-201 =

QJS-161/QJB-201
- Type: Light machine gun
- Place of origin: China

Service history
- Used by: People's Liberation Army

Production history
- Manufacturer: Norinco

Specifications
- Mass: 4.4 kg (9.7 lb) (empty)
- Length: 900 mm (35.4 in) (stock unfolded)
- Barrel length: 505 mm (19.9 in) (QJB-201)
- Cartridge: 5.8×42mm DBP-191
- Action: Gas-operated short-stroke piston, rotating bolt, open bolt
- Rate of fire: 700-800 rounds/min
- Muzzle velocity: 930–960 m/s (3,051–3,150 ft/s)
- Effective firing range: 600–800 m (2,000–2,600 ft; 660–870 yd)
- Feed system: 30-round detachable box magazine; 75-round detachable QJB-95 drum magazine; 100- or 150-round belt magazine in container with disintegrating links
- Sights: QMK-204 (3x)

The QJB-201 Squad Machinegun (Chinese: 201式班用机枪; pinyin: Èr líng yāo shì Bānyòng Jīqiāng),, also known as the QJS-161 Paratrooper Machinegun (Chinese: 161式伞兵机枪; pinyin: Yāo liù yāo shì Sǎnbīng Jīqiāng), is a Chinese light machine gun designed and manufactured by Norinco for the People's Liberation Army Ground Force and Airborne Corps.

== Development ==
The QJB-201 and QJS-161 are designed to replace China's QBZ-95 series squad automatic weapon and QJY-88 light machine gun. The weapon was developed in 2016, initially known as the paratrooper machine gun or QJS-161. In 2020, the weapon was certified with the designation QJB-201.

== Design ==
The QJS-161 features two types of barrel varied in length, presumably for different requirements from the PLA Ground Force and the PLAAF Airborne Corps. As an open-bolt machine gun, the QJB-201 uses 5.8×42mm ammunition that can feed either from a disintegrating belt in fabric container loaded into the feed port on the left side of the weapon, or a standard Chinese 5.8×42mm box magazine inserted vertically into the magazine well at the bottom of the weapon. A non-reciprocating charging handle is located on its right. A picatinny rail is located behind the short feed tray cover above the feeding port.

The squad automatic machine gun features a weight-reduction design, such as lightweight material for the gun body and the fabric detachable box magazine, reducing the empty weight to 4.4 kg (9.7 lb). The side-folding stock features a fully adjustable buttpad and cheek rest. The barrel change requires the opening of the feed tray cover, which is an error-proofing feature ensuring ammunition is removed before barrel replacement process.

== Variants ==
QJS-161
Paratrooper version. Initial version.
QJB-201
Regular version. Developed from the QJS-161
CS/LM20
Export designation for the QJB-201 in 5.8×42mm
CS/LM21
Export designation for the QJB-201 in 5.56×45mm NATO

== Users ==
- China: People's Liberation Army

== See also ==
- List of machine guns
- List of dual-feed firearms
- QJY-201 – (China)
- QJB-95
- QJY-88 – (China)
- FN EVOLYS – (Belgium)
- Heckler & Koch MG4 – (Germany)
- IWI Negev – (Israel)
- M249 light machine gun – (Belgium, United States)
- RPL-20 – (Russia)
