= QJY-201 =

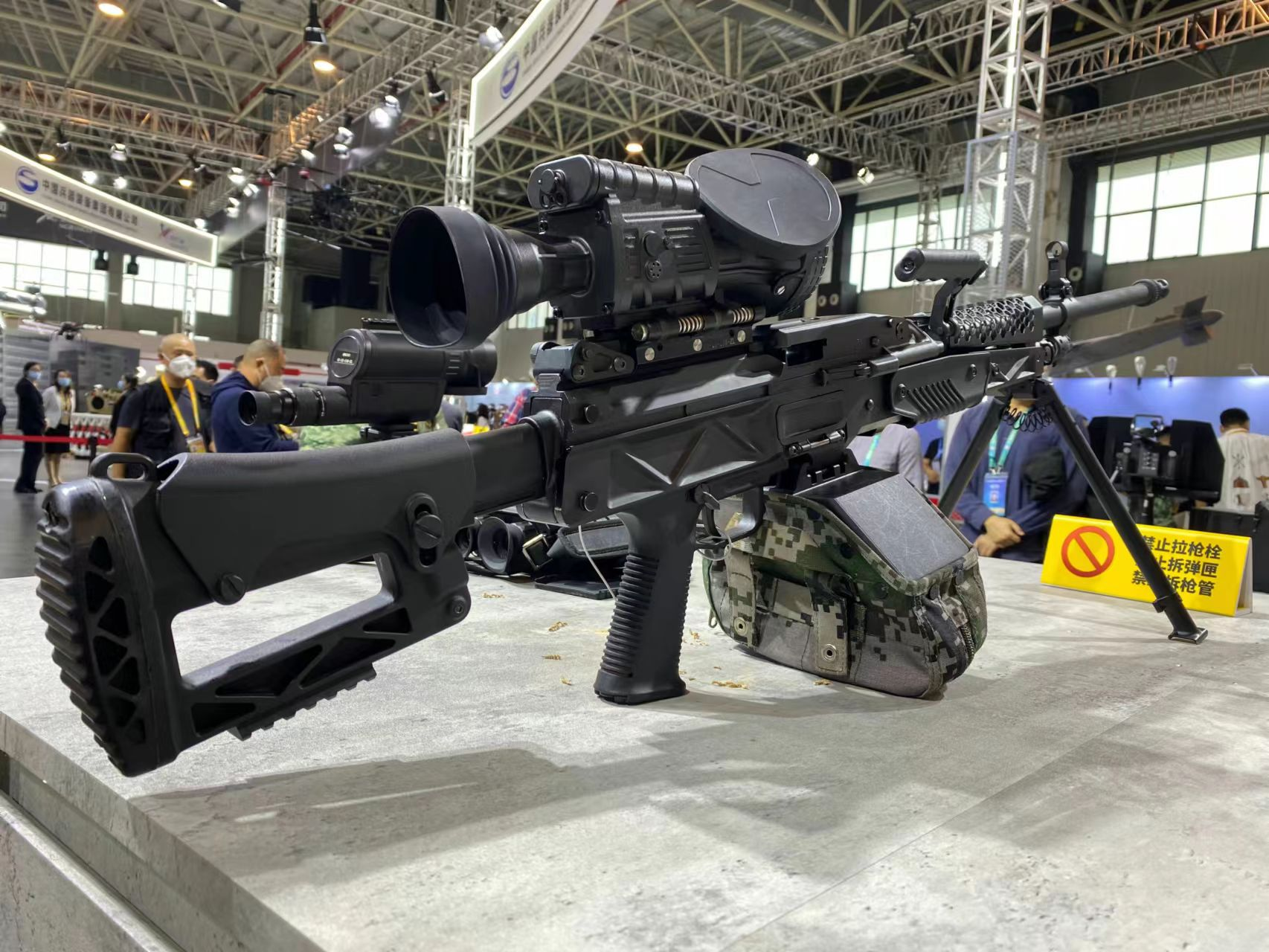
- QJY-201 displayed at Airshow China 2022
- Type: General purpose machine gun
- Place of origin: China

Service history
- In service: 2020-present
- Used by: People's Liberation Army

Production history
- Designed: 2010s
- Manufacturer: Norinco

Specifications
- Mass: 8 kg (18 lb)
- Length: 1,170 mm (46 in)
- Barrel length: 600 mm (24 in)
- Cartridge: 7.62×51mm DJP201
- Action: hybrid short-recoil and long-stroke piston, open-bolt
- Rate of fire: 650–750 rounds/min
- Effective firing range: 800–1,500 m (2,600–4,900 ft; 870–1,640 yd)
- Maximum firing range: 3,700 m (12,100 ft; 4,000 yd)
- Feed system: 100- or 200-round belt in box container
- Sights: optical telescopic sights

The QJY-201 (Chinese: 201式通用机枪; pinyin: Èr líng yāo shì tōngyòng jīqiāng), is a Chinese general purpose machine gun designed and manufactured by Norinco for the People's Liberation Army. It is chambered in the DJP-201 7.62×51mm cartridge, and features an unusual open-bolt, hybrid long stroke, short recoil operation. The QJY-201 incorporates weight reduction features, such as lightweight material for the body and a detachable box magazine made of fabric, reducing its weight.

The QJY-201 was first publicly unveiled at Zhuhai Airshow in September 2021.

== Design ==
The QJY-201 employs a hybrid gas-operated short recoil system, where barrel and bolt mechanics move backward together to absorb recoil. The barrels are cushioned by two springs mounted on the trunnion assembly. The receiver is constructed with aluminum for weight reduction. The barrel supports quick change using the carrying handle. A birdcage-type muzzle device with toothed collar is fitted on the barrel, providing provision for suppressors.

== Variants ==
QJY-201
General purpose machine gun chambered in 7.62×51mm DJP201
CS/LM22
Export designation for the QJY-201 in 7.62×51mm.
Type 20E 8.6mm
General purpose machine gun chambered in 8.6×70mm, largely based on QJY-201.

== Users ==
- China: People's Liberation Army

== See also ==
- QJS-161 – (China)
- QJY-88 – (China)
- XM250 – (Germany, United States)
- Mk 48 machine gun – (Belgium)
- PKP Pecheneg machine gun – (Russia)
- Lightweight Medium Machine Gun – (United States)
- FN EVOLYS – (Belgium)
- HK MG5 – (Germany)
