= Heckler & Koch MG5 =

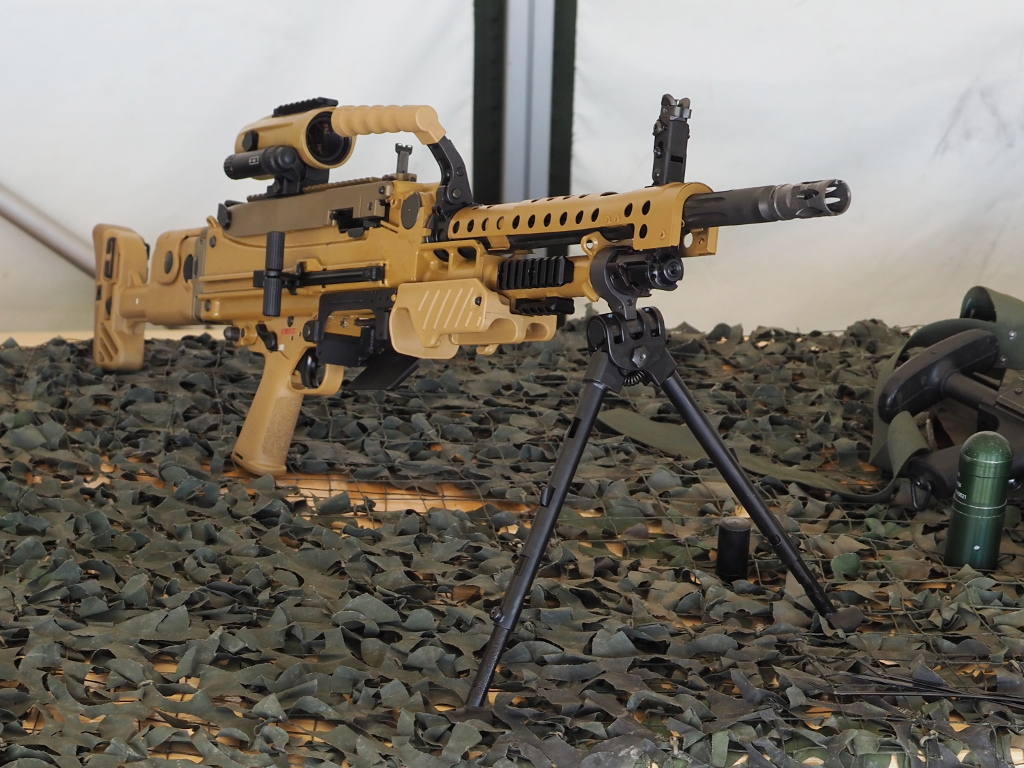
- Heckler & Koch MG5 general-purpose machine gun with Hensoldt ZO 4×30 Intermediate Range Targeting Optic of the Bundeswehr
- Type: General-purpose machine gun
- Place of origin: Germany

Service history
- In service: 2015–present
- Used by: See Users

Production history
- Designed: 2001–2018
- Manufacturer: Heckler & Koch
- Unit cost: 16,000 EUR
- Produced: 2010–present
- Variants: See Variants

Specifications
- Cartridge: 7.62×51mm NATO
- Caliber: 7.62 mm
- Action: Gas-operated, rotating bolt
- Rate of fire: 640/720/800 rounds/min
- Muzzle velocity: MG 5 A1: 840 m/s (2,756 ft/s); MG 5 & MG 5 S: 810 m/s (2,657 ft/s); MG 5 A2: 785 m/s (2,575 ft/s)
- Effective firing range: 100–1,000 m (109–1,094 yd) sight adjustments
- Maximum firing range: 600–1,000 m (656–1,094 yd) (bipod); 1,200–1,500 m (1,312–1,640 yd) (tripod mounted); 3,750 m (4,101 yd) (terminal)
- Feed system: Disintegrating DM60/M13 belt in 50-round Gurttrommel or 120-round in separate belt box or from stand-alone ammunition boxes
- Sights: Diopter sight or optical sights

The Heckler & Koch MG5 (in the development phase also known as the HK121) is a belt-fed 7.62×51mm NATO general-purpose machine gun manufactured by German firearm manufacturer Heckler & Koch. The MG5 resembles the 5.56×45mm NATO Heckler & Koch MG4 light machine gun. It was adopted into German military service in 2015.

== History ==
Work on the MG5 began, under the HK121 designation, shortly after the development of the MG4 light machine gun that Heckler & Koch initially presented as the HK MG43 at the MILIPOL 2001 trade show in Paris. A prototype of the HK121 was presented to a larger public by Heckler & Koch on the 14th day of the infantry in July 2010 in Hammelburg.

In June 2013, it was announced that Germany was testing and evaluating 65 samples and planned to buy at least 7,114 of the machine guns for the Bundeswehr during 2014–2017, in a deal that over time could grow to 12,733 MG5s.

The MG5 is designed to be modular, was intended to replace the MG 3 machine gun that had been in German service since 1959, and started doing so in 2015. According to the Bundeswehr, the MG5 is more accurate than the MG3. The effective range on bipod is therefore greater. The MG5 reduced cyclic rate uses less ammunition and the user can adjust the stock to individual ergonomic preferences. By 2022 the MG5 should replace the MG3 in Bundeswehr service.

For the development and use of a special bolt for training cartridges the German Federal Government has allocated a budget of 7.3 million Euro. The costs to integrate the MG5 in various tripod and weapon stations mountings in German use are estimated around 60 million Euro.

In 2024, Heckler & Koch introduced a lightweight derivative of the MG5 called HK421.

== Design details ==
=== Operating mechanism ===
The MG5 uses a long-stroke gas piston to cycle the conventional rotary bolt action. The design employs a number of concepts that have proven successful in other firearms. The locking mechanism, feed and trigger mechanisms are derived from the MG4 light machine gun. The MG5 fires from an open bolt.

=== Features ===
The MG5 is gas-operated and chambered in 7.62×51mm NATO. The weapon's operation is almost identical to that of the MG4 light machine gun. Unlike the stamped sheet metal receiver of MG4 light machine gun the receiver of the MG5 is made out of two steel receiver shell castings and a connection block that are connected by a patented process. The safety is ambidextrous, the butt stock is field adjustable for length of pull and features a user height adjustable cheek-piece and can be folded depending on the variant. It also features a visible and tactile loaded chamber indicator to alert its operator that there is a round present in line with the chamber. Three-position adjustment of the gas port allows selecting the cyclic rate of fire (640, 720 or 800 rounds per minute) and subsidiary can adjust the gas system for various types of cartridge loadings or use in the presence of heavy fouling. The gas port can be field adjusted by sliding the base of a 7.62×51mm NATO cartridge into machined slots to select one of the three possible settings. The MG5 features STANAG 4694 NATO Accessory Rails that are backwards-compatible with the STANAG 2324/MIL-STD-1913 Picatinny rails allowing installation of optical sights and other accessories.

=== Barrel ===
The quick-change cold hammered chrome-lined barrel is an integral part of the barrel assembly and has a heat shield and a carrying/barrel exchange handle, gas port and front sight attached. After around 300 rounds of rapid fire, the gun operator has to replace the hot barrel with a new cool(er) one. Non-observance of this technical limitation renders the barrel prematurely unusable. A hot barrel can be replaced with its carrying and barrel exchange handle without using protective gloves or other heat protection. The MG5 takes zero shifts between barrel assemblies into account by making the front sight of the assemblies mechanically adjustable.

=== Feeding ===
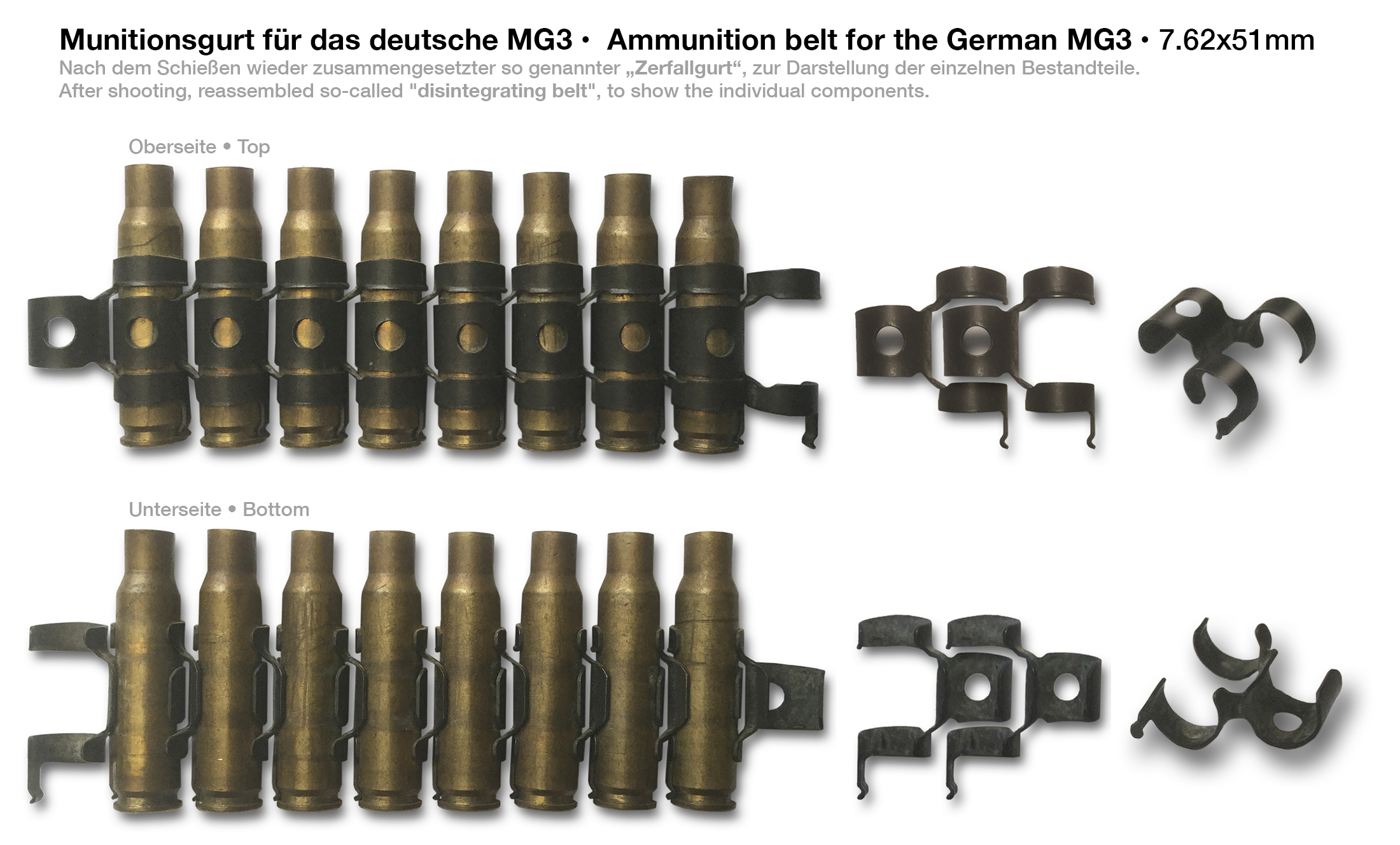
disintegrating metal M13 link belt (designated DM60 by Germany)

The MG5 uses M13 (designated DM60 by Germany) disintegrating belts for feeding ammunition from the left side. It can be fed with a Gurttrommel (belt drum) which contains a 50-round disintegrating belt and is fitted to the receiver on the left side. The Gurttrommel is not a true magazine but holds a curled 50-round belt preventing it from snagging, twisting and getting stuck during mobile assaults. Alternatively, the MG5 can be fed with 80-round cloth ammunition pouches or a Gurtkasten (belt box) containing 120 rounds and fitted to the left side of the receiver or from stand-alone ammunition boxes. The feeding system is based on the direct push-through of the cartridge out of the belt link into the gun's chamber. Feed is performed in two steps by a pawl-type feeding mechanism that continues to move the belt during both the rearward and forward cycles of the reciprocating bolt, producing a smooth belt flow. The ejection of empty M13 links is to the right side, and spent cartridge cases are ejected downwards through an ejection port located at the base of the receiver.

=== Sights ===
In its standard form, the MG5 is equipped with closed type iron sights with range settings on the receiver mounted compact rear sight element up to 1,000 m (1,094 yd) in 100 m (109 yd) increments. The folding self-illuminating front sight element is mounted on the barrel assembly and is adjustable mechanically for both windage and elevation. The sight line radius is 602 millimeters (23.7 in).
The MG5 was expressly designed to use various types of receiver mounted optical sights as its primary sighting option. Therefore achieving a negligible zero change in practical use between barrel assembly changes was a major design requirement that was not easily met. The originally agreed Bundeswehr zero change requirements were relaxed by the German government for which a corresponding price reduction was agreed upon. In single fire the mean point of impact may shift by a maximum of 3.44 MOA/10 mrad (previously 1.72 MOA/5 mrad) after a barrel change with a barrel of the same length. In burst fire the mean point of impact may shift by a maximum of 5.16 MOA/15 mrad (previously 3.44 MOA/10 mrad) after a barrel change with a barrel of the same length.
Optical or night sights or laser pointers can be mounted on a length of STANAG 4694 NATO Accessory Rail located on the receiver feed tray cover. Bundeswehr models are generally equipped with Hensoldt ZO 4×30 Intermediate Range Targeting Optic combined with a red dot as optical day sights with 4× magnification to promote accuracy of fire. The ZO 4×30 Intermediate Range Targeting Optic can be augmented by night-vision attachments.

=== Safety ===
With the ambidextrous lever-type safety placed in the safe setting, the firing mechanism is disabled regardless of the position of the bolt and the arm can be cocked by the non-reciprocal T-shaped cocking handle with the safety engaged. The MG5 can be loaded with the bolt forward or cocked as the cam roller is spring-loaded, pushing down when the feed cover is closed and then automatically snapping up to properly engage and operate the feed camming track. When a cartridge is in line with the feedway and the cover is closed, an indicator tab is pushed upward on the cover, providing visual as well as tactile warning in low light conditions.

=== Bipod and tripod ===
For the light machine gun role a quick-detachable user adjustable folding bipod weighing 0.70 kg (1.54 lb) is provided. Alternatively a "Grip Pod", a type of vertical grip that has a deployable bipod inside the handle, can be mounted to increase mobility.

In a stationary, heavy machine gun role the MG5 can also be mounted on the MG3 Feldlafette buffered field tripod by using additional adapters.

The Bundeswehr use a RAL 8000 green brown surface finish on their MG5s and has chosen to use a 550 mm (21.7 in) barrel instead of a 663 mm (26.1 in) barrel for their mounted guns to promote parts uniformity.

Various side-folding and fixed polymer buttstocks are available as well as a folding fore end forward grip positioned under the gas tube.

=== Use with turrets ===
- Valhalla Turrets with the Loki MG-5 Remote Weapon Station
- KNDS FLW 100
- KNDS FLW 200

== Variants ==
Variant	Overall length (Note: Overall length: Stock unfolded (Stock folded)) mm/in	Barrel length mm/in	Height mm/in	Width mm/in	Weight (Note: Weight: Weapon (Barrel assembly)) kg/lb
MG5 (Universal)	1,160 mm (45.7 in) (960 mm (37.8 in))	550 mm (21.7 in)	239 mm (9.4 in)	120 mm (4.7 in)	11.20 kg (24.7 lb) (3.00 kg (6.6 lb))
MG5 A2 (Infantry)	1,160 mm (45.7 in) (Note: Fixed stock)	460 mm (18.1 in)	285 mm (11.2 in)	120 mm (4.7 in)	9.90 kg (21.8 lb) (2.50 kg (5.5 lb))
MG5 A1 (Mounted)	1,055 mm (41.5 in)	663 mm (26.1 in)	195 mm (7.7 in)	120 mm (4.7 in)	10.00 kg (22.0 lb) (3.24 kg (7.1 lb))
MG5 S (Special Forces)	1,012 mm (39.8 in)	550 mm (21.7 in)	239 mm (9.4 in)	171 mm (6.7 in)	12.10 kg (26.7 lb) (3.00 kg (6.6 lb))

=== Derivatives ===
The HK421 is a 7.62×51mm NATO chambered reduced-weight machine gun, Heckler & Koch based on their more durable constructed MG5 general-purpose machine gun product line. Beside weight-reduction by using a stamped sheet metal receiver, the feeding, internal hydraulic buffer recoil mitigating, suppressor capability and ergonomic features were revised or added to better suit (specialized) infantry uses. The HK421 uses M13 disintegrating belts for feeding ammunition from the bottom side and ejects empty M13 links and spent cartridge cases to the right side.

== Users ==
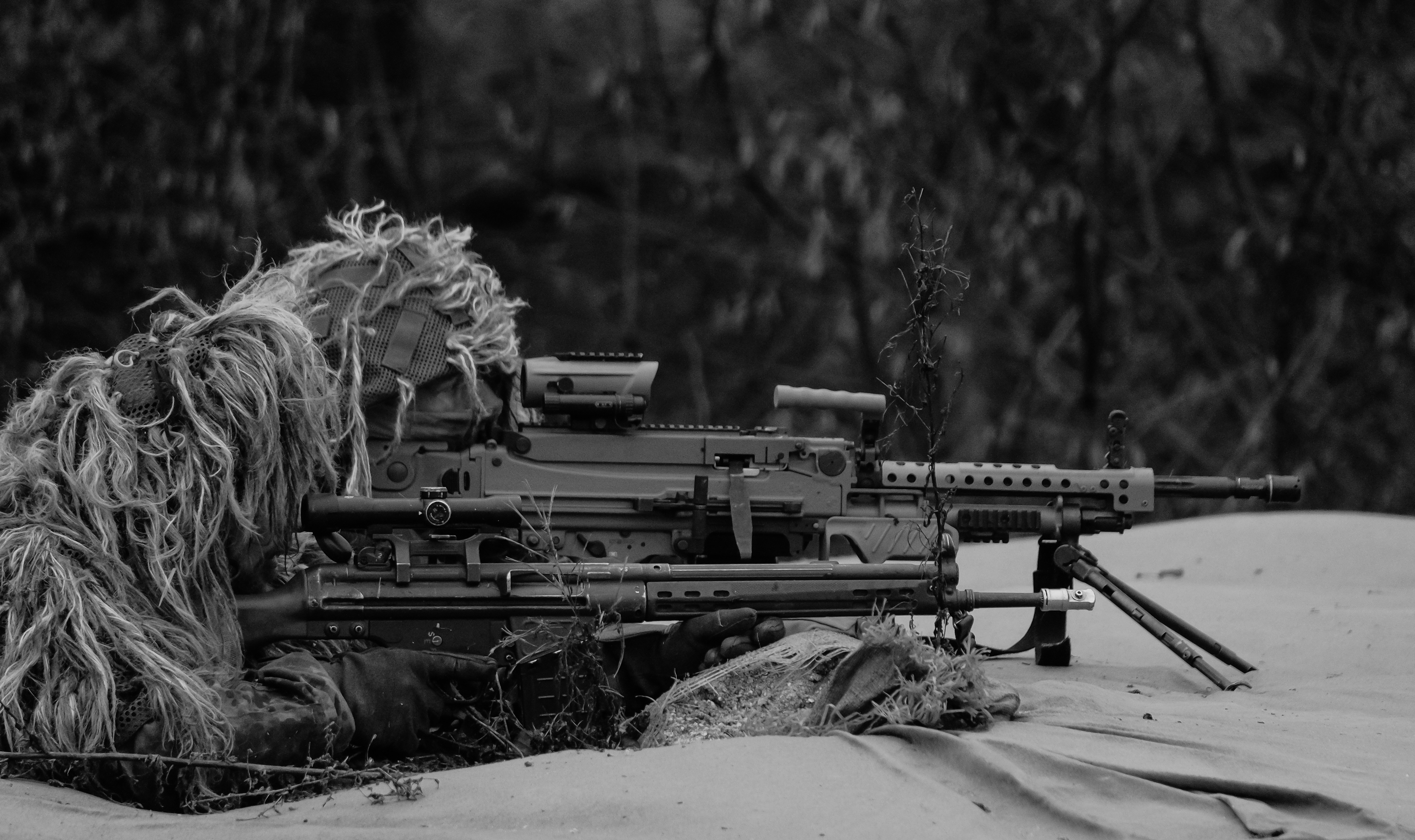
German soldier at the back armed with an MG5

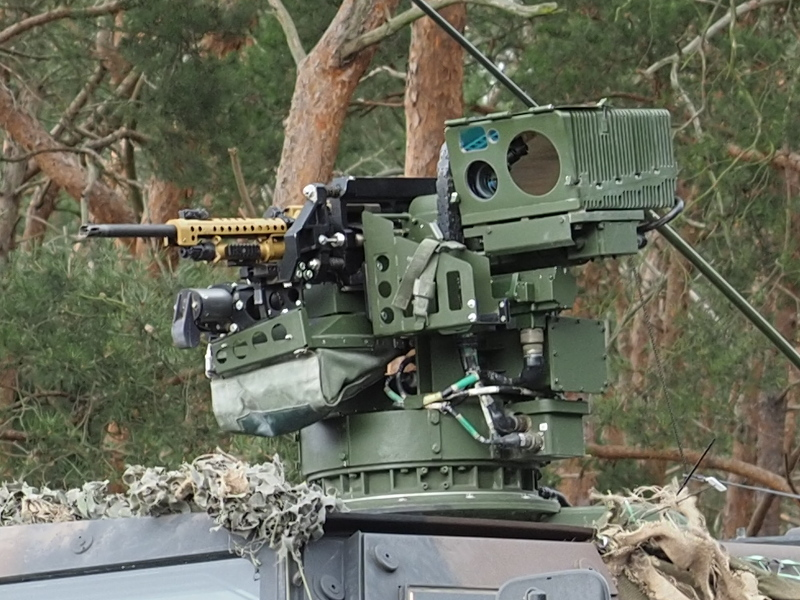
MG5 A1 armed FLW 100 remote weapon station mounted on a Bundeswehr ATF Dingo

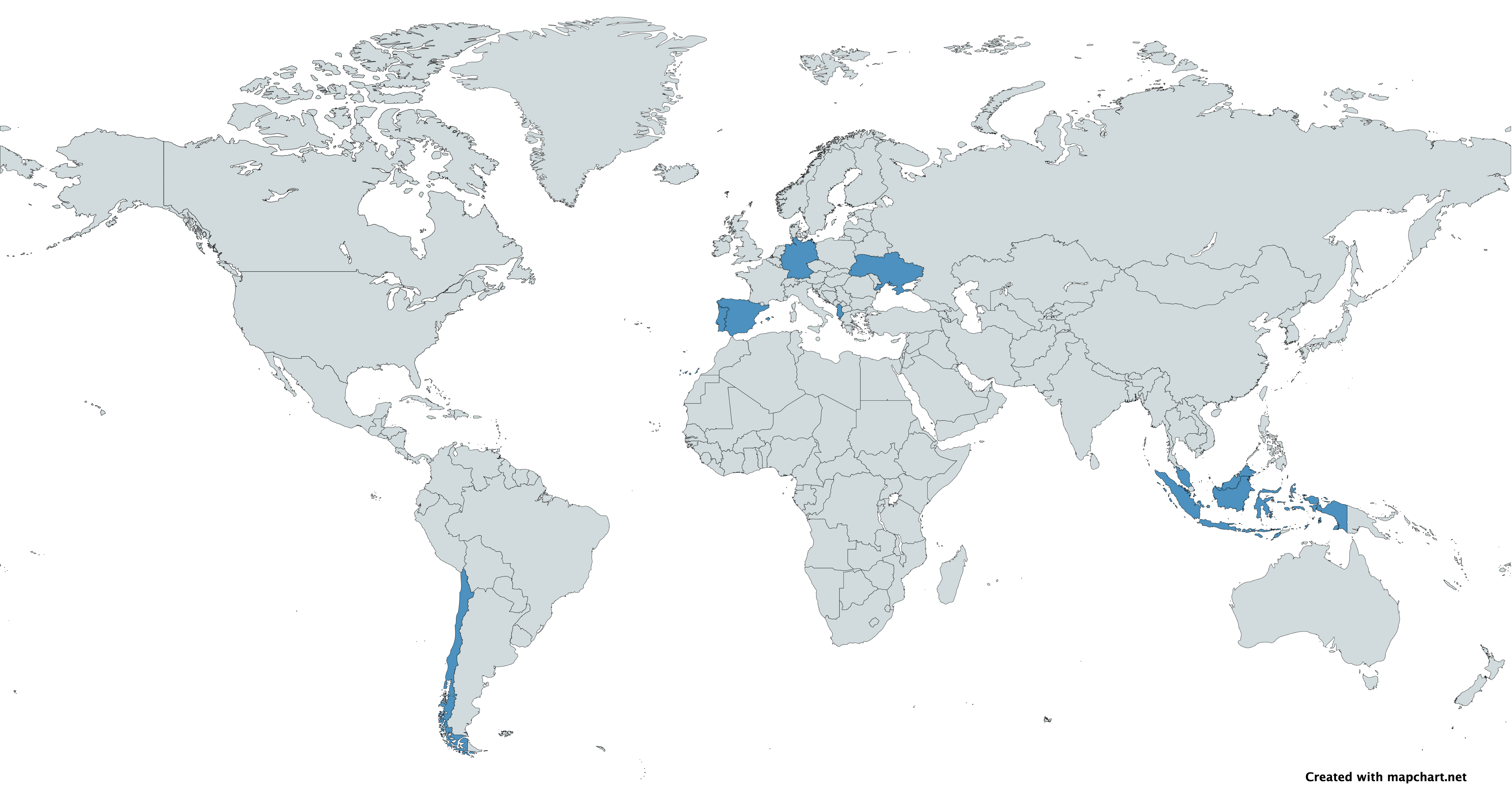
Map with Heckler & Koch MG5 users in blue

- Albania: Used by the Albanian Land Force.
- Chile: Acquired by the Chilean Marine Corps in 2014.
- Germany: Fifteen Bundeswehr pre-production guns designated as MG5. First batch of 1,215 MG5s ordered on 15 March 2015 for about €20 million. The procurement process of 12,733 units, with a price tag of about €200 million, has been delayed due to accuracy concerns. In September 2018 about 4,400 MG5s were delivered to the Bundeswehr. By the end of 2019 nearly 7,000 MG5s were expected to be delivered. Bundespolizei designated as MG5 A1 used on 42 ordered FLW 100 remote weapon stations for its armored vehicles. In June 2021 German media reported the Bundeswehr had 7,472 MG5s available and over 11,000 additional MG5s were ordered in a €175 million procurement. At the end of 2024 two thirds of these additional guns should be delivered, with the remainder to be delivered by 2025 and Germany strives to purchase nearly 19,000 MG5s with an option for nearly 4,000 additional units in the future.
- Indonesia: Used by Kopaska and Taifib unit of the Indonesian Navy.
- Malaysia: Used by Malaysian Maritime Enforcement Agency.
- Portugal: Used by Portuguese Air Force (NOTP, Core of Tactical Operations of Protection).
- Spain: Army's Special Operations Command.
- Ukraine: 350 as of July 2024.

== See also ==
- HK MG4
- FN EVOLYS
- FN MAG
- FN Minimi 7.62/Mk 48 machine gun
- IMI Negev NG7 series
- QJY-201
- SIG LMG 6.8
