= Type 67 machine gun =

Type 67
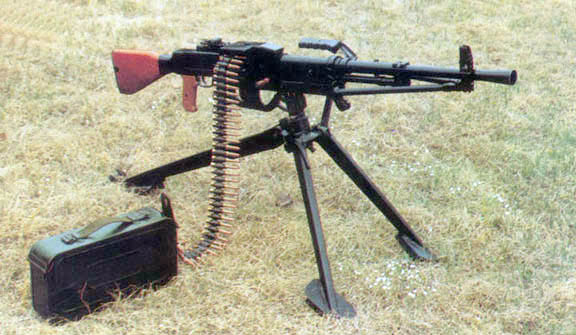
- The Type 67 on a tripod field mount
- Type: General-purpose machine gun
- Place of origin: People's Republic of China

Service history
- In service: 1967–present
- Used by: See Users
- Wars: Vietnam War; Lebanese Civil War; Sino-Vietnamese War; War in Afghanistan (2001-2021); Syrian Civil War; Yemeni Civil War

Production history
- Designer: Dr. Duo Ying Jian
- Designed: 1959
- Manufacturer: China North Industries Corporation
- Produced: 1967–
- Variants: Type 67-1, Type 67-2

Specifications
- Mass: 11 kg (24.25 lb)
- Length: 1,650 mm (65.0 in)
- Barrel length: 605 mm (23.8 in)
- Cartridge: 7.62×54mmR
- Action: Gas-operated, tilting breechblock
- Rate of fire: 650–700 rounds/min
- Effective firing range: 800–1000 m
- Feed system: 100/250-round belt
- Sights: Rear leaf sight, forward post

The Type 67 is a general-purpose machine gun, chambered in 7.62×54mmR formerly used by the People's Liberation Army.

== History ==
The Type 67 machine gun was developed as a lightweight replacement for the Type 53 (SG43) and Type 57 (SGM) medium 7.62 mm machine guns in 1959. The first tests for the Type 67 started in 1963. Research on the weapon was led by Dr. Duo Ying Jian from the Beijing Industrial Technology Academy. After Soviet-Chinese relations began to break down, there were concerns that further technological assistance would not be rendered, including supplying them with Soviet-made PKMs.

The first combat use of the Type 67 was with Mujahideen forces fighting in Afghanistan fighting against pro-Soviet forces in 1980. These found their way through smuggling in Pakistani soil. In the Syrian Civil War, the Type 67 is found in use with Syrian opposition forces fighting against government forces from 2015. It is suggested these were likely captured from Syrian troops. It has also been used in the Yemeni Civil War against the Houthis.

== Design history ==
According to a United States Army Materiel Command analysis, the Type 67 uses the DP trigger mechanism, the quick-change barrel of the SG-43, a gas regulator similar to the RPD, the ZB vz. 30 bolt mechanism, and a modified Maxim-type feed mechanism.

The furniture was made in wood with the integral non-detachable bipod attached to a gas tube. For using the Type 67 at long range, a tripod can be used when needed. The Type 67 was initially supposed to be used as a medium machine gun (exclusively with a tripod), but Chinese engineers studied a captured M60 GPMG from American-led military forces in the Vietnam War. Further design revisions were made where the bipod was made standard to be used.

Since 1967, the Type 67 has gone through two model modifications and improvements, with the newer models designated Type 67-1 and Type 67-2.

=== Variants ===
- Type 67-1: This has a non-fluted barrel with the bipod clamped to the barrel below the front. This can be removed. Furniture is made from plastic.
- Type 67-2: Uses the same barrel, but lighter. Tripod is used instead of a bipod, made from stamped steel instead of steel tubing. The gunner can attach a telescopic or night sight. On late production models, the AA sight base is removed.

== Users ==
- Bangladesh
- Cambodia
- Central African Republic
- Equatorial Guinea
- North Korea
- Palestine: Palestine Liberation Organization
- Syria: Used by the SAA and by Free Syrian Army
- Tanzania
- Turkey
- Yemen
- Ukraine

=== Former ===
- China
- Vietnam: Vietcong and the North Vietnamese Army.

=== Non-state actors ===
- Islamic State of Iraq and the Levant
