= FN EVOLYS =

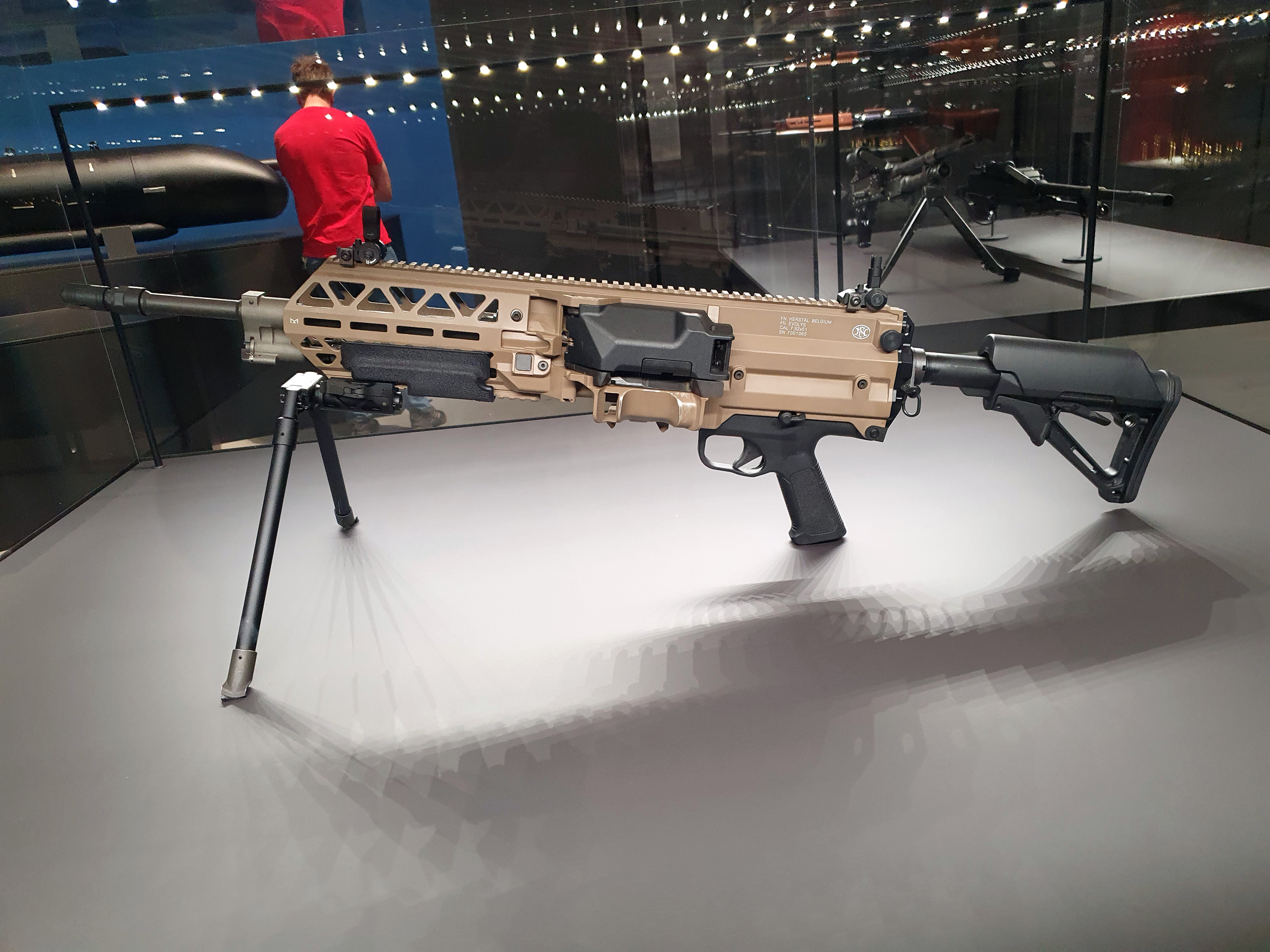
- FN EVOLYS with bipod
- Type: Light machine gun
- Place of origin: Belgium

Production history
- Manufacturer: FN Herstal
- Produced: 2021–present

Specifications
- Mass: ± 5.5 kg/11.025 lb (5.56 mm) ± 6.2 kg/13.227 lb (7.62 mm)
- Length: Fully extended: 950mm (37.40"); Fully retracted: 850mm (33.46") (5.56 mm); Fully extended: 1,025mm (40.35"); Fully retracted: 925mm (36.42") (7.62 mm)
- Barrel length: 355mm (14") (5.56 mm); 406mm (16") (7.62 mm)
- Width: 133 mm (5.56 mm); 135 mm (7.62 mm)
- Cartridge: 5.56×45mm NATO; 7.62×51mm NATO
- Action: Gas operated short-stroke piston, open bolt
- Rate of fire: Cyclic rate: 750 RPM
- Maximum firing range: 800 m (5.56 mm); 1000 m (7.62 mm)
- Feed system: 100 or 200 round ammunition belt (5.56 mm); 50 round ammunition belt (7.62 mm)

The FN EVOLYS is a light machine gun designed by FN Herstal in 2021, chambered for 5.56×45mm NATO and 7.62×51mm NATO. The EVOLYS was designed to be lighter and more ergonomic than other machine guns, such as the FN Minimi.

== History ==
On 22 April 2021, FN Herstal created a teaser trailer, showcasing a new machine gun with the title "A New Chapter Begins".

On 6 May 2021 FN Herstal released a 20-minute promotional video, discussing the new design, including its technical aspects, and revealing its name: the EVOLYS.

In September 2021, the EVOLYS was first displayed to the public at the Defence and Security Equipment International trade show in London, and it began to enter pre-production the same month.

== Design ==
The EVOLYS was designed from the ground up for use in urban warfare, which has become more common, and which holds specific requirements. Rather than taking the base of fire from a squad, the EVOLYS was designed to improve the amount of firepower that could be provided by a single soldier. It is select fire, with the option between semi-automatic and fully automatic fire modes. The EVOLYS uses a lateral feed mechanism with the belt at a 45° angle, and it is fully ambidextrous, with all its controls accessible on both its sides, and it can be loaded with one hand.

The firing operation is unusual as it uses an open bolt, firing with a separate hammer upside down inside the upper receiver. This prevents accidents and runaways as even if the bolt moves forward, it won't fire unless the hammer is released by a trigger pull. A single accessory rail mounted on the top of the receiver allows for the mounting of various optics, allowing for better target acquisition. Previous machine gun designs had to use multiple rails, which were not integral to the receiver, making the attachment and usage of optics more difficult. Due to the increased use of suppressors, the EVOLYS was designed to be capable of having a suppressor permanently fitted without it affecting the weapon's performance.

The EVOLYS was constructed using 3D printing and polymers, which help to reduce its weight. At 5.5 kilograms (12 lb), the EVOLYS is up to 30% lighter than competing machine guns such as the FN Minimi. The EVOLYS is chambered for 5.56×45mm and 7.62×51mm, with 6.5mm Creedmoor and .260 Remington variants in development for potential use by special forces.

== Operators ==
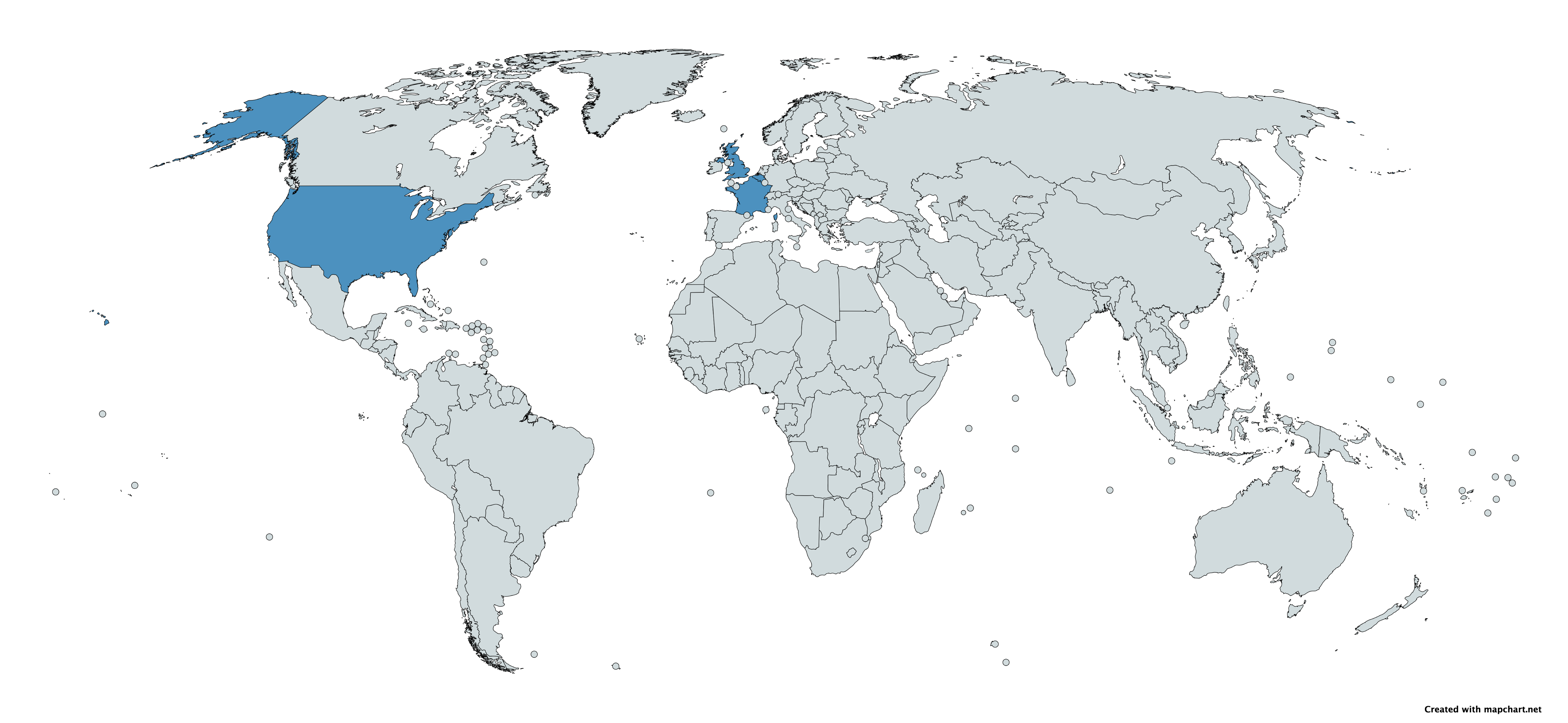
Map with EVOLYS users in blue

=== Current operators ===
France
- French Special Forces ordered in 2022.
- French Army: contract signed in June 2026 for up to 5,000 machine guns.
  - First order: 2,000 machine guns (EVOLYS 5.56, EVOLYS 7.62, and also FN Minimi Mk3)

=== Evaluation ===
Belgium
Belgian Armed Forces: 20 EVOLYS bought
United Kingdom
British Army: Test purposes
United States
United States Army:
- Test purposes in Next Generation Squad Weapon Program (6.8mm)
- Irregular Warfare Technical Support Directorate
  - Test purposes in Lightweight Intermediate Caliber Cartridge (6.5×43mm) Program, as the LICC-AMG (Assault Machine Gun)

== See also ==
- Knight's Armament Company LAMG
- QJS-161
- QJY-201
- RPL-20
- SIG LMG 6.8
