= CS/LR4 =

Bolt-action sniper rifle

CS/LR4 (NSG-1) 7.62 mm High-Precision Sniper System
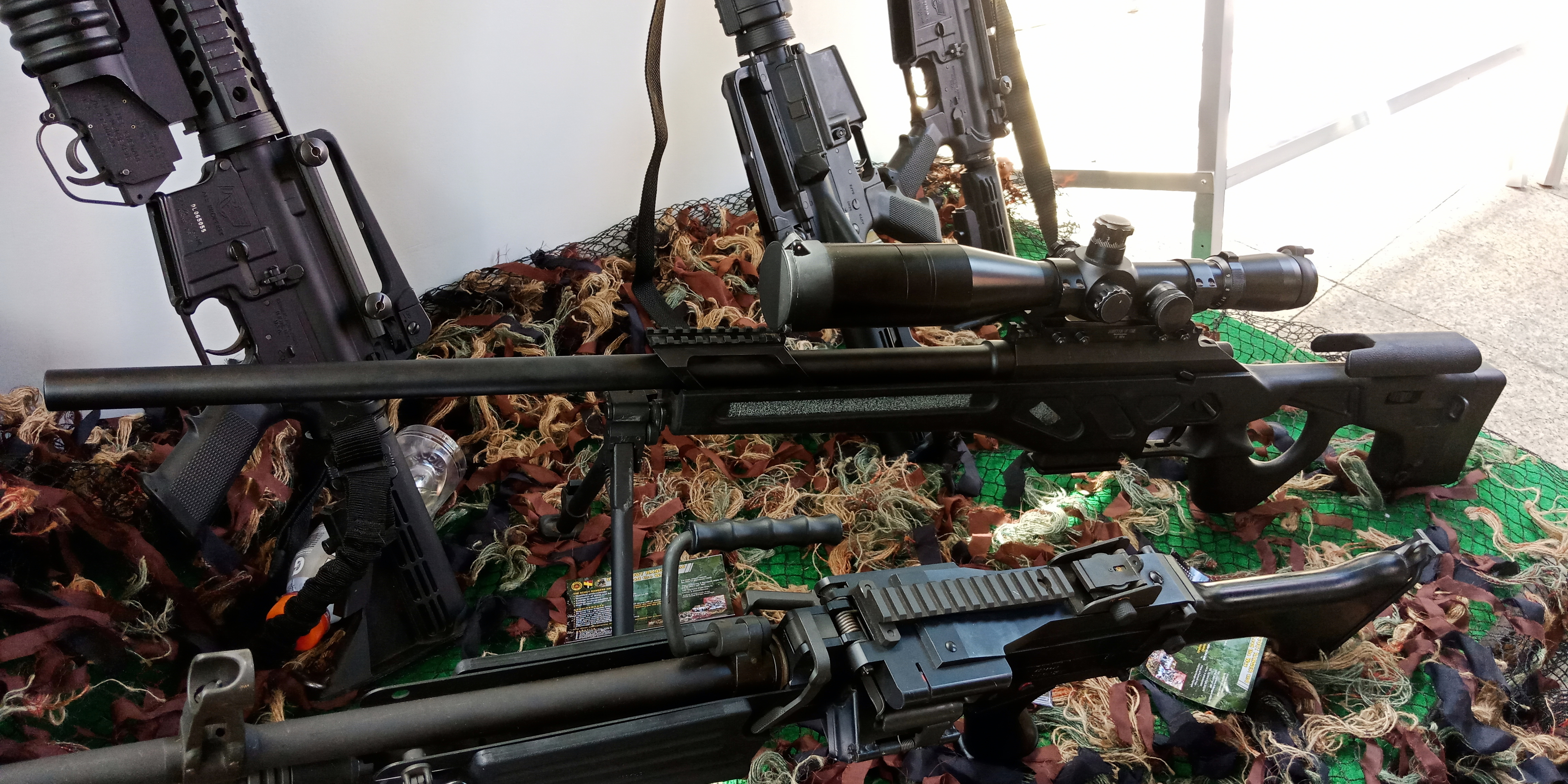
- CS/LR4 sniper rifle at Philippine Army 121st Anniversary Exhibition
- Type: Bolt-action sniper rifle
- Place of origin: People's Republic of China

Service history
- In service: 2012-Present
- Used by: See Users

Production history
- Designed: 2008
- Manufacturer: Norinco
- Variants: See Variants

Specifications
- Mass: 6.5 kg (14 lb) (CS/LR4); 6.4 kg (14 lb) (CS/LR4A); 6 kg (13 lb) (CS/LR35)
- Length: 1,100 mm (43.3 in) (CS/LR4); 1,150 mm (45.3 in) (CS/LR4A); 1,200 mm (47.2 in) (CS/LR35)
- Barrel length: 610 mm (24.0 in) (CS/LR4); 680 mm (26.8 in) (CS/LR4A)
- Cartridge: CS/DFL3 (7.62×51mm NATO) and .308 Winchester (CS/LR4); 8.6×70mm DBU-202 (QBU-202); 7.62×51mm DBU-203 (QBU-203); 5.8x42mm DBU-141 (CS/LR3)
- Action: Bolt-action
- Effective firing range: 600–1,000 m (656.2–1,093.6 yd) (CS/LR4); 800–1,200 m (874.9–1,312.3 yd) (CS/LR4A); 1,200–1,500 m (1,312.3–1,640.4 yd) (CS/LR35)
- Feed system: 5-round detachable box magazine 10-round detachable box magazine (CS/LR3)
- Sights: Telescopic; night-vision; thermal sight

The CS/LR4 7.62 mm High-Precision Sniper Rifle System (Chinese: CS/LR4 7.62毫米高精度狙击步枪系统; pinyin: Qī diǎn liù'èr Háomǐ Gāo jīngdù jūjī bùqiāng xìtǒng), also known as NSG-1, is a bolt-action sniper rifle designed and manufactured by Chinese company Norinco. The rifle features a free-floating barrel and is chambered in the specifically designed CS/DFL3 (7.62×51mm) high-precision cartridge in a 5-round box magazine, while can also accept other .308 Winchester ammunition.

The CS/LR4 is called a "system" because it consists of not only the rifle, but also dedicated telescopic sights, specifically designed ammunition, a ballistic calculation/rangefinder binoculars and other accessories.

== Design and development ==
The CS/LR4 is the successor to the JS 7.62mm sniper rifle, which was designed by Jianshe Industries (Group) Corporation of Chongqing in 2003. The development of the CS/LR4 started around 2008. The weapon system was adopted by the Chinese police force and People's Armed Police around 2012. The weapon does not have an official military designation from the People's Liberation Army and only saw limited use by special operation forces.

The CS/LR4 is largely similar to 5.8×42mm CS/LR3 (QBU-141) with an enlarged, accurized barrel chambered in 7.62×51mm. The gun is a manually operated bolt-action rifle. It features rotary bolt and free-floating barrel. A fixed, thumb-hole style stock is made from polymer, with fully adjustable (top-down and front-rear) buttpad, cheek rest, and integrated monopod. A segment of picatinny rail is mounted on top of the ejection window, with another segment mounted on top of the barrel for thermal/night vision sight. The picatinny rail is supported by the handguard without touching the barrel, thus maintaining the accuracy provided by the free-floating design. CS/LR4 has a double-stage trigger to facilitate precision shooting, and the pull weight can be customized between 8N and 15N. The accuracy is 1MOA at 600 m (660 yd).

The assorted sighting device of the CS/LR4 system includes CS/OS15 (8x-32x) daylight scope, CS/OS20A (4x-15x) daylight scope, and night-vision devices.

=== CS/LR4A ===
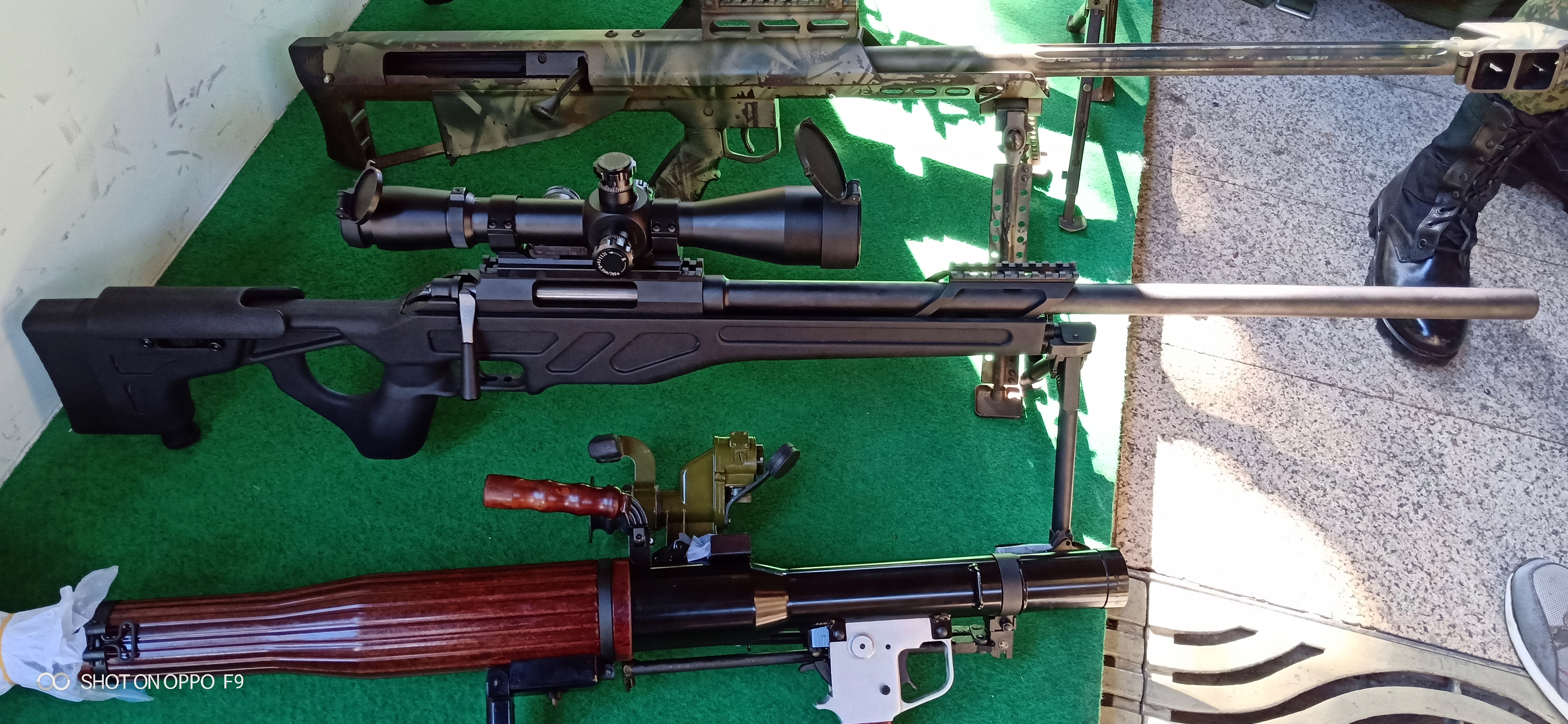
CS/LR4A showcased at 122nd Anniversary Caravan of the Philippine Army.

CS/LR4A is the improved variant of CS/LR4. The new variant has extended barrel which is approximately 27 in (685.8 mm) long. CS/OS15 (8x-32x) scope is improved with wider field of view (FOV). A new scope with better ergonomics design and lower magnification (4x-15x) called CS/OS20 is also introduced.

=== CS/LR35 ===
CS/LR35 is the further development of CS/LR4. CS/LR35 is available in two versions chambered in either 7.62×51mm NATO or 8.6×70mm Lapua Magnum. Improvements include reinforced material for the barrel, lightweight rifle body, fully adjustable folding stock, and CS/DEL3A high precision cartridge in a 5-round box magazine. The weight is less than 6 kg (13 lb). The accuracy is claimed to be ≤0.5MOA at 100 m (110 yd), ≤0.75MOA at 300 m (330 yd), and ≤1MOA at 800 m (870 yd).

The 8.6×70mm variant of the rifle can be differentiated by its slightly longer barrel with a handguard that only has four ventilation holes whereas the 7.62 variant has seven smaller ones. The manufacturer claims that, with 8.6×70mm ammunition, the weapon has a conservative estimate of sub 1MOA accuracy at 1,200 m (1,300 yd).

In Chinese military service, the 8.6×70mm variant of the CS/LR35 received the designation QBU-202 with its scope designated QMK-201 variable zoom optics. 7.62×51mm variant of the CS/LR35 received designation QBU-203 with its scope designated QMK-201A.

Both CS/LR35 variants with minor modifications were rebranded as CS/LR24 (for 8.6×70mm Lapua Magnum) and CS/LR4B (for 7.62×51mm).

== Variants ==
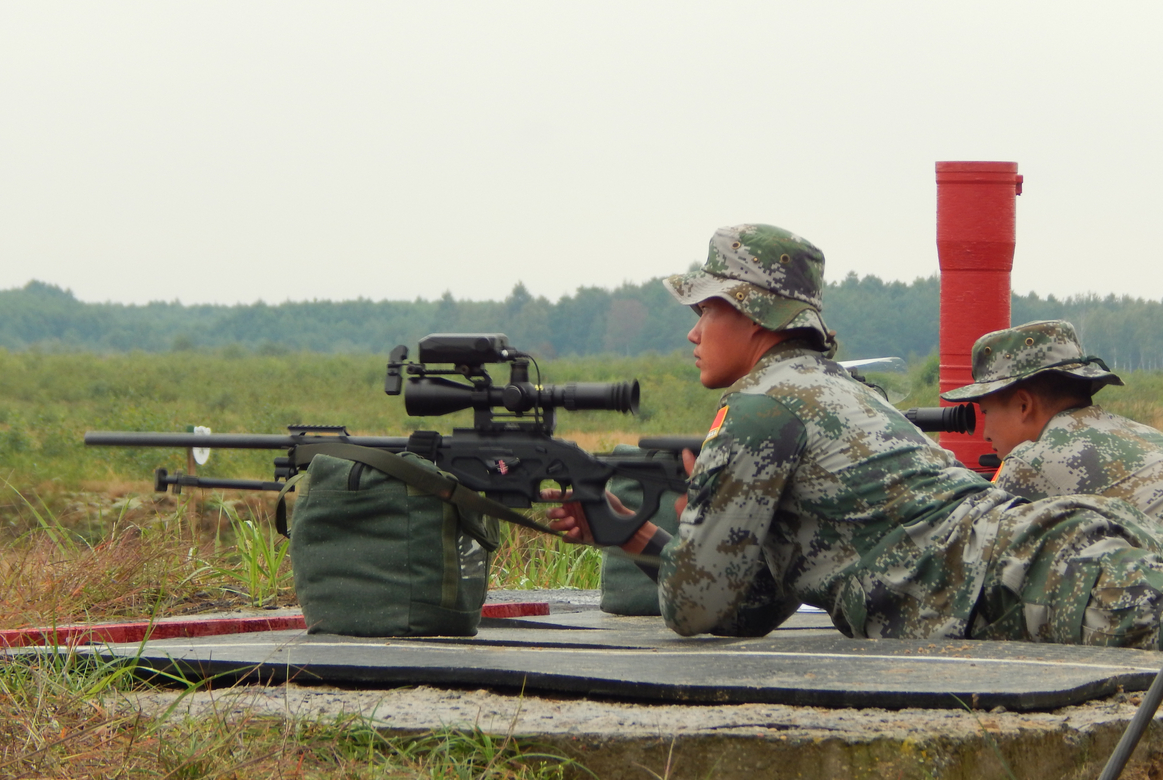
PLAGF sniper team armed with CS/LR4

JS 7.62mm
Prototype designed by Jianshe Industries (Group) Corporation in 2003. First marketed in 2005. The weapon is chambered in 7.62×54mmR.
CS/LR4
The successor to JS 7.62mm. Chambered in 7.62×51mm.
CS/LR4A
Improved version of CS/LR4 with reduced weight and longer barrel. Chambered in 7.62×51mm. Accuracy is improved to ≤1MOA (at 600 m (660 yd)) and overall longer effective range.
CS/LR35
Military designation QBU-202 and QBU-203. Improved version of CS/LR4. Chambered in 8.6×70mm Lapua Magnum and 7.62×51mm.
CS/LR3
Military designation QBU-141. Chambered in 5.8×42mm. Unlike the CS/LR4, it feeds from a 10-round magazine. The CS/LR3 was shown off in 2009 as part of the 3rd China International Police Equipment and Anti-Terrorism Technology Equipment Exhibition and is intended to be used by police forces.

== Users ==
- People's Republic of China:
  - People's Armed Police, People's Police of China, People's Liberation Army Special Operations Forces - CS/LR4, CS/LR4A.
  - People's Liberation Army Ground Force - QBU-202, QBU-203.
- Philippines: Philippine Army - CS/LR4A.
- Venezuela: Venezuelan Marine Corps - CS/LR4

== See also ==
- CS/LR3
- CS/LR35
