= JS 7.62 =

JS 7.62mm
- Type: Sniper rifle
- Place of origin: China

Service history
- In service: 2005–present
- Used by: See Users

Production history
- Designer: Jianshe Industries (Group) Corporation
- Designed: 2003–2004
- Manufacturer: China South Industries Group

Specifications
- Mass: 5.5 kg
- Length: 1030mm
- Barrel length: 600mm
- Cartridge: 7.62×54mmR
- Action: Bolt-Action
- Muzzle velocity: 790 m/s
- Effective firing range: 800m
- Feed system: 5-round detachable box magazine
- Sights: 3-9×40, 6-24×44 telescopic sights. All other scopes can be mounted via picatinny railing

The JS 7.62mm (Chinese: JS 7.62mm狙击步枪) is a bolt-action sniper rifle issued in small numbers to the People's Liberation Army, People's Armed Police, and to Public Security Police forces. It's developed under the Jianshe Industries (Group) Corporation.

== History ==
The JS 7.62mm sniper rifle was designed in early 2003 due to the need for a dedicated sniper rifle that could place precision shots within an 800-meter range, using the 7.62mm round. The 7.62 JS sniper rifle variant project was designed simultaneously with the 12.7 JS anti-materiel sniper rifle. In the Beijing International Exhibition on Police Equipment held in May 2005, the exhibition showed the JS 7.62 sniper rifle after undergoing 8 months with field trails. Feedback showed that the sniper rifle system allowed the 7.62mm round to penetrate a residential wall greater than 6mm, and showed high tolerance level with no malfunction throughout the 8 month field test.

Zouyi Hong was appointed to be the leading designer of the JS 7.62 sniper rifle.

The CS/LR4 is the successor to the JS 7.62 sniper rifle. Development of CS/LR4 started around 2008 by Jianshe Industries (Group) Corporation and Norinco's 208 Institute. The weapon system is adopted by Chinese police force and People's Armed Police around 2012.

== Design details ==
The JS 7.62mm Sniper Rifle uses the Russian 7.62×54mmR round, which is also used in the People's Liberation Army designated marksmen rifles Type 79 and Type 85. The JS 7.62 has a conventional design, holding a 5-round detachable box magazine forward to the hand grip. It uses a pistol grip design with safety selector located on the right, beside the bolt handle. Mostly made of high strength light aluminum alloy, it weighs at 5.5 kg without loaded magazine. Similar to most modern era sniper rifles, it utilizes a new triangular muzzle brake design reducing recoil. An adjustable rubber cheek rest that allows elevation for user preference, and quick detachable scope mounting system on top of the barrel allowing x3 to x9 telescopic day and night sights. A Picatinny rail is mounted on the upper receiver, allowing the user to switch to any day/night telescope sight.

Emphasizing on accuracy, attention was paid to the smooth trigger pull, making the trigger pull shorter, lighter and smoother to increase accuracy. During several tests, it was found that the JS 7.62 shoots more accurately than the QBU-88.

== Users ==
- Bangladesh: In small numbers.
- China

== See also ==
- CS/LR4
