= 7.62×51mm NATO =

Rimless, centerfire, bottlenecked rifle cartridge

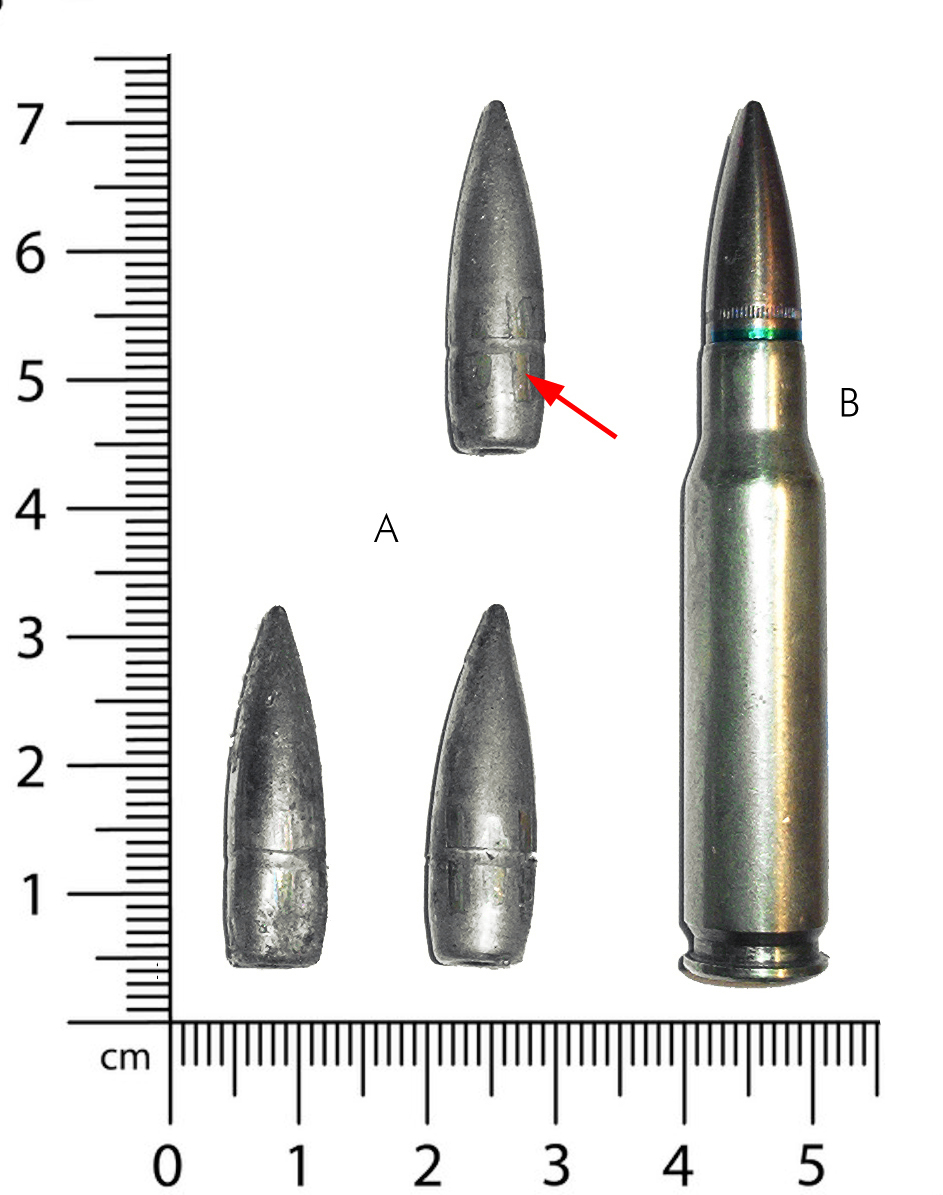
- Unfired 7.62×51mm NATO round (B) next to three recovered bullets, showing rifling marks (A)
- Type: Rifle, General Purpose Machine Gun
- Place of origin: United States

Service history
- In service: 1954–present
- Used by: NATO and others
- Wars: Vietnam War, Six-Day War, Yom Kippur War, Iran–Iraq War, Falklands War, The Troubles, Gulf War, War in Afghanistan, Iraq War, Libyan Civil War, Syrian Civil War, Yemeni Civil War (2014–present), Saudi Arabian-led intervention in Yemen, among other conflicts

Production history
- Designed: 1944–1949

Specifications
- Parent case: T-65 experimental cartridge series (derived from the .300 Savage and .30-06 Springfield)
- Case type: Rimless, bottleneck
- Bullet diameter: 0.308 in (7.82 mm)
- Land diameter: 0.300 in (7.62 mm)
- Neck diameter: 0.345 in (8.8 mm)
- Shoulder diameter: 0.454 in (11.5 mm)
- Base diameter: 0.470 in (11.9 mm)
- Rim diameter: 0.473 in (12.0 mm)
- Rim thickness: 0.050 in (1.3 mm)
- Case length: 2.015 in (51.2 mm)
- Overall length: 2.800 in (71.1 mm)
- Rifling twist: 1 in 12 in (304.8 mm)
- Primer type: Berdan or Large rifle
- Maximum pressure (NATO EPVAT): 60,191 psi (415.00 MPa)

Ballistic performance
Bullet mass/type	Velocity	Energy
130 gr (8 g) M80A1 EPR	930 m/s (3,100 ft/s)	3,640 J (2,680 ft⋅lbf)
147 gr (10 g) M80 FMJ	853 m/s (2,800 ft/s)	3,469 J (2,559 ft⋅lbf)
150.5 gr (10 g) M59 mild steel core FMJ	856 m/s (2,810 ft/s)	3,590 J (2,650 ft⋅lbf)
175 gr (11 g) M118 long range BTHP	792 m/s (2,600 ft/s)	3,561 J (2,626 ft⋅lbf)
- Test barrel length: 22 in (559 mm) (M80 and M59); 24 in (610 mm) (M118 Long Range); Sources: M80: TM 9-1005-298-12, 7 August 1969, TM 9-1005-224-10, July 1985, M118 Long Range: U.S. Armament

The 7.62×51mm NATO (official NATO nomenclature 7.62 NATO) is a rimless, bottlenecked, centerfire rifle cartridge. It is a standard for small arms among members of the North Atlantic Treaty Organisation (NATO).

First developed in the 1940s, the cartridge was introduced in U.S. service in 1954 for the M14 rifle and M60 machine gun.

The later adoption of the 5.56×45mm NATO intermediate cartridge and assault rifles as standard infantry weapon systems by NATO militaries started a trend to phase out the 7.62×51mm NATO in that role. Many other firearms that use the 7.62×51mm NATO fully powered cartridge remain in service today, especially various designated marksman rifles/sniper rifles and medium machine guns/general-purpose machine guns (e.g. M24 Sniper Rifle and M240 Medium Machine Gun). The cartridge is also used on mounted and crew-served weapons mounted on vehicles, aircraft, and ships.

== Development ==
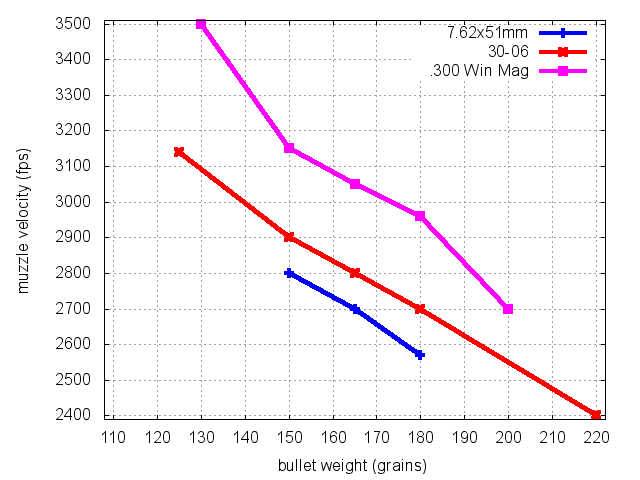
Velocity comparison between the 7.62×51mm NATO, .30-06 Springfield, and .300 Winchester Magnum for common bullet weights

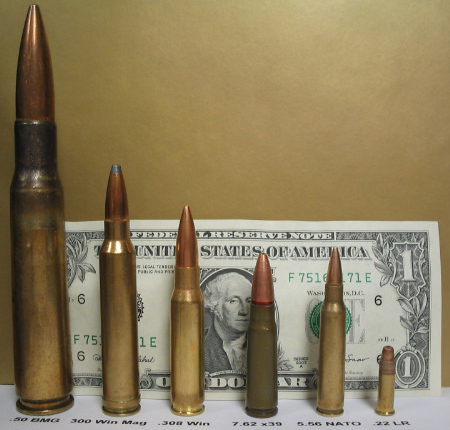
.50 BMG, .300 Winchester Magnum, .308 Winchester, 7.62×39mm, 5.56 NATO, and .22 LR

Work that eventually developed the 7.62×51mm NATO started just after World War I when the large, powerful .30-06 Springfield cartridge proved difficult to adapt to semi-automatic rifles. A less powerful cartridge would allow a lighter firing mechanism. At the time, the most promising design was the .276 Pedersen. When it was eventually shown that the .30-06 Springfield was suitable for semi-automatic rifles, the .276 Pedersen was dropped.

Thus, when war appeared to be looming again, only a couple of decades later, the .30-06 Springfield was the only round available, and the M1 Garand provided U.S. troops with greater firepower than their bolt action-armed opponents. The Garand performed so well that the U.S. saw little need to replace it during World War II, and the .30-06 Springfield served well beyond the Korean War and into the mid-1950s. The .30-06 Springfield was officially replaced by the 7.62 NATO M14 in 1957.

During the 1940s and early 1950s, several experiments were carried out to improve the M1 Garand semi-automatic rifle. One of the most common complaints was the limited-capacity eight-round en-bloc clip, and many experimental designs modified the weapon to use a detachable box magazine. Springfield Armory's T20 rifle was a fully automatic version. Though not adopted, experience with a fully-automatic Garand laid the groundwork for its replacement. The test program continued for several years, including both the original .30-06 Springfield round and experimental cartridges.

=== T65 series experimental cartridges ===
During the 1940s, the .300 Savage became the basis for experiments on behalf of the U.S. Military that resulted in the development of the T65 series of experimental cartridges. The original experimental case design by the Frankford Arsenal was designated the T65 and was similar to the .300 Savage case, but with less taper. The experimental cases were made from standard .30-06 Springfield cases, which had slightly less capacity than standard .300 Savage cases because the Frankford Arsenal cases had slightly thicker case walls. The later T65 iterations were made from shortened .30-06 Springfield cases and were longer compared to the original T65 case, as the .300 Savage has a shorter case length than the resulting 7.62 NATO. The resulting cartridges provided a ballistic performance roughly equal to the U.S. military .30-06 Springfield 1906 pattern M1906 and 1938 pattern M2 service cartridges. Over forty years of technical progress in the field of propellants allowed for similar service cartridge performance – firing a 147 grains (9.53 g) bullet at 2,750 ft/s (838 m/s) with 2,468 ft⋅lbf (3,346 J) muzzle energy – from a significantly shorter, smaller case with less case capacity. The eventual result of this competition was the T44 rifle.

Designation	Case	Description	Manufacturer	Metric
T65	T65 case (47 mm)	Steel jacket lead core 150-grain (9.7 g) flat base bullet	Frankford Arsenal	7.62×47mm
T65E1	FAT1 case (49 mm)	Steel jacket lead core	Frankford Arsenal	7.62×49mm
T65E2	FAT1E1 (49 mm – 30° shoulder)	Steel jacket lead core	Frankford Arsenal	7.62×49mm
T65E3	FAT1E3 (51 mm – 20° shoulder)	Steel jacket lead core	Frankford Arsenal	7.62×51mm
T65E4	FAT1E3 (51 mm – 20° shoulder)	Steel jacket lead core 145-grain (9.4 g) boat-tail bullet with a No. 10 ogive point	Frankford Arsenal	7.62×51mm
T65E5	FAT1E3 (51 mm – 20° shoulder)	Steel jacket lead core boat-tail bullet	Frankford Arsenal	7.62×51mm

When the United States developed the T65 cartridge, the British military took a different route. They had spent considerable time and effort developing the intermediate-power .280 British (7 mm) cartridge with an eye towards controllable fully automatic fire. The U.S. held to its desire not to reduce the effectiveness of individual aimed shots. The American philosophy was to use automatic fire only in emergencies and continue to use semi-automatic fire for the majority of the time. After considerable debate, the Canadian Army announced they would be happy to use the .280 but only if the U.S. did as well. It was clear the U.S. was not going to use the .280 British. The British did start introducing the .280 British along with the bull-pup Rifle No. 9, but the process was stopped in the interests of harmonization across NATO. The T65E5 (7.62×51mm) was chosen as NATO's standard cartridge in 1954.

Winchester saw a market for a civilian model of the late T65 series designs and introduced it in 1952, two years before NATO adopted the T65E5 experimental cartridge iteration as 7.62×51mm NATO in 1954. Winchester branded the cartridge and introduced it to the commercial hunting market as the .308 Winchester. The dimensions of .308 Winchester are almost the same as those of 7.62×51mm NATO. The chamber of the former has a marginally shorter headspace and thinner case walls than the latter, due to changes in specifications between 1952 and 1954. This allows 7.62×51mm NATO ammunition to feed reliably in rifles chambered for .308 Winchester, but can cause .308 Winchester ammunition cases to rupture when fired in rifles chambered for 7.62×51mm NATO.

=== Adoption in battle rifles ===
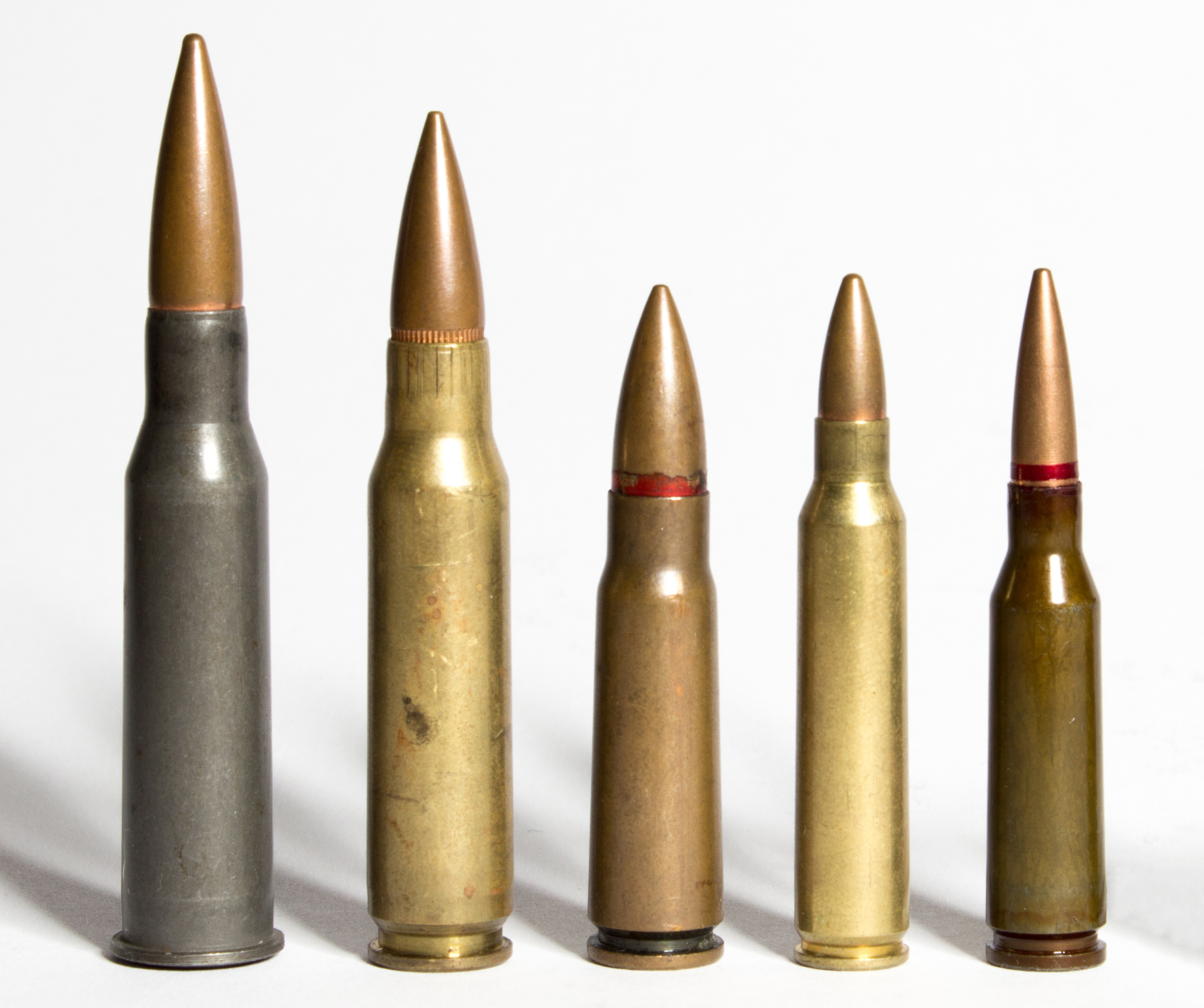
Service rifle cartridges loaded with projectiles: (left to right) 7.62×54mmR, 7.62×51mm NATO, 7.62×39mm, 5.56×45mm NATO, 5.45×39mm

The T44 rifle was adopted as the M14 rifle in 1957. Around the same time, Britain and Canada adopted the Belgian FN FAL (L1A1 SLR British) as the L1, followed by the West German army designated as the G1. The Germans soon transitioned to a modified version of the Spanish CETME rifle by Heckler & Koch that was adopted as the G3. With all of these firearms, it was clear that the 7.62×51mm NATO could not be fired controllably in fully automatic because of recoil. Both the M14 and FAL were later modified to limit fully automatic fire by introducing semi-automatic versions or selector locks. Efforts were also made to improve control with bipods or heavier barrels.

While this was going on, the U.S. Project SALVO concluded that a burst of four rounds into a 20-inch (51 cm) circle would cause twice the number of casualties as a fully automatic burst by one of these rifles, regardless of the size of the round. They suggested using a much smaller, .22 caliber, cartridge with two bullets per cartridge (a duplex load). At the same time, other researchers investigated the promising flechette rounds that were lighter but offered better penetration than even the .30-06.

When the M14 arrived in Vietnam, it was found to have a few disadvantages. The rifle's overall length was not well-suited for jungle warfare. Also, the weight of 7.62×51mm NATO cartridges limited the total amount of ammunition that could be carried in comparison with the 7.62×39mm cartridge of the Type 56 and AK-47 rifles, with which the Vietcong and North Vietnamese Army soldiers were equipped.

Fighting between the big-round and small-round groups reached a peak in the early 1960s, when test after test showed the .223 Remington (M193 5.56×45mm) cartridge fired from the AR-15 allowed an eight-soldier unit to outgun an 11-soldier unit armed with M14s at ranges closer than 300 m (328 yd). U.S. troops were able to carry more than twice as much 5.56×45mm ammunition as 7.62×51mm NATO for the same weight, which allowed them an advantage against a typical NVA unit armed with Type 56-1s.

Rifle	Cartridge	Cartridge weight	Weight of loaded magazine	Max. 10 kilogram ammo load
M14 (1959)	7.62×51mm NATO	393 grains (25.5 g)	20 rd magazine at 0.75 kilograms (1.7 lb)	13 magazines at 9.75 kilograms (21.5 lb) for 260 rounds
M16 (1962)	.223 Remington (M193 5.56×45mm)	183 grains (11.9 g)	20 rd magazine at 0.32 kilograms (0.71 lb)	31 magazines at 9.93 kilograms (21.9 lb) for 620 rounds
AK-47 (1949)	7.62×39mm	252 grains (16.3 g)	30 rd magazine at 0.82 kilograms (1.8 lb)	12 magazines at 9.2 kilograms (20 lb) for 360 rounds

In 1964, the U.S. Army began replacing its M14s with M16s, causing further compatibility issues. Regardless of the M14 having disadvantages in jungle warfare, 7.62×51mm NATO rifles stayed in military service around the world due to several factors. The 7.62×51mm NATO has proved much more effective than 5.56×45mm NATO at long ranges, and has since found popularity as a sniping round. For instance, the Mk 14 Enhanced Battle Rifle, an M14 variant, and the M25 sniper rifle were utilized in the United States military as designated marksman and sniper rifles, respectively. Shorter, easier-to-handle 7.62mm rifles like the G3 stayed in service due to their accuracy, range, cartridge effectiveness, and reliability. In addition, continued if limited use in infantry rifles is a logistical convenience, given the preference for 7.62×51mm NATO across NATO for general-purpose machine guns.

=== Specialized use ===
==== Sniper and designated marksman rifles ====
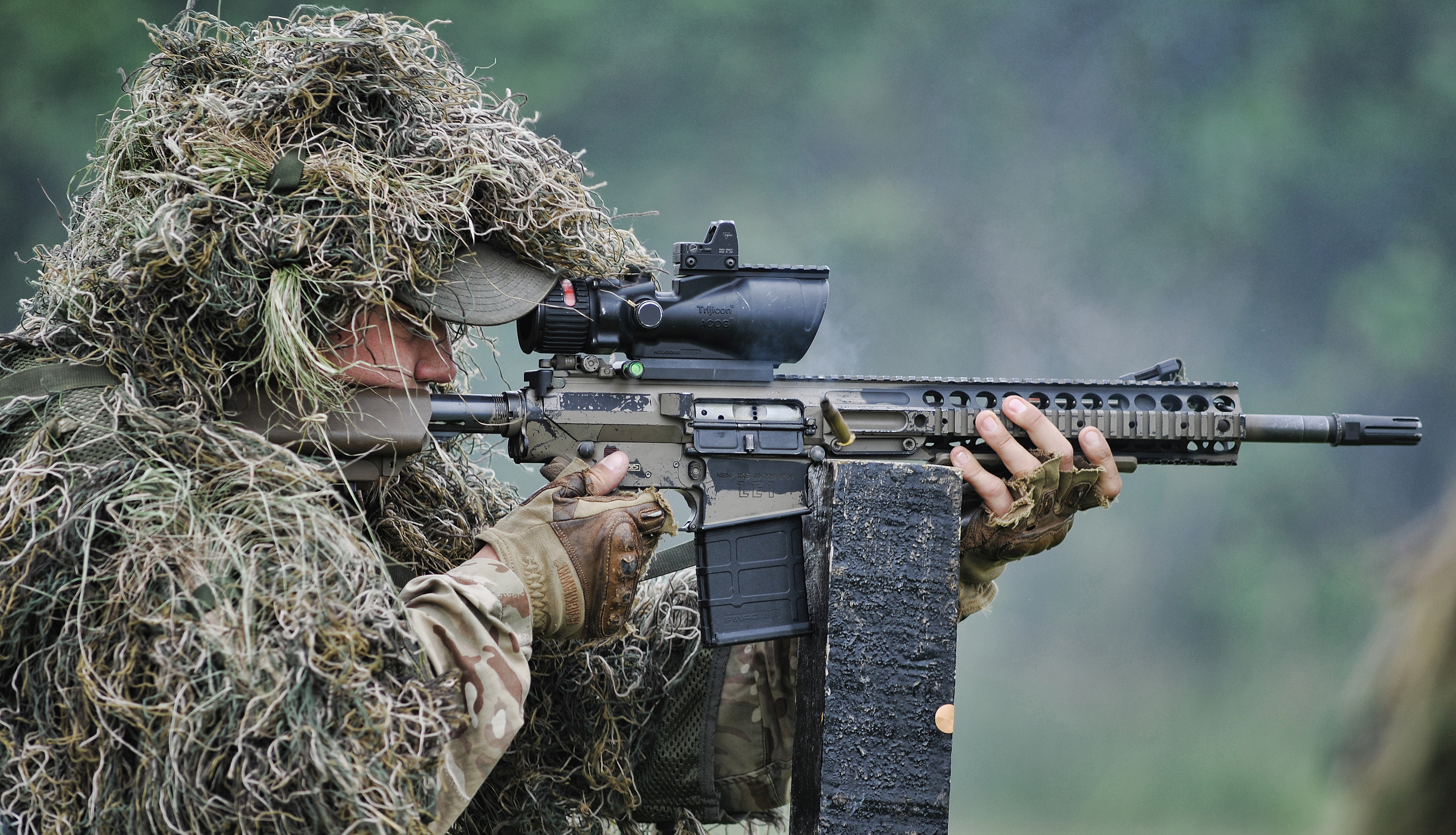
7.62×51mm NATO cartridge case ejection from a British L129A1 Sharpshooter Rifle after firing L59A1 "High Performance" ammunition featuring a 10 g (155 gr) bullet

Specialized loadings were created for 7.62×51mm NATO-chambered sniper rifles. They used heavier and more aerodynamic bullets that had a higher ballistic coefficient than standard ball rounds, meaning they shed velocity at longer ranges more gradually. Maintaining velocity is important for accurate long-range shots because dropping from supersonic to transonic speeds disturbs the flight of the bullet and adversely affects accuracy. The standard M80 ball round weighs 147 gr and, from an M14 rifle and M60 machine gun, has a muzzle velocity 200 ft/s (61 m/s) faster than the M118LR 175 gr sniping round. However, the M80 drops to subsonic velocity around 900 m (984 yd), while the initially slower M118LR is supersonic out to 1,000 m (1,094 yd) due to its low-drag bullet.

The 7.62×51mm NATO round remains in use in designated marksman rifles such as the Heckler & Koch HK417, SIG 716, FN SCAR, L129A1, Colt Canada C20 DMR and LMT MARS-H based riles to take advantage of the effective range and accuracy potential compared with intermediate rifle rounds. Designated marksman rifles have to be effective, in terms of hit rates and terminal ballistics, at application ranges exceeding those of ordinary assault rifles and battle rifles, but do not require the extended-range performance of a dedicated sniper rifle. Depending on the military, specialized 7.62×51mm NATO ammunition is sometimes issued to the designated marksman.

==== General-purpose machine guns ====
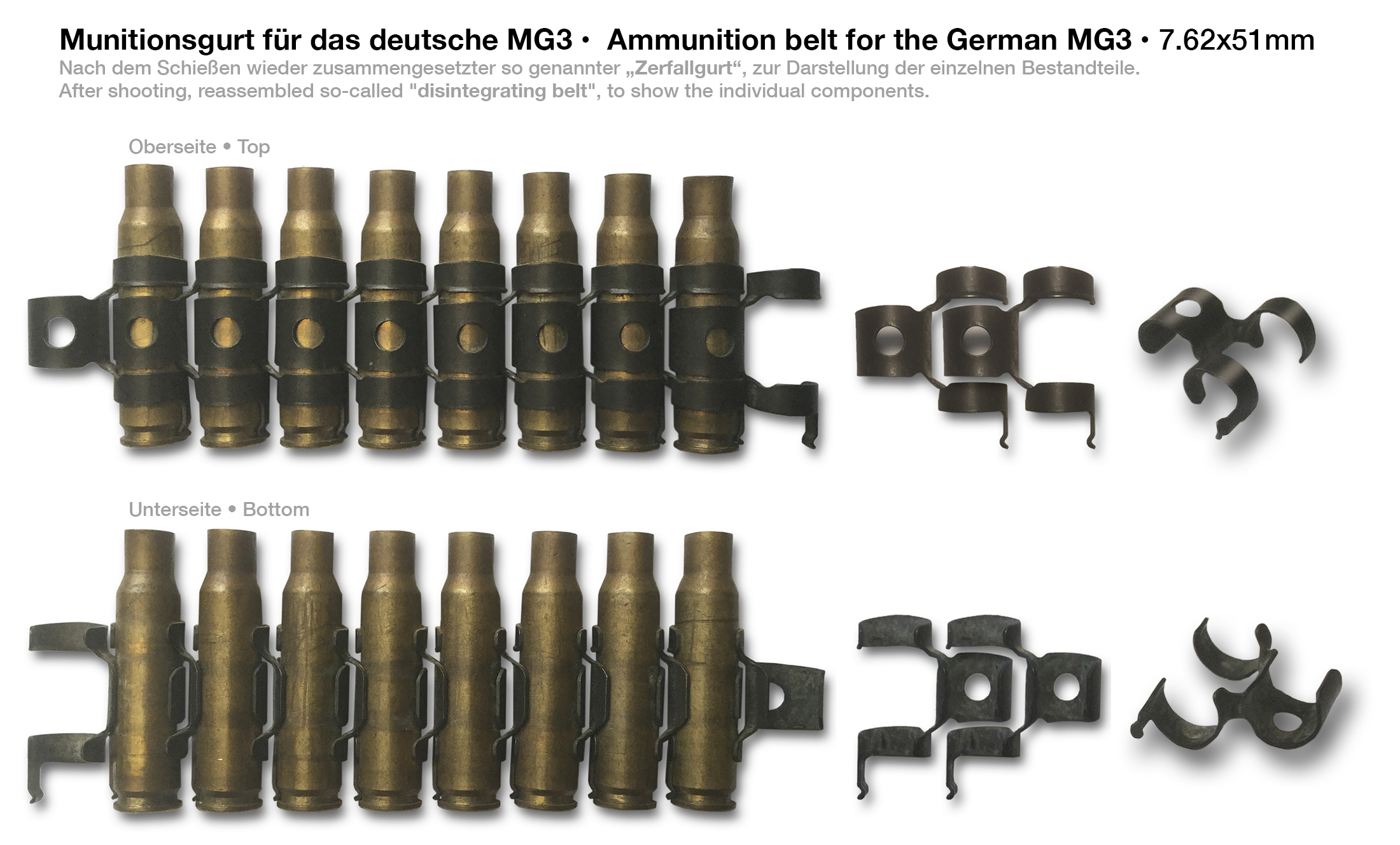
M13 links reassembled with 7.62×51mm NATO cartridges previously fired by a general-purpose machine gun

The 7.62×51mm NATO round nevertheless met the designers' demands for fully automatic reliability with a full-power round. It remains the main medium machine gun and general-purpose machine gun round for almost all NATO forces, even being used in adapted versions of older .30-06 Springfield machine guns, such as the WWII-era Browning M1919A4. The .303 British Bren gun was also converted to fire the 7.62×51mm NATO round, and the converted weapon was reclassified as the L4 Light machine gun. West Germany rechambered many of its WW2-era MG42s to create the MG2, and the succeeding MG3 is essentially a slightly modified version of the same weapon. These have been largely replaced in the light machine gun role by 5.56×45mm NATO weapons, such as the widespread use of the M249 SAW. However, the 7.62×51mm NATO fully powered cartridge is still the standard chambering for the M134 Minigun and GPMGs such as the M60E4, FN MAG/M240, HK21, MG3, AA-52, Vektor SS-77, UKM-2000 and MG5 and flexible mountings such as helicopters, jeeps, and tanks. It is also commonly found in coaxial mount applications, such as parallel to the main gun on tanks. The characteristics of 7.62 mm bullet types were not only researched in the 20th century but were also studied in the 21st century.

=== Post-2010 developments ===
The U.S. Army developed an improved version of the M80 7.62mm ball round, designated the M80A1. The M80A1 incorporates changes found in the M855A1 5.56 mm round. Like the M855A1, the M80A1 has better hard-target penetration, more consistent performance against soft targets, and significantly greater ranges of these effects than the M80. The bullet is redesigned with a copper jacket and exposed hardened steel penetrator, eliminating 114.5 grains (7.4 g) of lead with production of each M80A1 projectile. The M80A1 began fielding in September 2014. The Army plans to replace both the M80A1 Enhanced Performance Round and M993 Armor Piercing round with the XM1158 Advanced Armor Piercing Round (ADVAP) beginning in 2020. Its type designation progressed to M1158 and it has been in low-rate initial production since May 2019.

The U.S. Special Operations Command plans to begin fielding of the 6.5mm Creedmoor cartridge in early 2019 to replace the 7.62×51mm NATO round in semi-automatic sniper rifles. Tests determined that compared to the 7.62×51mm NATO (M118LR long-range 7.62×51mm NATO load), the 6.5mm Creedmoor doubles hit probability at 1,000 m (1,094 yd), increases effective range by nearly half, reduces wind drift by a third, and has less recoil. The same rifles can use the new cartridge, as their similar dimensions allow the same magazines to be used and the weapon only requires a barrel change.

== Cartridge dimensions ==
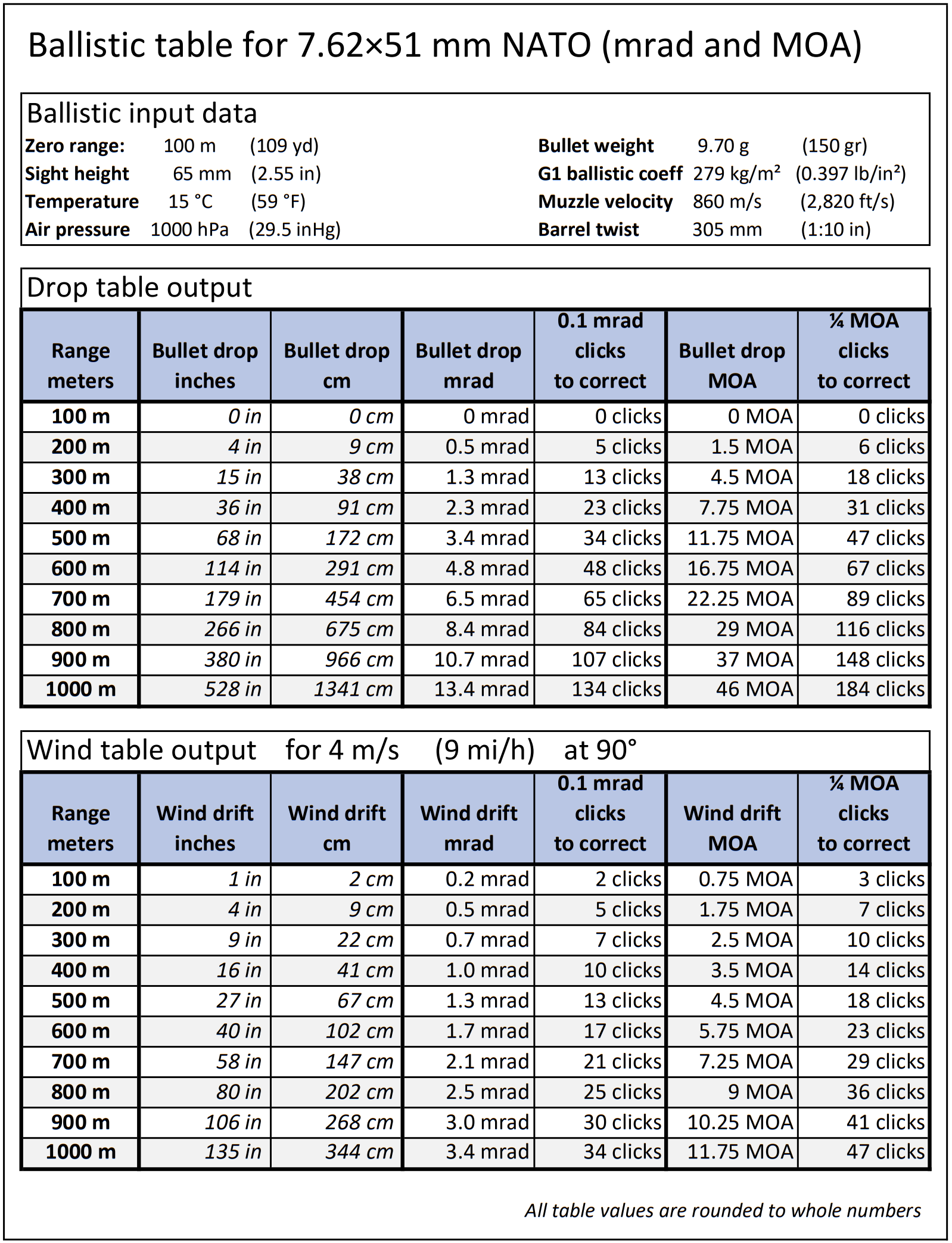
Example of a ballistic table for a given 7.62×51mm NATO load. Bullet drop and wind drift are shown both in mil and moa.

The 7.62×51mm NATO has a 3.38 mL (52.0 gr H_{2}O) cartridge case capacity. The exterior shape of the case was designed to promote reliable case feeding and extraction in bolt-action rifles and machine guns alike, under extreme conditions.

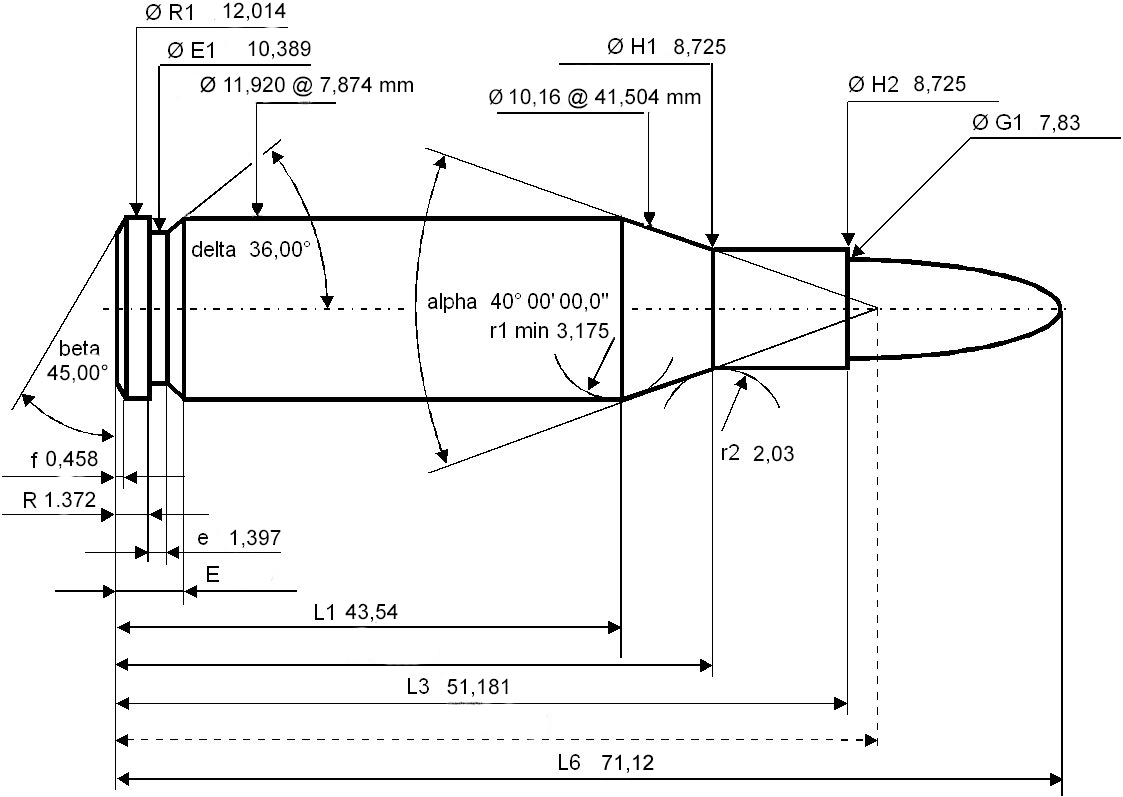

7.62×51mm NATO cartridge dimensions. All dimensions in millimeters (mm).

Americans would define the shoulder angle at alpha/2 = 20 degrees. The common rifling twist rate for this cartridge is 305 mm (1 in 12 in), 4 grooves, Ø lands = 7.62 mm, Ø grooves = 7.82 mm, land width = 4.47 mm. The primer type can be Berdan or Boxer Large Rifle. U.S. Army Research Laboratory (ARL) research papers on the influence of Berdan and Boxer primer spit-hole diameter on 7.62-mm cartridge performance concluded the primary advantage of a Berdan primer is that they are less expensive than a Boxer primer due to their reduced complexity. The ARL found little variation in the pressure-time curves across the different spit-hole configurations. Doubling the area of the spit-hole or incorporating a Berdan-style spit-hole with the same total area as a standard M80 round showed minimal effects on the overall performance. The standard Boxer primed M80 showed the best results. All measured differences are within one standard deviation and are not significant.

According to the official NATO EPVAT NAAG-LG/3-SG/1 rulings, the 7.62×51mm NATO can handle up to 415.00 MPa (60,191 psi) P_{max} piezo pressure. The proof round pressure requirement is 521.30 MPa (75,608 psi) piezo pressure recorded in a NATO design EPVAT barrel with a Kistler 6215 transducer, HPI GP6 transducer, or by equipment to C.I.P. requirements.

The 7.62×51mm NATO cartridge approaches the ballistic performance of the original U.S. military .30-06 Springfield M1906 service cartridge. Modern propellants enabled similar performance in a smaller case with less case capacity, one that requires less brass and yields a shorter cartridge. This shorter cartridge allows a slight reduction in the size and weight of firearms that chamber it, and better cycling in automatic and semi-automatic rifles. The .30-06 Springfield M1906 round weighed 26.1 grams (403 gr), and the 7.62×51mm NATO M80 round weighs 25.4 grams (392 gr).

== 7.62×51mm NATO vs. .308 Winchester ==
Although originating from an identical preceding series of experimental cartridges, the commercial 1952 .308 Winchester and the military 1954 7.62×51mm NATO chamberings have evolved separately but remain similar enough that they can be loaded into rifles chambered for the other round. Still, the .308 Winchester cartridges are typically loaded to higher pressures than 7.62×51mm NATO service cartridges. Even though the Sporting Arms and Ammunition Manufacturers' Institute (SAAMI) does not consider it unsafe to fire the commercial .308 Winchester rounds in weapons chambered for the military 7.62×51mm NATO round, there is significant discussion about compatible chambers and muzzle pressures between the two cartridges based on powder loads, chamber dimensions and wall thicknesses; and head space gauges for the two chamberings differ.

== Military cartridge types ==
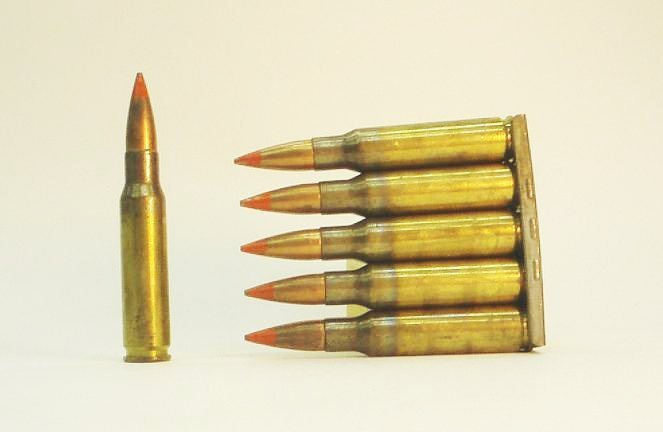
7.62mm, NATO, orange-tipped tracer ammunition, M62: 142-grain (9.2 g) tracer cartridge

=== Australia ===
Current unlinked ammunition is supplied in M19A1 boxes containing 200 rounds divided across four bandoliers containing five-round charger clips or 300 rounds divided across eight cartons. Linked ammunition has been primarily supplied in M19A1 boxes containing one 200-round belt each; the belt can consist either of ball rounds only or of a sequence of four ball rounds followed by one tracer. Historically, both linked and unlinked rounds have also been supplied in wooden boxes containing 500 rounds in bandoliers.

- Round, 7.62mm Ball, L2A2
- Cartridge, 7.62mm Ball, M80: Vietnam War-era, presumably from US stockpiles.
- Cartridge, 7.62mm Ball, F4: 144-grain (9.3 g) M80 equivalent. In service with the Australian Defence Force as cartoned rifle ammunition and linked machine gun ammunition.
- Cartridge, 7.62mm Tracer, M62: Vietnam War-era, presumably from US stockpiles.
- Cartridge, 7.62mm Tracer, F62: M62 equivalent. In service with the Australian Defence Force as linked machine gun ammunition.
- Cartridge, 7.62mm Blank, F6

=== Belgium ===
- SS77/1 (Ball): Designed by FN Herstal and adopted in 1957 by NATO. The Projectile weights 9.3-gram (143.5 gr), perforates a 3.5mm (NATO) mild steel plate at ≥ 550m and has a velocity at 25 metres (82 ft) of ± 833.5 metres per second (2,735 ft/s).
- L78 (Tracer): Designed by FN Herstal. The Projectile weights 8.9-gram (137.3 gr), does not perforate a 3.5 mm (NATO) mild steel plate and has a velocity at 25 metres (82 ft) of ± 828 metres per second (2,720 ft/s), orange projectile tip.
- P80/1 (Armor Piercing): Designed by FN Herstal. The Projectile weights 9.8-gram (151.2 gr), perforates a 3.5mm (NATO) mild steel plate at ≥ 1100 m and has a velocity at 25 metres (82 ft) of ± 823 metres per second (2,700 ft/s), black projectile tip. The round is used in ballistic tests for the TR and VPAM body armor standards.
- Blank: Designed by FN Herstal.

=== Canada ===
- C21 (Ball): The projectile weights 9.5-gram (146.6 gr) and has a muzzle velocity of ± 845 metres per second (2,772 ft/s). Produced by General Dynamics Ordnance and Tactical Systems – Canada.
- C19 (Tracer): The projectile weights 9.3-gram (143.5 gr) and has a muzzle velocity of ± 815 metres per second (2,674 ft/s) and produces from at least 13 metres (14 yd) a minimum 750 metres (820 yd) long red coloured trace. Produced by General Dynamics Ordnance and Tactical Systems – Canada.
- C24 (Blank): Produced by General Dynamics Ordnance and Tactical Systems – Canada.
- C175 (Sniper): The Sierra HPBT projectile weights 168-grain (10.9 g) and has a muzzle velocity of ± 780 metres per second (2,559 ft/s). Produced by General Dynamics Ordnance and Tactical Systems – Canada.
- C181 (Sniper): The Sierra HPBT projectile weights 175-grain (11.3 g) and has a muzzle velocity of ± 800 metres per second (2,625 ft/s). Produced by General Dynamics Ordnance and Tactical Systems – Canada.

=== China ===
- CS/DFL3 used with CS/LR4 sniper rifle
- DJP-201 used with QJY-201 general purpose machine gun
- DBU-203 used with QBU-203 sniper rifle

=== Germany ===
- Patrone AB22, 7.62mm × 51, DM41, Weichkern ("soft-core", or "ball"), (West Germany): 7.62×51mm NATO ball cartridge; Berdan primed, copper-washed steel jacket. German equivalent to the U.S. 7.62×51mm M80 round. Standard service round for the G3 battle rifle. Known for severe fragmentation in human tissue due to its thin jacket, particularly around the cannelure. It has a 3,800-metre (4,156 yd) long dangerous space when fired between a 5° and 10° angle.
- Patrone AB22, 7.62mm × 51, DM111, Weichkern: 147-grain (9.5 g) 7.62×51mm NATO ball cartridge, cupronickel-coated steel jacket. German equivalent to the U.S. M80 round. In service with the German military. It has a 4,200-metre (4,593 yd) long dangerous space when fired between a 5° and 10° angle.
- Patrone, 7.62mm × 51, DM111A1: Further development of the DM111. Retained "green" primer in place of lead acid primer and lead core capped with closure disc. Instead of a steel jacket with gilding metal plating, the DM111A1 has a gilding metal jacket. Fragments in soft tissue, sometimes including the closure disc, separate from the projectile base.
- Patrone, 7.62mm × 51, DM111A2: Further low pollutant development of the DM111A1.
- Patrone, 7.62mm × 51, DM151, Hartkern ("hard-core", or "armor-piercing):151-grain (9.8 g) 7.62×51mm NATO armor-piercing cartridge, tungsten carbide core, cupronickel-coated steel jacket. In service with the German military. It has a 4,300-metre (4,703 yd) long dangerous space when fired between a 5° and 10° angle.
- Patrone AM31, 7.62mm × 51, DM28A2, Manöver ("maneuver"): Blanks, olive colored plastic with a brass base
- Patrone AM32, 7.62mm × 51, DM18A1B1, Übung ("practice"): 10-grain (0.6 g) 7.62×51mm NATO plastic training cartridge, plastic case cartridge colored light blue with a light 10-grain plastic bullet which is fired with a high initial velocity. Non-corrosive, steel base with lead-free primer. Developed from the Norwegian NM8 and NM127 short-range practice rounds made by Bakelittfabrikken. Non-reloadable due to the plastic case.

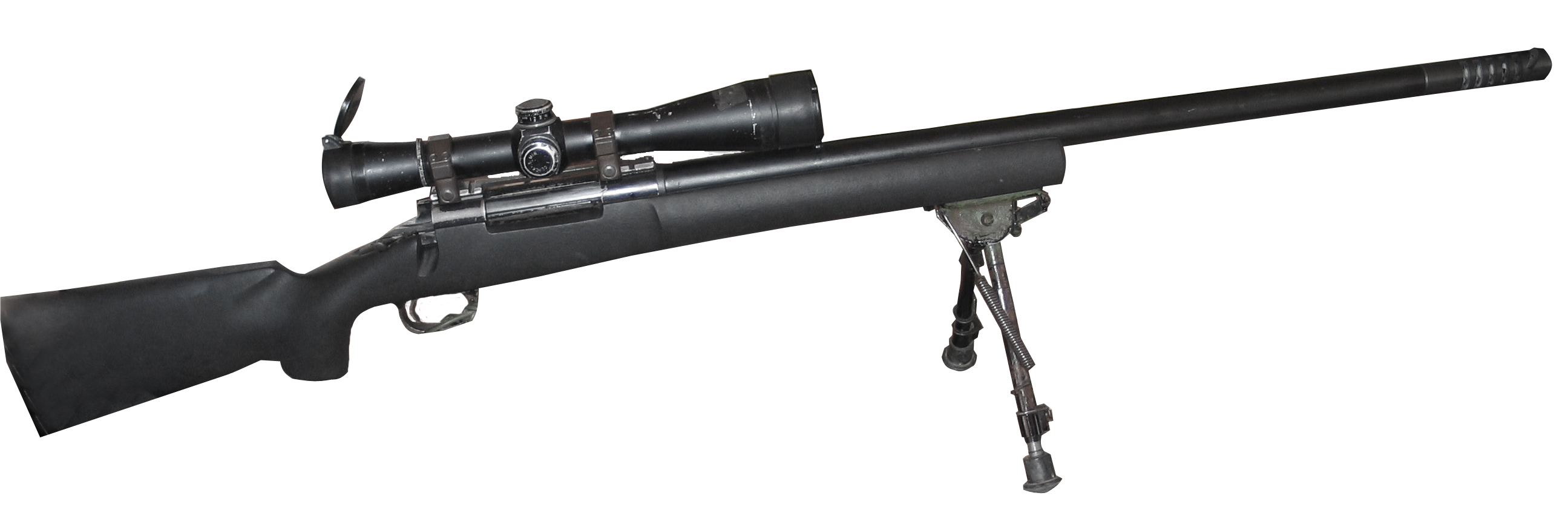
The IMI 7.62×51mm long range match was optimized for the M24 SWS in use by the Israel Defense Forces. The combined sniper weapon system achieves accuracy of 0.5 minute of angle.

=== Israel ===
- IMI, 7.62mm × 51mm, long range match 175 gr: 175-grain (11.3 g) 7.62×51mm NATO Match-grade round specifically designed for long-range sniping and optimized for the Israel Defense Forces sniper rifles, mainly the M24 SWS. It uses a 175-grain (11.3 g) Match King OTM-BT. An IDF M24 SWS with this round achieves accuracy of 0.5 MOA. Produced at IMI Systems "Izhak" Ammunition Plant in Israel.

=== Norway ===
- NM258: 10.9 g (168 grain) 7.62 mm x 51 Ball 11 Long Range bullet. Military specified (STANAG 2310) cartridge with a full metal jacket projectile, specifically designed for DMR, sniper rifles, and machine guns. The increased weight increases the impact energy by 40 percent at 800 m compared to a standard M80. Produced by Nammo.

=== South Africa ===
Packaging configurations for all ammunition natures c. 2010 consisted of a plastic 8217 box containing 1,260 rounds, divided across nine PVC bags of seven twenty-round cartons each, and a conventional M2A1 box containing 400 rounds, divided across twenty cartons of twenty rounds each. For linked ammunition, configurations consisted of a plastic 7716 box containing 1,000 linked rounds divided across five plastic 7815 cases of one 200-round belt each and a wire-bound wooden box containing either 1,000 linked rounds divided across four steel M61 boxes containing one 250-round belt each or 800 linked rounds divided across four steel H84 boxes containing one 200-round belt each. Link types used included M13, M2A2 Browning, and Vickers.

- Cartridge, 7.62×51mm, Ball: SS77/1 equivalent assembled by the South African Mint from imported Belgian components.
- Cartridge, 7.62×51mm, Tracer: L78 equivalent assembled by the South African Mint from imported Belgian components.
- Cartridge, 7.62×51mm, Ball, Mk. 1/A1: Ball round produced by the South African Mint from 1961 to 1965 and by Pretoria Metal Pressings (currently a division of Denel) from 1965 to 1972. Rounds produced after 1968 were redesignated as "A1".
- Cartridge, 7.62×51mm, Drill, Mk. 1/A1: Drill round produced by the South African Mint from 1964 to 1965 and by Pretoria Metal Pressings from 1965 to 1972. Rounds produced after 1968 were redesignated as "A1".
- Cartridge, 7.62×51mm, Blank, Mk. 1/A1: Blank cartridge produced by Pretoria Metal Pressings from 1967 to 1972. Rounds produced after 1968 were redesignated as "A1".
- Cartridge, 7.62×51mm, Proof: Proof round produced by Pretoria Metal Pressings from 1967 to 1972. Rounds produced until 1970 had a green tip, with subsequent rounds a honey-coloured tip; the last rounds produced had honey-coloured colouring on the base as well. A warmer round variation exists with purple colouring on the tip, base, or both.
- Cartridge, 7.62×51mm, Tracer, G.A1: Tracer round produced by Pretoria Metal Pressings from 1968 to 1972.
- Cartridge, 7.62×51mm, Practice, A1 P: Short-range practice round with a plastic bullet produced by Pretoria Metal Pressings from 1970 to 1972. While both blue and orange versions were produced, only the latter was officially adopted.
- Round, 7.62×51mm, Ball, R1M1: M59 equivalent produced by Pretoria Metal Pressings from 1973 to 1982.
- Round, 7.62×51mm, Tracer, G.R1M1: Tracer round produced by Pretoria Metal Pressings from 1973 to 1982.
- Cartridge, 7.62×51mm, Blank, L.R1M1/M2: Blank cartridge produced by Pretoria Metal Pressings from 1973 to 1982. Only 1973 rounds were produced to the M1 standard (straight three-lobe petal crimp), with all subsequent production being to the M2 standard (slightly twisted three-lobe petal crimp).
- Cartridge, 7.62×51mm, H.R1M1/M2: Grenade-launching cartridge produced by Pretoria Metal Pressings from 1973 to 1982. Versions were produced for use with 75mm and 103mm rifle grenades.
- Round, 7.62×51mm, Proof, R1M1: Proof round produced by Pretoria Metal Pressings from 1974 to 1982. Rounds had a honey-coloured base and tip until 1980 (black base on 1980 rounds, yellow base and tip on 1981 rounds). A warmer round variation exists with purple colouring on the base only.
- Round, 7.62×51mm, Drill, R1M1/M2: Drill round produced by Pretoria Metal Pressings from 1973 to 1982.
- Round, 7.62×51mm, Practice, R1M1: Short-range practice round with an orange plastic bullet produced by Pretoria Metal Pressings from 1973 to 1982. Some rounds produced after 1981 used black or white bullets.
- Round, 7.62×51mm, Ball, M1A1-A5: M80 equivalent produced by Pretoria Metal Pressings from 1983 onwards.
- Round, 7.62×51mm, Tracer, M2A1-A5: M62 equivalent produced by Pretoria Metal Pressings from 1983 onwards.
- Cartridge, 7.62×51mm, Blank, M4A2/A3/A4: M82 equivalent produced by Pretoria Metal Pressings from 1983 onwards.
- Cartridge, 7.62×51mm, Grenade Launcher, M5A1/A2/A3: Grenade-launching cartridge produced by Pretoria Metal Pressings from 1983 onwards.
- Round, 7.62×51mm, Plastic Ball, M11A1/A2: Short-range practice round with a black plastic bullet produced by Pretoria Metal Pressings from 1983 onwards.
- Round, 7.62×51mm, Proof (High Pressure), M13A1/A2/A3: Proof round produced by Pretoria Metal Pressings from 1983 onwards. Rounds have yellow colouring on the base, tip, or both.
- Round, 7.62×51mm, Drill, M14A1/A2: Drill round produced by Pretoria Metal Pressings from 1983 onwards.
- Round, 7.62×51mm, Ball, M80: M80 equivalent produced by Pretoria Metal Pressings for export sales.
- Round, 7.62×51mm, Tracer, M62: M62 equivalent produced by Pretoria Metal Pressings for export sales.
- Cartridge, 7.62×51mm, Blank, M82: M82 equivalent produced by Pretoria Metal Pressings for export sales.

=== United Kingdom ===
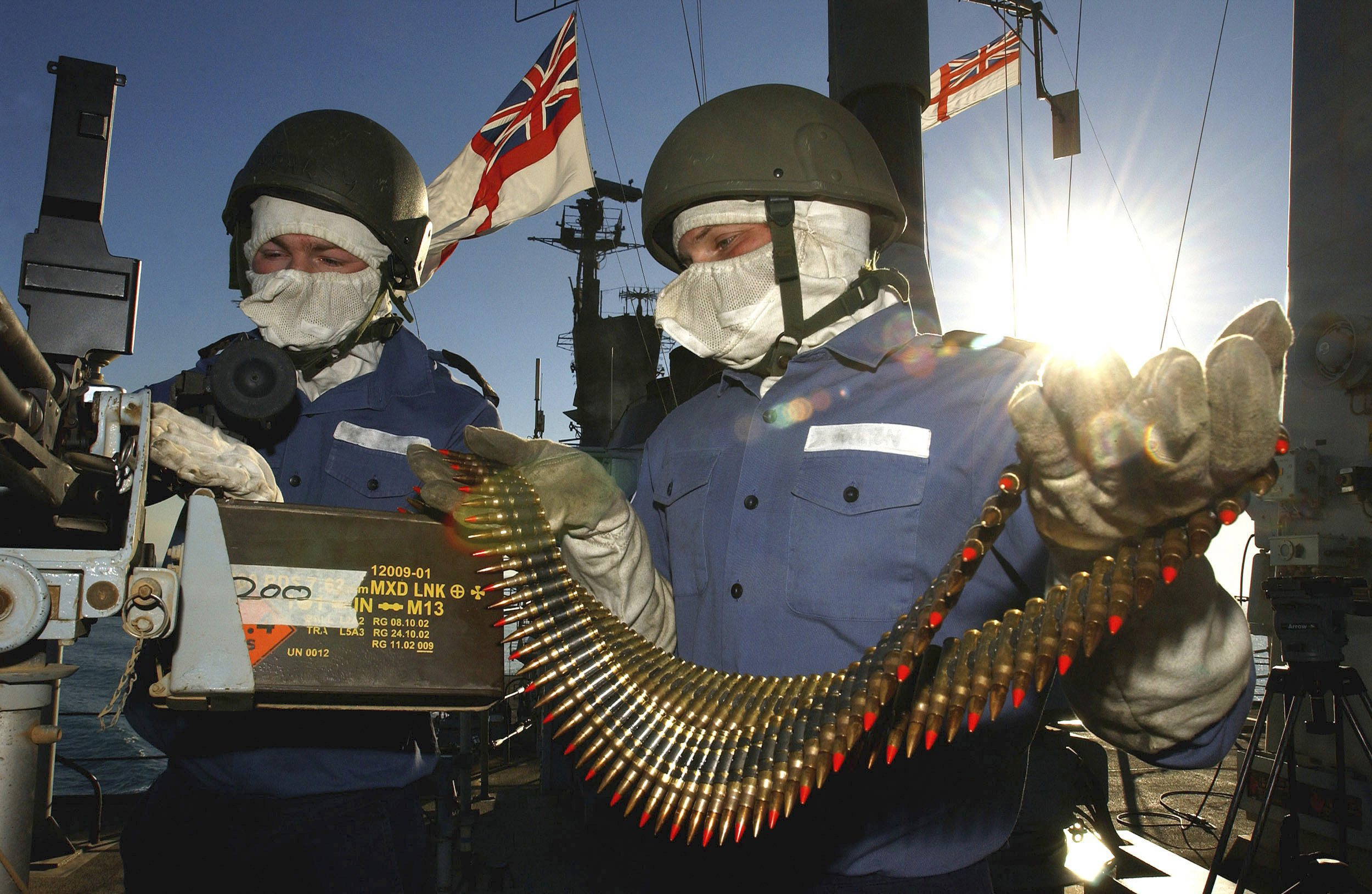
Royal Navy sailor handling a 200-round belt of L2A2 Ball and L5A3 Tracer ammunition during Operation Telic.

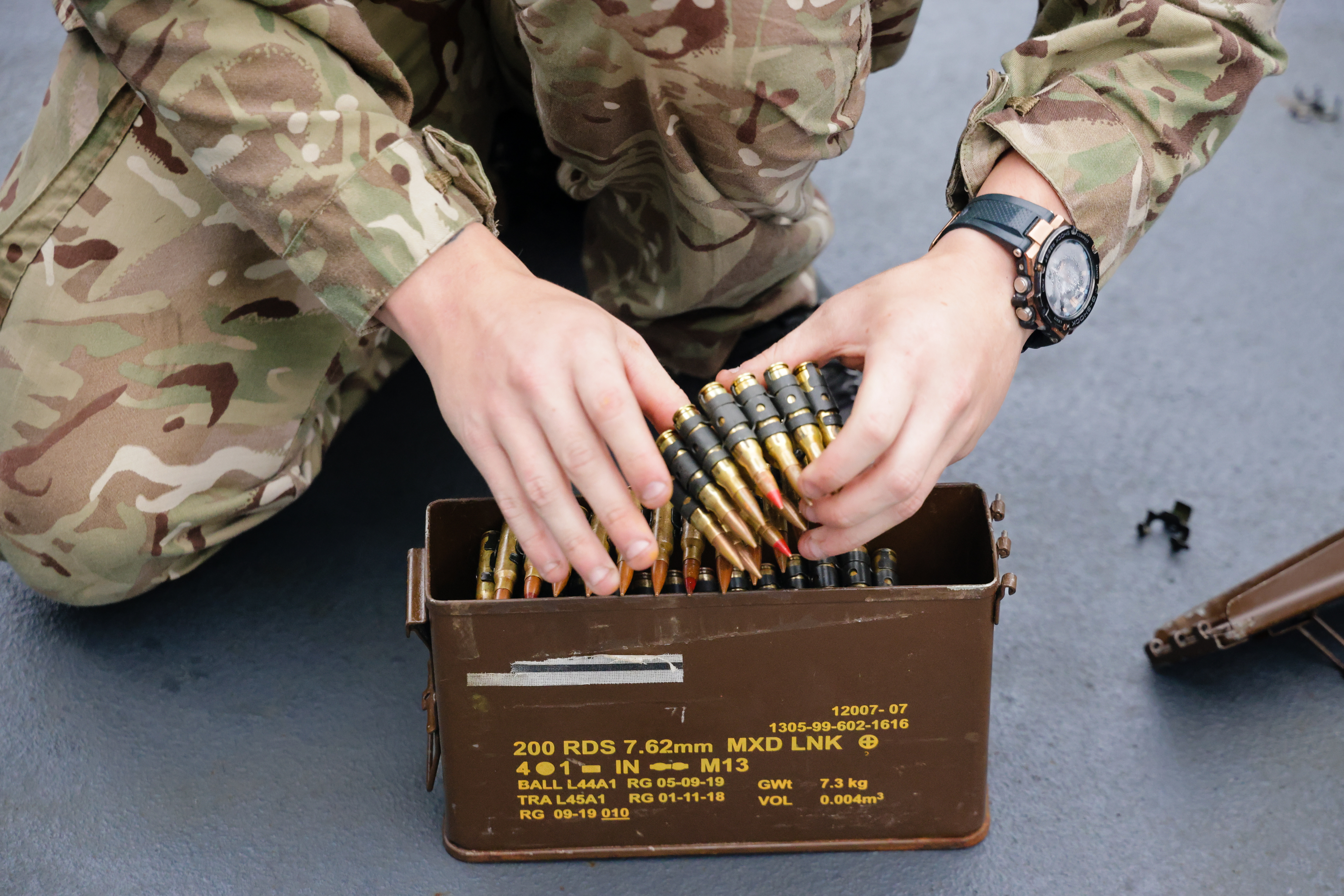
Royal Navy sailor handling a 200-round belt of L44A1 Ball and L45A1 Tracer ammunition in 2022.

Much like the .303 ammunition it succeeded, initial batches of British 7.62mm unlinked ammunition were packed in steel H50 boxes, each containing two wooden H51 boxes; each H51 box stored the ammunition in a further H52 metal lining. Packaging quantities included 700 rounds in bandoliers containing five-round charger clips (350 rounds per H51), 600 rounds in thirty-round cartons (300 rounds per H51), and 576 rounds in cartons containing thirty-two rounds (288 rounds per H51). Alternatively, ammunition could be provided in a wooden box containing two metal boxes that were similar but not identical to the H52; these wooden boxes used the same packaging quantities as their H50 counterparts. Starting c. 1969, ammunition began to be packed in H84 boxes instead, with this arrangement continuing to the present day; packaging quantities include or included 450 rounds in bandoliers containing five-round charger clips, 400 rounds in twenty-round cartons or fifty-round plastic containers, and 560 rounds in twenty-round cartons. Linked ammunition has been consistently packed in H82 boxes containing one 200-round belt each, with such boxes appearing as early as c. 1964; this belt can consist purely of one ammunition nature, but more commonly it consists of a sequence of four ball rounds followed by one tracer round or, more rarely, one ball round followed by one tracer round. Unless stated otherwise, all ammunition listed below is or was manufactured by Radway Green and by Kynoch. Radway Green, which is currently owned by BAE Systems, continues to produce ammunition for the Ministry of Defence and export customers.

- Round, 7.62mm Ball, L2A1-A4: 144-grain (9.3 g) ball round. The L2A2 and later rounds feature a thicker, stronger case head to prevent its separation when fired from the L4 light machine gun. In addition to manufacture by Radway Green and by Kynoch, a batch was produced by Greenwood & Batley which failed to pass proof in its entirety. L2 rounds and their L5 tracer counterparts appear to have been produced as late as 2002.
- Round, 7.62mm Ball, L11A1: Manufactured by Raufoss
- Round, 7.62mm Ball, L16A1: Manufactured by Raufoss
- Round, 7.62mm Ball, L37A1: Manufactured by FNM
- Round, 7.62mm Ball, L38A1
- Round, 7.62mm Ball, L40A1: Semi-armour-piercing, no known orders despite type classification
- Round, 7.62mm Ball, Sniper, L42A1-A3: 155-grain (10.0 g) sniper-grade ball round manufactured to tighter standards
- Round, 7.62mm Ball, L44A1: 144-grain (9.3 g) ball round
- Round, 7.62mm Ball, L46A1: Manufactured by CBC
- Round, 7.62mm Ball, L59A1/A2: 155-grain (10.0 g) "High Performance" ball round with a hardened steel tip
- Round, 7.62mm Tracer, L5A1-A5: Tracer round complement to L2, designed to last out to 1,000 metres (1,100 yd). Four subvariants exist, with brighter ignition (A2), tracer reduced to 750 metres (820 yd) (A3), with a pistol powder charge (A4), and with improved ballistics (A5).
- Round, 7.62mm Tracer, L45A1: Tracer round complement to L44A1
- Round, 7.62mm Tracer, L47A1: Tracer round complement to L46A1 manufactured by CBC
- Round, 7.62mm Proof, L4A1: Copper-washed proof round. Rounds produced after 1981 featured bases with a milled edge.
- Cartridge, 7.62mm Rifle Grenade, L1A1/A2: For use with the Energa grenade. The lower half of the cartridge was chemically blackened.
- Cartridge, 7.62mm Blank, L10A1/A2: Blank training round complement to L2. A1 production was undertaken by FN Herstal, while A2 production was undertaken by Radway Green.
- Cartridge, 7.62mm Blank, L13A1-A4: Blank training round complement to L2
- Cartridge, 7.62mm Blank, L14A1: Manufactured by Metallwerk Elisenhütte (MEN)
- Cartridge, 7.62mm Blank, L31A1: Manufactured by Hirtenberger Patronen
- Cartridge, 7.62mm Blank, L43A1: Blank training round complement to L44A1
- Round, 7.62mm Drill, L1A1/A2

=== United States ===
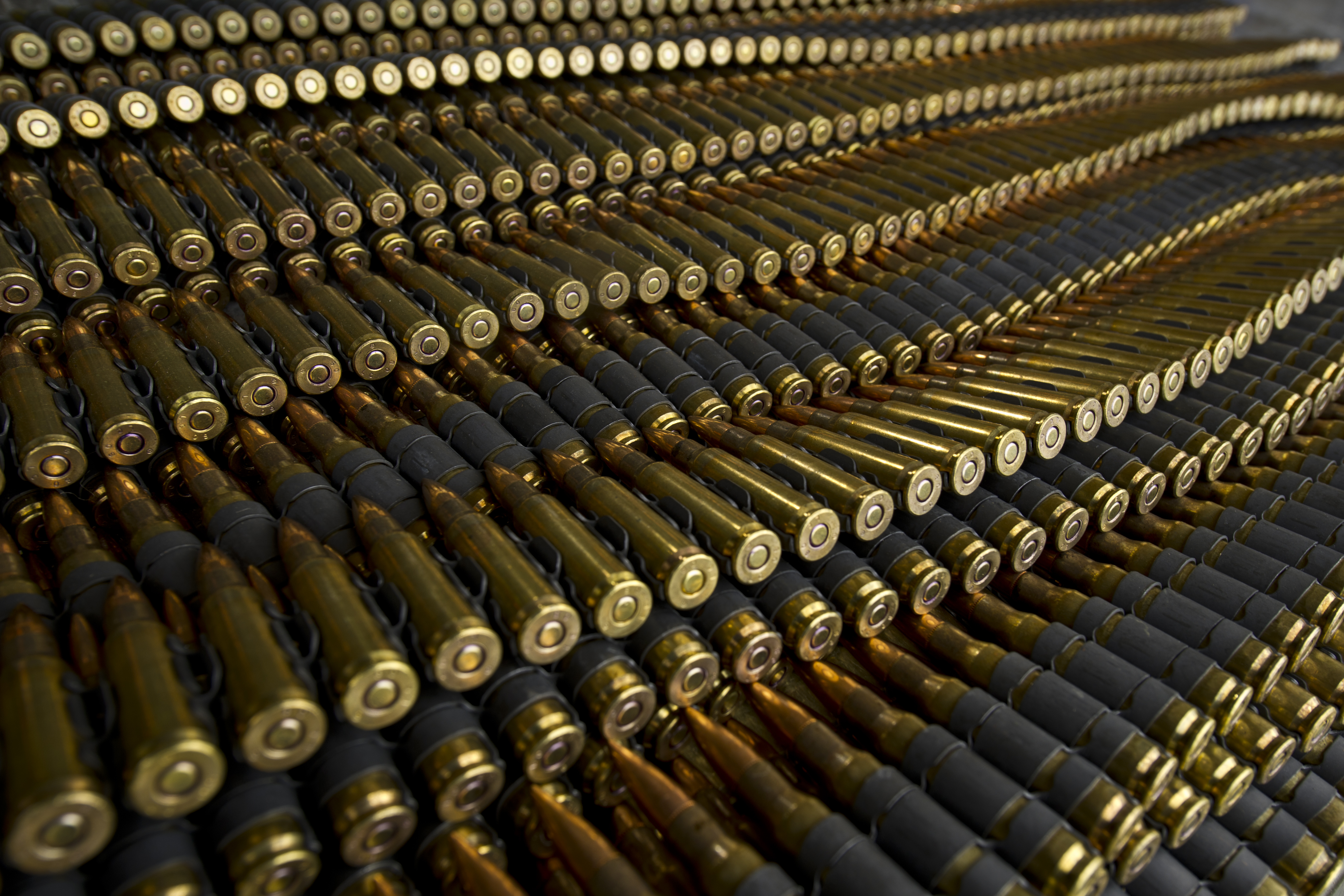
Linked belts of Lake City M80 Ball ammunition

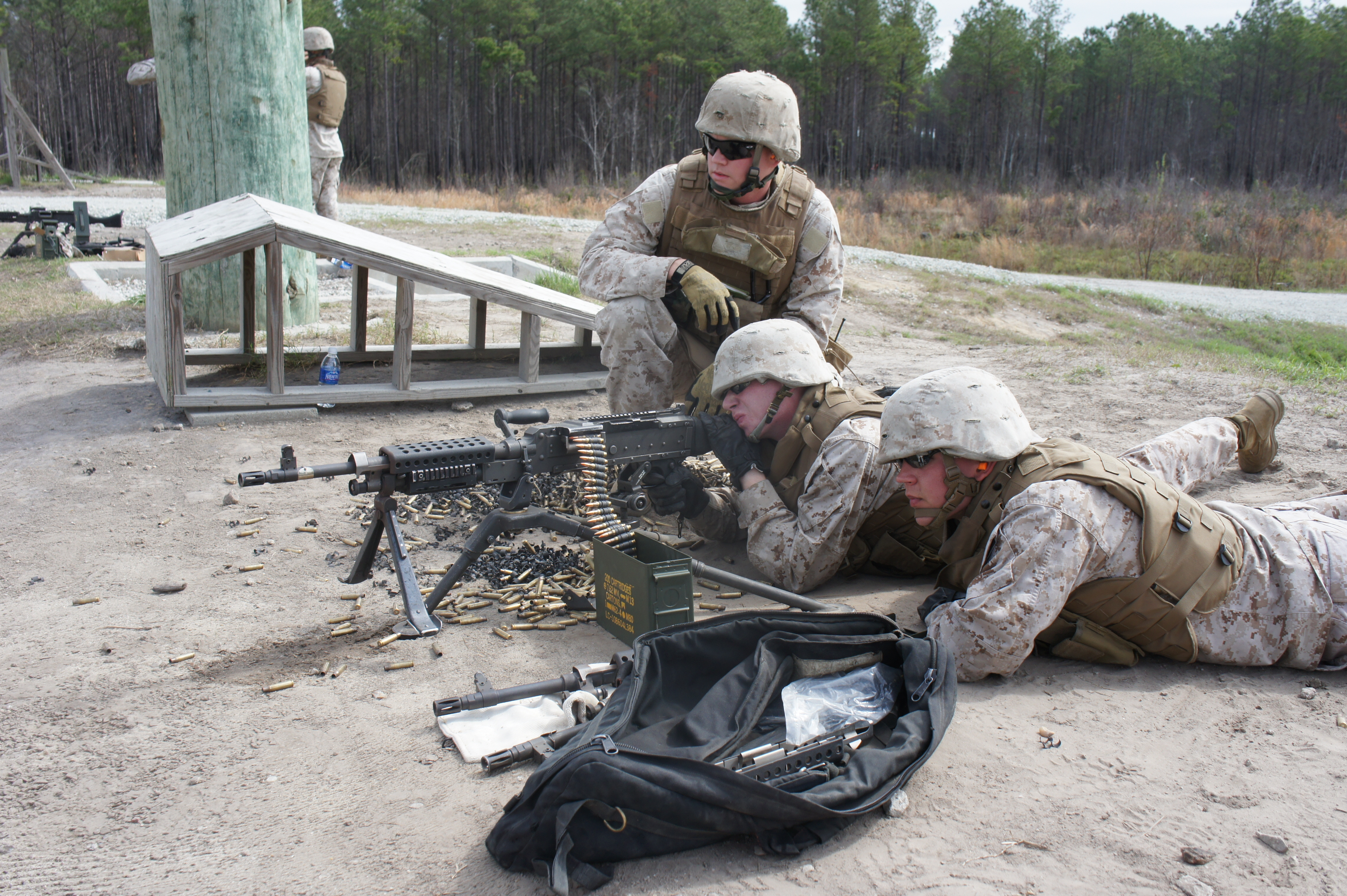
Marine Corps M240 machine gun with a belt of M80 Ball and M62 Tracer ammunition.

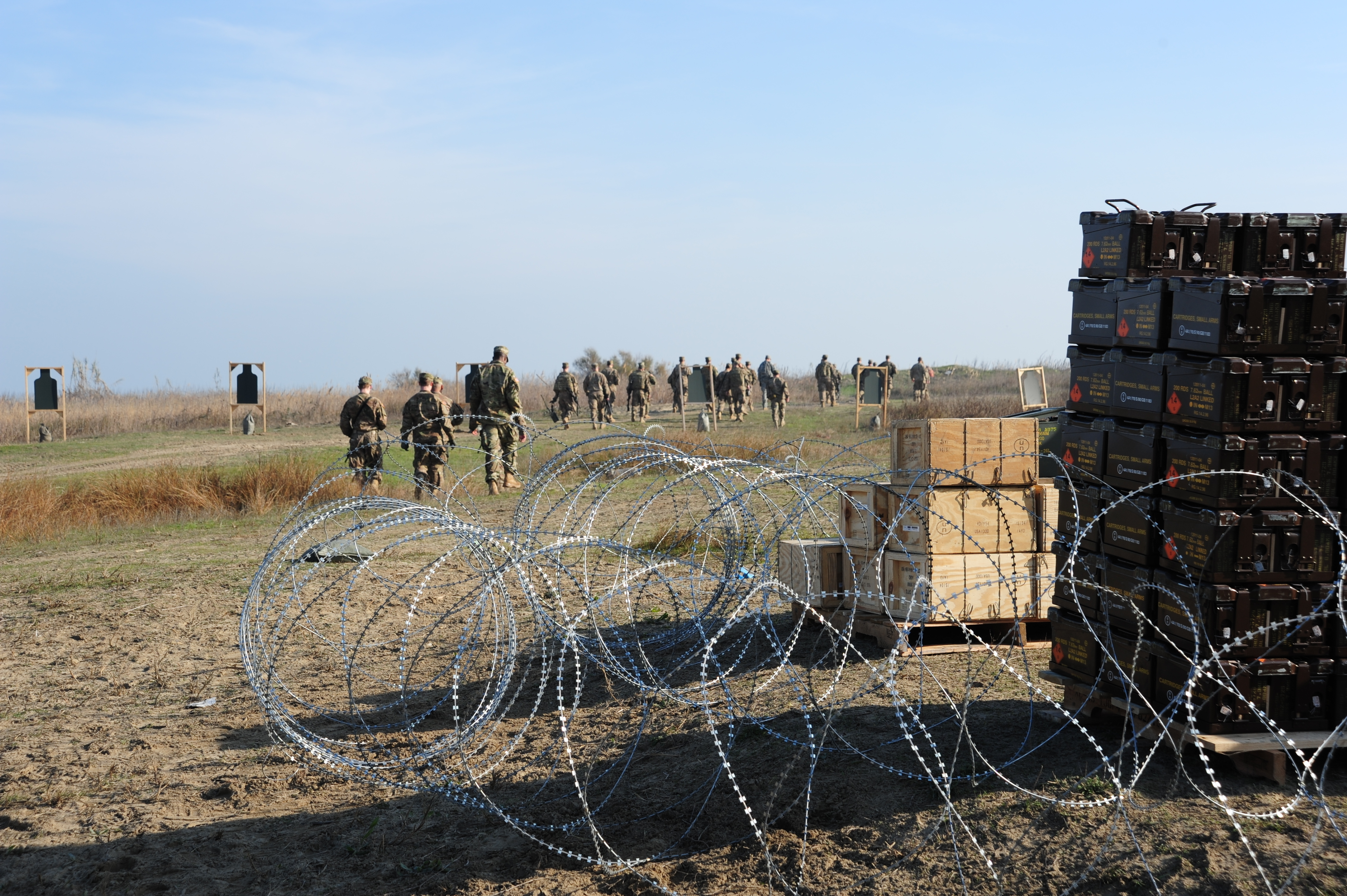
British L2A2 Ball ammunition being used by US troops for live firing training.

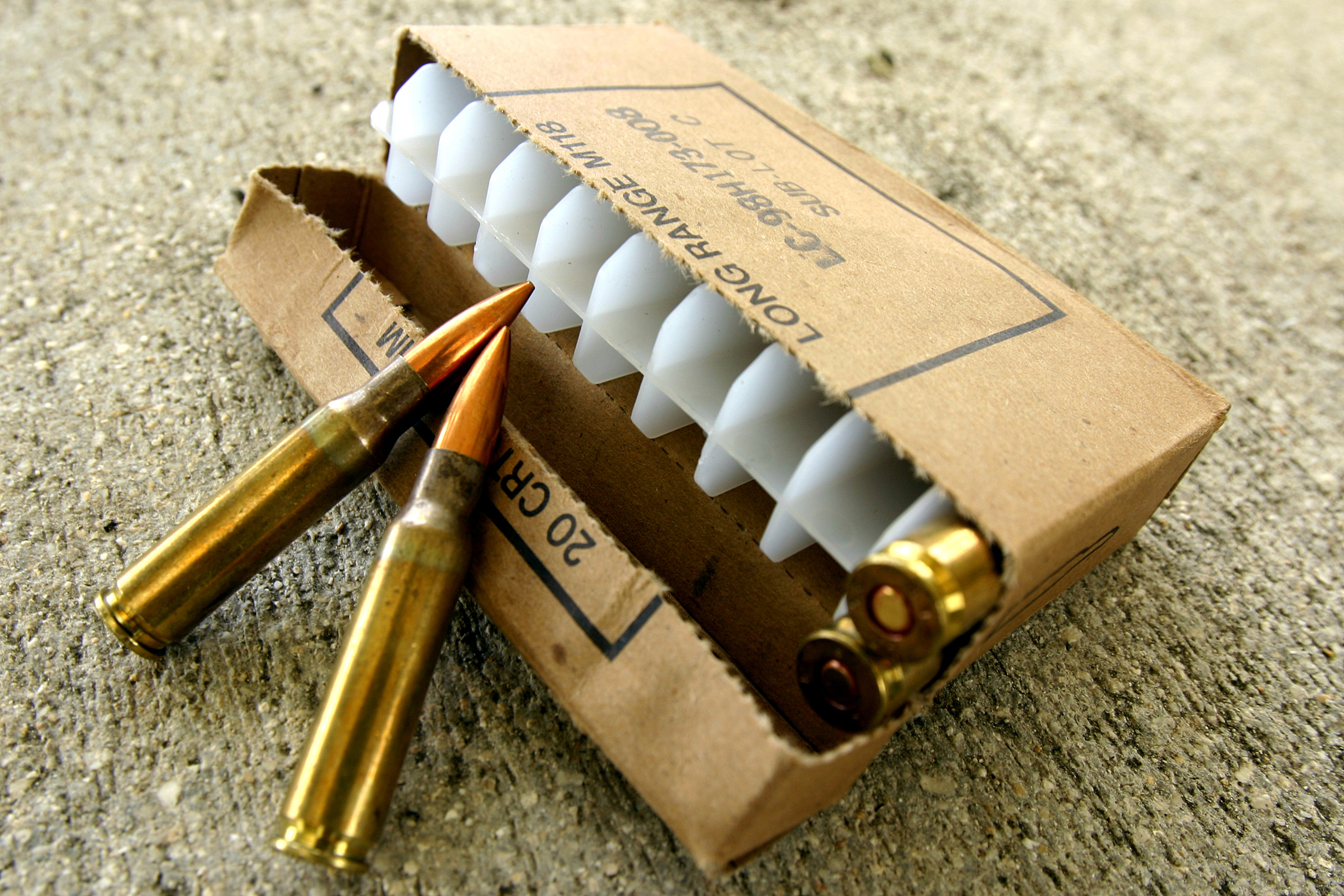
The 7.62mm M118 long range cartridge

- Cartridge, caliber 7.62mm, NATO, ball, M59: 150.5-grain (9.8 g) 7.62×51mm NATO ball cartridge. A further development of the initial T65 cartridge. It has a long, heavy bullet with a semi-armor-piercing iron or mild-steel core and a gilded-steel jacket. After the Vietnam War, it was replaced by the M80 ball cartridge as the standard round. Data contained in TM 9-1005-298-12 mentions the approximate maximum range of 3,820-metre (4,180 yd) at 856.2-metre-per-second (2,809 ft/s) muzzle velocity.
- Cartridge, caliber 7.62mm, NATO, high pressure test, M60: 7.62×51mm NATO test cartridge. The cartridge is not for field issue, but is used for proof firing of weapons during manufacture, test, or repair. A stannic-stained (silvered) case identifies the cartridge.
- Cartridge, caliber 7.62mm, NATO, armor piercing, M61: 150.5-grain (9.8 g) 7.62×51mm NATO armor-piercing round, black cartridge tip. Data contained in TM 9-1005-298-12 mentions an approximate maximum range of 3,820-metre (4,180 yd) at 854.6-metre-per-second (2,804 ft/s) muzzle velocity.
- Cartridge, caliber 7.62mm, NATO, tracer, M62: 142-grain (9.2 g) tracer cartridge, orange cartridge tip. Data contained in TM 9-1005-298-12 mentions an approximate maximum range of 2,340-metre (2,560 yd) at 856.2-metre-per-second (2,809 ft/s) muzzle velocity.
- Cartridge, caliber 7.62mm, NATO, dummy, M63: The cartridge is used for practice in loading 7.62mm weapons for simulated firing to detect flinching of personnel during firing and for inspecting and testing the weapon mechanism. The cartridge is identified by six longitudinal corrugations (flutings) on the cartridge case. There is no primer and no vent hole in the primer pocket.
- Cartridge, caliber 7.62mm, NATO, grenade, M64: 7.62×51mm NATO grenade launching blank. The cartridge is identified by a rose-petal (rosette-crimp) closure of the cartridge case mouth and sealed with red lacquer. The cartridge provides pressure upon firing to project a rifle grenade to a desired target when using a grenade projectile adapter and a dragon missile launch effect trainer (LET).
- Cartridge, caliber 7.62mm, NATO, ball, M80: 147-grain (9.5 g) 7.62×51mm NATO ball cartridge. The U.S. Army's Ballistic Research Laboratory measured a ballistic coefficient (G7 BC) of 0.200 and form factor (G7 i) of 1.105 for the M80 ball projectile. Another source mentions a slightly higher ballistic coefficient (G7 BC) of 0.209. Data contained in TM 9-1005-298-12 mentions the approximate maximum range of 3,930-metre (4,300 yd) at 856.2-metre-per-second (2,809 ft/s) muzzle velocity.
- Cartridge, caliber 7.62mm, NATO, ball, enhanced projectile round, M80A1: 130-grain (8.4 g) M80 lead free (LF) 7.62×51mm NATO ball cartridge. 114.5-grain (7.4 g) of lead eliminated per M80A1 projectile.
- Cartridge, caliber 7.62mm, NATO, blank, M82: 7.62×51mm NATO cartridge is used in rifles and machine guns equipped with blank firing attachments to simulate firing in training exercises and for performing military honors. The cartridge is identified by its double-tapered (bottle-nose) neck and absence of a bullet.
- Cartridge, caliber 7.62mm, NATO, ball, silent, XM115: Little is known of this round, but it was an attempt to quiet the round. Never adopted.
- Cartridge, caliber 7.62mm, NATO, match, M118: 173-grain (11.2 g) 7.62×51mm NATO full metal jacket boat-tail round specifically designed for Match purposes. The round was introduced as the XM118 match in 1963 and was produced at both Frankford Arsenal and Lake City Army Ammunition Plant. It was standardized as the M118 match in mid-1965. It used the same bullet as the .30-06 Springfield M72 match ball round, match-grade brass cartridges, and used fitted No. 43 primers. Production ceased at Frankford in 1965 but continued at Lake City until the early 1980s. Lake City used dedicated equipment to produce the ammo up until the mid-1970s, and during that time, the quality of the ammunition was quite good. When they stopped using dedicated machinery, the quality of the ammo declined noticeably.
- Cartridge, caliber 7.62mm, NATO, ball, special, M118: 173-grain (11.2 g) 7.62×51mm NATO full metal jacket boat-tail round specifically designed for match purposes, produced by Lake City Army Ammunition Plant. This is an interim match round which utilized standard M80 ball brass cartridges with the 173-grain (11.2 g) full-metal jacketed ball boat-tailed (FMJBT) bullet and staked No. 34 or No. 36 primers. During this period, in the early to late 1980s, the round's performance declined. Powder, primers, and brass were the same as standard ball rounds; bullets and powder charges varied in weight due to worn machinery and poor quality control. Since it could not be called "match" due to its erratic trajectory, it was renamed "special ball". Snipers used to test shoot batches of ammo, find a batch that shot well (or at least consistently), then zeroed their weapon to that batch and tried to procure as much of that ammo as possible.
- Cartridge, caliber 7.62mm, NATO, ball, special, M118LR: 175-grain (11.3 g) 7.62×51mm NATO match-grade round specifically designed for long-range sniping. It uses a 175-grain (11.3 g) Sierra Match King hollow point boat-tail bullet with a ballistic coefficient (G7 BC) of 0.243. Produced at Lake City Army Ammunition Plant. The propellant's noticeable muzzle flash and temperature sensitivity led to the development of the MK 316 MOD 0 for special operations use.
- Cartridge, caliber 7.62mm, NATO, frangible, M160: 108.5-grain (7.0 g) 7.62×51mm NATO frangible bullet, upon striking a target, disintegrates, leaving a mark at the point of impact.
- Cartridge, caliber 7.62mm, NATO, dummy, M172: 7.62×51mm NATO cartridge is inert and is used to test the mechanism and metallic link belts of 7.62mm weapons. The cartridge is identified by a black oxide finish over the entire round and has no primer. There is no vent hole in the primer pocket.
- Cartridge, caliber 7.62mm, NATO, ball, overhead fire, XM178: 7.62×51mm NATO overhead fire application (OFA) cartridge using a solid turned gilding metal (GM) bullet. These were developed to make the OFA cartridges safer since there would be no small pieces of bullets that could separate and fall on the troops—never adopted.
- Cartridge, caliber 7.62mm, NATO, tracer, overhead fire, XM179: 7.62×51mm NATO overhead fire application (OFA) cartridge using a solid, turned GM bullet. These were developed to make the OFA cartridges safer since there would be no small pieces of bullets that could separate and fall on the troops. The difference between XM179 and XM180 is the amount of trace mixture. Never adopted.
- Cartridge, caliber 7.62mm, NATO, tracer, overhead fire, XM180: 7.62×51mm NATO overhead fire application (OFA) cartridge using a solid, turned GM bullet. These were developed to make the OFA cartridges safer since there would be no small pieces of bullets that could separate and fall on the troops. The difference between XM179 and XM180 is the amount of trace mixture. Never adopted.
- Cartridge, caliber 7.62mm, NATO, blank, XM192: 7.62×51mm short-case rose-crimped blank. Never adopted.
- Cartridge, caliber 7.62mm, NATO, duplex, M198 (green tip): 7.62×51mm NATO duplex ball round with two 84-grain (5.4 g) bullets. The developmental designation was T314E3. It was meant to increase the M14's volume of fire by doubling the number of bullets it could fire per minute. Green cartridge tip.
- Cartridge, caliber 7.62mm, NATO, ball, low recoil, XM256: 7.62×51mm NATO single 82-grain (5.3 g) bullet from M198 round. Another attempt to control the M14 in full-auto mode or for small-stature troops. White cartridge tip. Never adopted.
- Cartridge, caliber 7.62mm, NATO, tracer, M276: 7.62×51mm NATO so-called "dim tracer" with reduced effect primarily for use with night vision devices, violet bullet tip.
- Cartridge, caliber 7.62mm, NATO, match, M852: 168-grain (10.9 g) 7.62×51mm NATO hollow-point boat-tail cartridge, specifically designed for use in national match competitions. It was dubbed "Mexican match" because it was based on the international match loading used at the Pan-Am Games in Mexico. It used standard brass, primer, and propellant, but used a match-grade bullet. It was later approved by the U.S. Army JAG in the 1990s for combat use by snipers. It replaced the M118SB as the standard match round. The bullet was very accurate at around 300 meters (competition match ranges), but suffered at longer ranges.
- Cartridge, caliber 7.62mm, NATO, saboted light armor penetrator, M948: 7.62×51mm NATO saboted light armor penetrator cartridge. Adopted in limited quantities only by the U.S. Army.
- Cartridge, caliber 7.62mm, NATO, saboted light armor penetrator tracer, M959: 7.62×51mm NATO saboted light armor penetrator cartridge with tracer element. Adopted in limited quantities only by the U.S. Army.
- Cartridge, caliber 7.62mm, NATO, ball, training, M973: 7.62×51mm NATO SRTA ball training round. Has an air brake to reduce the range the bullet will fly
- Cartridge, caliber 7.62mm, NATO, tracer, training, M974: 7.62×51mm NATO SRTA tracer training round. Has an air brake to reduce the range the bullet will fly
- Cartridge, caliber 7.62mm, NATO, armor piercing, M993: 128 grains (8.3 g) 7.62×51mm NATO armor-piercing round with a tungsten carbide core, black cartridge tip. Can penetrate 18 mm of RHA at 100 meters. Classified in 1996, solely produced by Nammo.
- Cartridge, caliber 7.62mm, NATO, advanced armor piercing, M1158: 7.62×51mm NATO advanced armor piercing round, black cartridge tip surrounded by copper jacket
- Cartridge, caliber 7.62mm special ball, long range, MK 316 MOD 0: A 175-grain (11.3 g) round specifically designed for long-range sniping consisting of Sierra MatchKing hollow-point boat-tail projectiles, Federal Cartridge Company match cartridge cases, and Gold Medal match primers. The propellant has been verified as IMR 4064 (per NSN 1305-01-567-6944 and Federal Cartridge Company Contract/Order Number N0016408DJN28 and has a charge weight per the specs of 41.745-grain (2.7 g).
- Cartridge, caliber 7.62mm, NATO, ball, barrier, T762TNB1 MK 319 MOD 0: 7.62×51mm NATO enhance behind barrier performance, enhance function, and casualty and muzzle flash requirements in short barrel carbines, 130 grains (8.4 g).

== Department of Defense Identification Codes (DODIC) ==
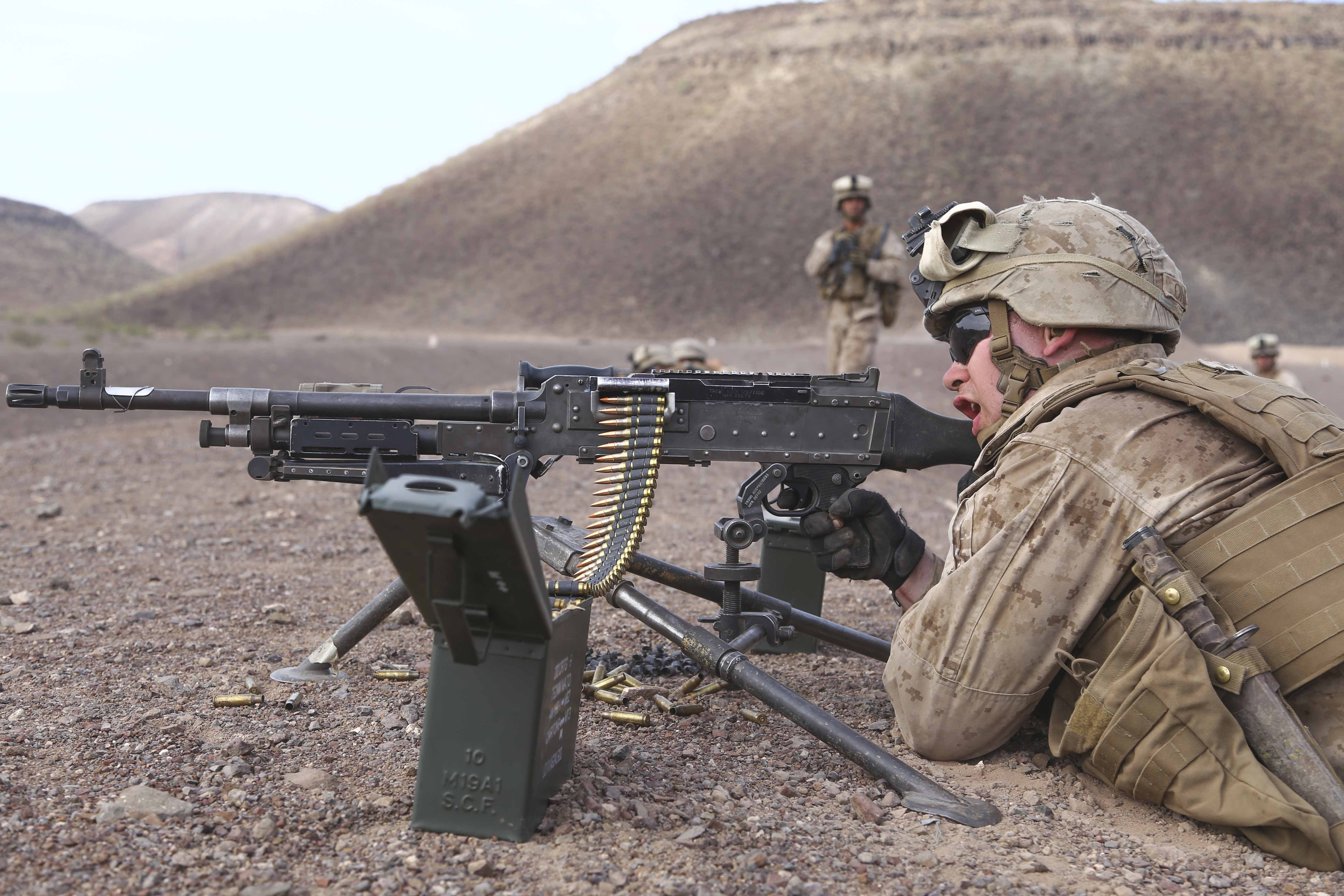
M13 links connect up to 200 7.62×51mm NATO rounds (4 × ball : 1 tracer) contained in an M19A1 ammunition box used to feed a M240G machine gun

The US Armed Forces and NATO use this four-character alphanumeric code to identify the cartridge, the cartridge type, and the packing method (cartons, clips, link belt, or bulk) used.

- A111 (7.62mm blank M82 linked): 100-round M13 linked belt (M82 blank) packed in a cardboard box. There are two boxes per M19A1 ammo can (200 rounds) and four M19A1 ammo cans per wire-bound crate (800 rounds). Used in M60 and M240 general-purpose machine guns for training purposes.
- A159 (7.62mm dummy M172 linked) 100-round M13 linked belt (M172 dummy) packed in a cardboard box. There are two boxes per M19A1 ammo can (200 rounds) and four M19A1 ammo cans per wire-bound crate (800 rounds). The munition is designed to simulate a linked belt of M80 ball ammunition. Used for weapon manufacturing testing to conduct belt-pull tests for automatic weapons and for environmental conditioning tests of weapons, mounts, and ammunition. The M172 linked belt is also used to develop new and/or improved mount systems for vehicles that contain the M240-series machine gun.
- A165 (7.62mm ball/tracer linked): 750-round M13 linked belt (4 × M80 ball : 1 M62 tracer). Used in 7.62 mm miniguns.
- AA11 (7.62mm match ball M118LR): 20-round carton (M118 long range ball). There are 20 boxes per M2A1 ammo can (400 rounds) and two ammo cans per wire-bound crate (800 rounds). Used in precision match, designated marksman, and sniper rifles.
- AB79 (7.62mm ball M80A1 linked): 100-round M13 linked belt (M80A1 enhanced ball) packed in a cardboard box in an M4 bandoleer. There are two bandoleers (100 rounds each) per M19A1 ammo can (200 rounds total), and four M19A1 boxes per wire-bound crate (800 rounds total). Used in M240 general-purpose machine guns.
- AB86 (7.62mm ball/tracer linked): 100-round M13 linked belt (7.62mm ball/tracer linked) (4 × M80A1 enhanced ball : 1 M62A1 enhanced tracer) packed in a cardboard box in an M4 bandoleer. There are two bandoleers (100 rounds each) per M19A1 ammo can (200 rounds total), and four M19A1 boxes per wire-bound crate (800 rounds total). Used in M240 general-purpose machine guns.

== See also ==
- 7.62×54mmR – Russian military rifle cartridge
- 7 mm caliber – Firearm cartridge classification
- 7.62 mm caliber – Caliber of ammunition
- Caliber conversion sleeve – Device used to allow a firearm to fire a different cartridge
- STANAG – NATO technical standard (STANAG)
- List of 7.62×51mm NATO firearms
- List of rifle cartridges
- Table of handgun and rifle cartridges – Small arms cartridge data
