= CS/LR35 =

Bolt-action sniper rifle

- Type: Bolt-action sniper rifle
- Place of origin: People's Republic of China

Service history
- In service: 2020–Present
- Used by: See Users

Production history
- Manufacturer: Norinco
- Variants: See Variants

Specifications
- Mass: 6.2 kg (14 lb) (7.62×51mm) 7 kg (15 lb) (8.6×70mm)
- Length: 1,200 mm (47.2 in) (7.62×51mm); 1,300 mm (51.2 in) (8.6×70mm)
- Cartridge: 7.62×51mm CS/DEL3A; 8.6×70mm DBU-202; 7.62×51mm DBU-203
- Action: Bolt-action
- Effective firing range: 800–1,200 m (874.9–1,312.3 yd) (7.62×51mm); 1,200–1,500 m (1,312.3–1,640.4 yd) (8.6×70mm)
- Feed system: 5-round detachable box magazine
- Sights: Telescopic; night-vision; thermal sight

The CS/LR35 (military designation QBU-202 and QBU-203) is a bolt-action sniper rifle designed and manufactured by Chinese arms manufacturer Norinco. Developed from CS/LR4, the weapon is chambered with either 7.62×51mm cartridge or 8.6×70mm round in a 5-round box magazine. The rifle features a free-floating barrel and specifically designed munition that improves accuracy.

== Design and development ==
CS/LR35 is the further development of the CS/LR4 sniper rifle system. CS/LR35 is available in two versions chambered in either 7.62×51mm NATO or 8.6×70mm (.338 Lapua Magnum). Improvements include reinforced material for the barrel, lightweight rifle body, fully adjustable folding stock, and CS/DEL3A high precision cartridge in a 5-round box magazine. The weight is less than 6 kg (13 lb). The accuracy is claimed to be ≤0.5MOA at 100 m (110 yd), ≤0.75MOA at 300 m (330 yd), and ≤1MOA at 800 m (870 yd).

The 8.6×70mm variant of the rifle can be differentiated by its slightly longer barrel with a handguard that only has four ventilation holes whereas the 7.62 variant has seven smaller ones. The manufacturer claims that, with 8.6×70mm ammunition, the weapon has a conservative estimate of sub 1 MOA accuracy at 1,200 m (1,300 yd).

8.6×70mm variant of the CS/LR35 received designation QBU-202 with its scope designated QMK-201 variable zoom optics. 7.62×51mm variant of the CS/LR35 received designation QBU-203 with its scope designated QMK-201A.

== Variants ==
CS/LR35
Improved version of CS/LR4. Chambered in 7.62×51mm and 8.6×70mm Lapua Magnum.
QBU-202
Military version developed from CS/LR35 chambered in 8.6×70mm. In service with People's Liberation Army Ground Force.
QBU-203
Military version developed from CS/LR35 chambered in 7.62×51mm ammo.
CS/LR24
Export version of QBU-202, developed from CS/LR35 with minor modifications.
CS/LR4B
Export version of QBU-203, developed from CS/LR35 with minor modifications.

== Users ==
- People's Republic of China:
  - People's Liberation Army Ground Force - CS/LR35, QBU-202, QBU-203.

== See also ==
- CS/LR4
