= Kord machine gun =

Kord 6P50
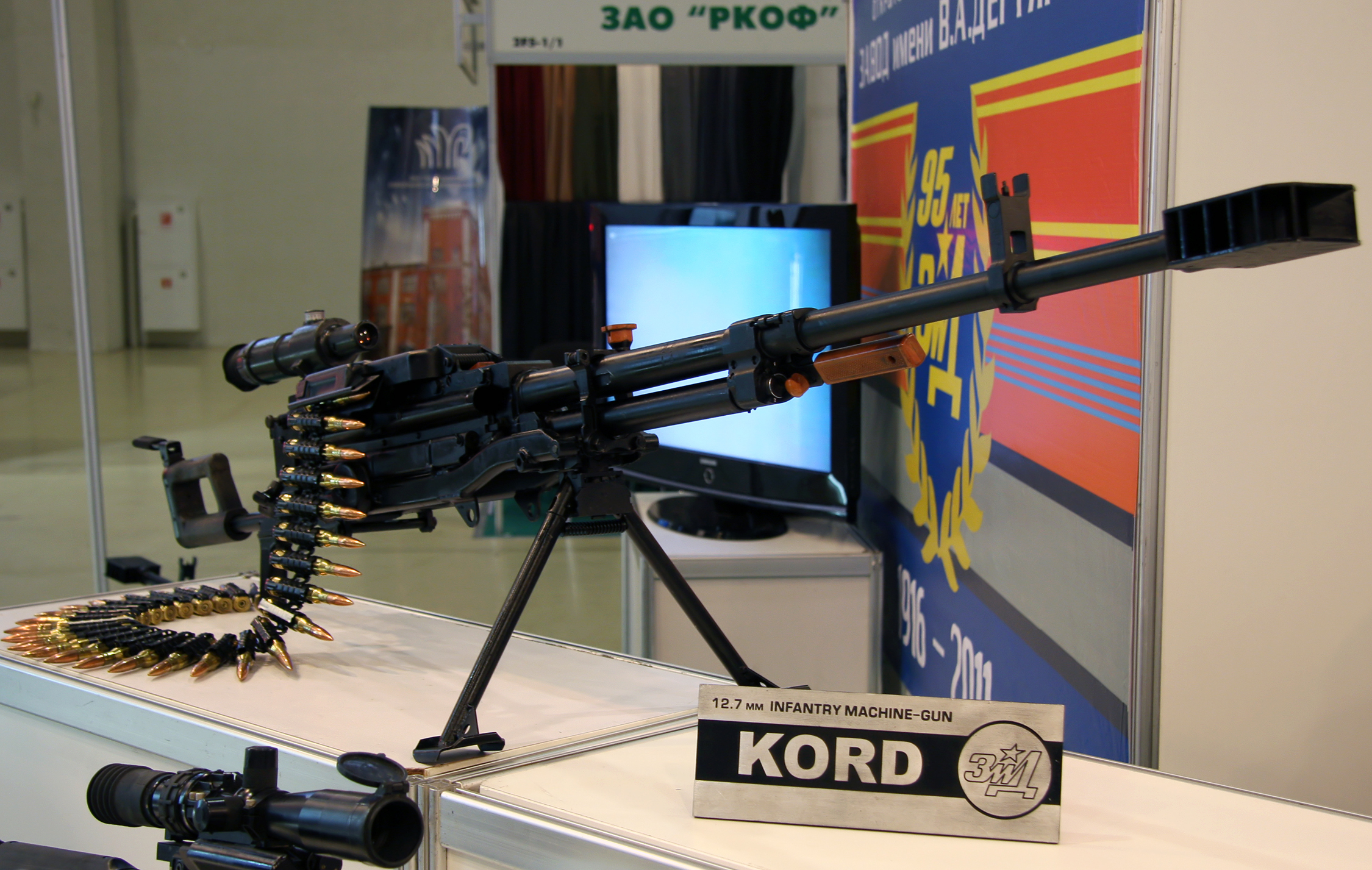
- Kord machine gun with a scope and 12.7x108mm rounds on belt displayed at the Interpolitex-2011
- Type: Heavy machine gun
- Place of origin: Russia

Service history
- In service: 1998–present
- Used by: Russian Army and Police (MVD)
- Wars: Second Chechen War; Russo-Georgian War; Syrian Civil War; War in Donbas; Russo-Ukrainian War

Production history
- Designer: A.A. Namitulin, N.M. Obidin, Ju.M. Bogdanov and V.I. Zhirokhin
- Designed: 1990s
- Manufacturer: V.A. Degtyarev Plant
- Produced: 1998–present
- Variants: 6P50-1, 6P50-2, 6P50-3, 6P49

Specifications
- Mass: 25.5 kg (56.22 lb) (6P50); 32 kg (71 lb) (6P50-1); 60 kg (130 lb) (6P50-2), 80 kg (180 lb) (6P50-3), 27 kg (60 lb) (6P49)
- Length: 1,980 mm (78.0 in) (6P50-1, 6P50-2, 6P50-3); 1,625 mm (64.0 in) (6P49)
- Barrel length: 1,070 mm (42.1 in)
- Cartridge: 12.7×108mm 12.7×99mm NATO (export)
- Action: Gas-operated, rotating bolt
- Rate of fire: 600–650 rounds/min
- Muzzle velocity: 860 m/s (2,821.5 ft/s)
- Effective firing range: 2000 m
- Feed system: 50-round linked belt
- Sights: Iron sights

The Kord-12.7 mm heavy machine gun is a Russian design that entered service in 1998 replacing the older NSV machine gun. Externally the weapon resembles the NSV; however, the internal mechanism has been extensively reworked, changing from a horizontally pivoting breech block to a rotating bolt design. Additionally the gas system has been changed and the muzzle baffle redesigned. These changes give the weapon reduced recoil compared with the NSV, allowing greater accuracy during sustained fire.

== Development ==
The catalyst for the development of the weapon was a complete lack of any heavy machine guns in construction at that time in the Russian Federation. Prior to the dissolution of the Soviet Union, the weapon that had functioned as the heavy machine gun was the NSV, or "Utyos" ("утёс", meaning one lonely cliff in Russian, this name was its designation during development) machine gun. The main production centre for the NSV was located in what is now Kazakhstan.

The Russian Degtyarev bureau was given the job of producing an updated version of the weapon chambered in the 12.7×108mm cartridge, which could be used for support, mounted on vehicles or in an anti-aircraft capacity. All variants of the weapon are also available chambered in the .50 BMG (12.7×99mm NATO) cartridge for export sales.

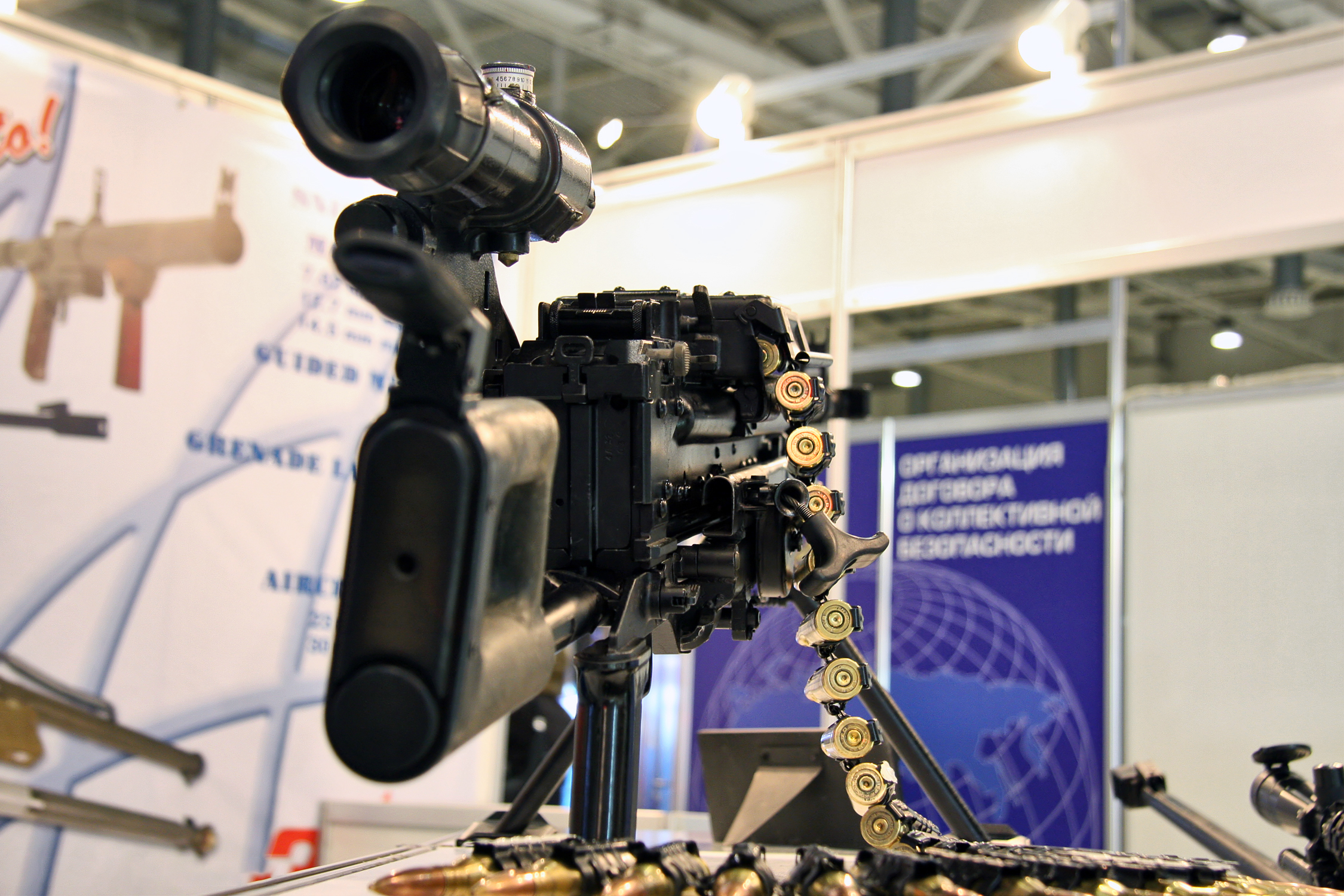

The weapon employs new construction, and consequently is significantly lighter than its predecessor. The firing mechanism is very rugged, and is capable of a greater rate of fire and significantly less recoil. Because a new barrel made of a high-tech alloy minimizes distortion and drop, accuracy has increased tremendously over previous Soviet machine guns. Unlike its predecessor, it may be fired from a bipod; a rather unusual feature for 12.7 mm/.50 caliber heavy machine guns. Its relatively light weight and lesser recoil allows stronger soldiers to move the gun around without assistance.

== Variants ==
- 6P49: Baseline variant for vehicle mounting.
- 6P50: Basic infantry version.
- 6P50-1 (6P57): 6T19 Bipod-mounted infantry version. Bipod provides ±15° range of traverse.
- 6P50-2 (6P58): Infantry variant.
- 6P50-3 (6P59): Mounted on boats, sea-going ships, and stationary objects on a 6U16 multipurpose mount. Casing ejection is to the right side.
- 6P51: Co-axial version with left-hand feed system and forward casing ejection.

== Remote weapon stations ==
- 6C21 is a Russian remote weapon station using Kord machine gun or PKMT machine gun.

== Combat history ==
The Kord first saw use with Russian forces in 2001 during the Second Chechen War, serving as a "light heavy machine gun" for clearing rooftops; and in 2008 during the Russo-Georgian War.

During the Syrian Civil War, the Kord was mounted on remote-controlled modules on Tigr infantry mobility vehicles for counter-insurgency operations. Syrian opposition fighters obtained Kord machine guns after capturing Assad regime MT-LBs or Tigr-M vehicles.

Faced with personnel shortages during Russo-Ukrainian War, the Russian Army created assault companies equipped with a handful of armoured vehicles, automatic grenade launchers, Kord machine guns, anti-tank missiles, with snipers, mortars and artillery support to conserve manpower while maximizing firepower, a tactic that was employed by the Wagner Group.

== Users ==
=== Current ===
- Namibia
- Russia
- Ukraine − Limited use of captured guns

=== Former ===
- Syrian opposition − Made use captured weapons during the Syrian Civil War

=== Evaluation-only ===
- Finland − for purposes of NSV replacement testing.

== Gallery ==
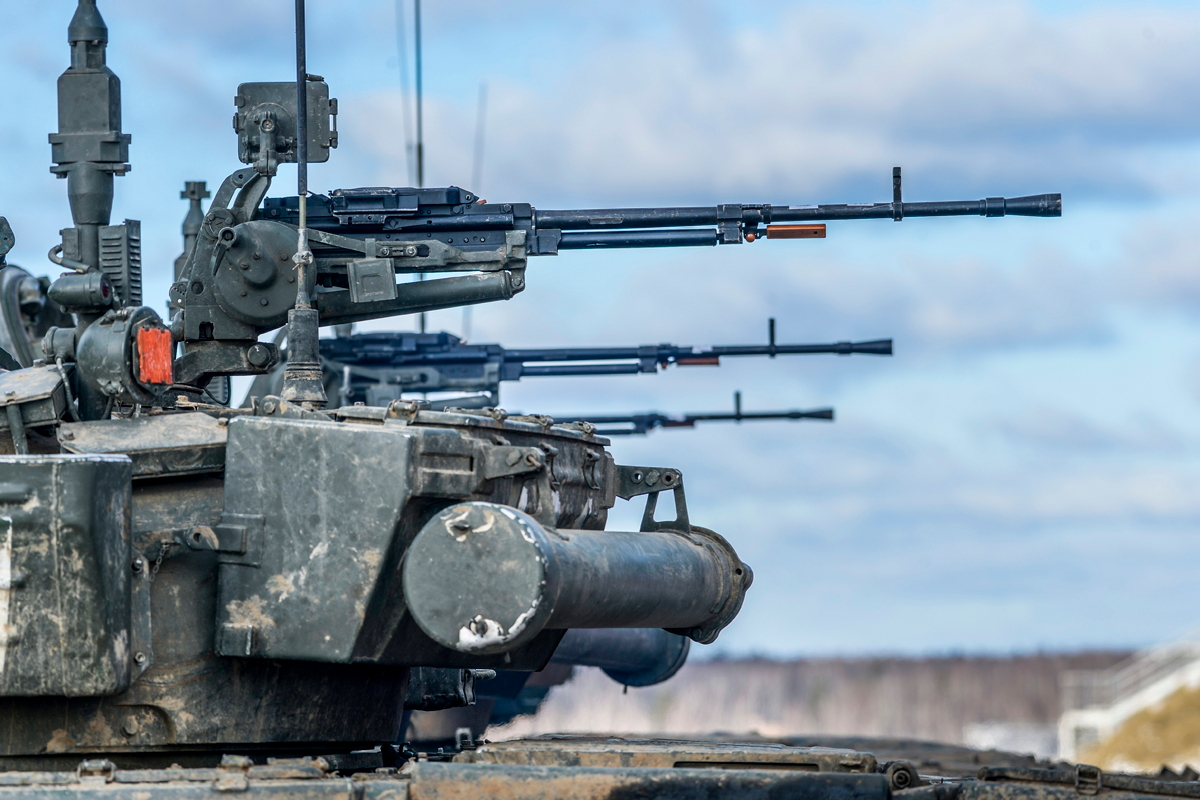
6P49

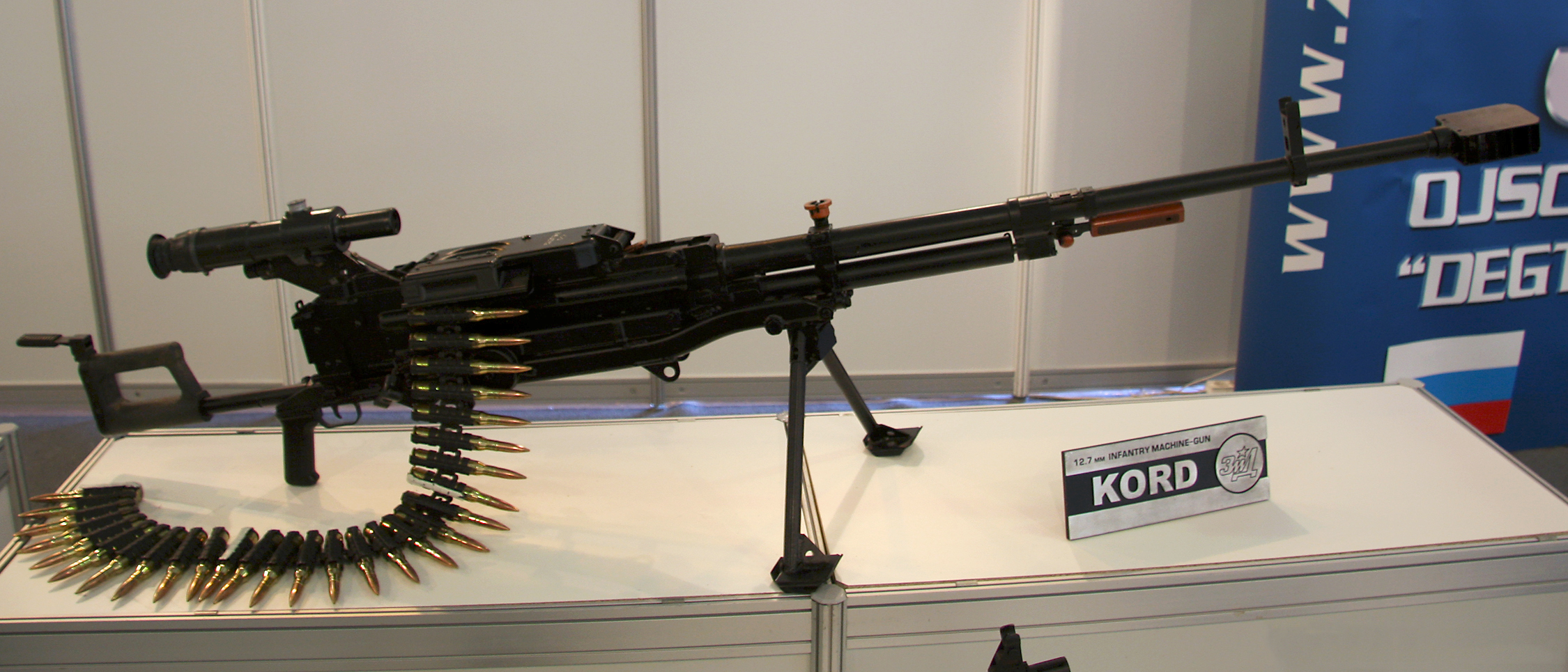
6P57

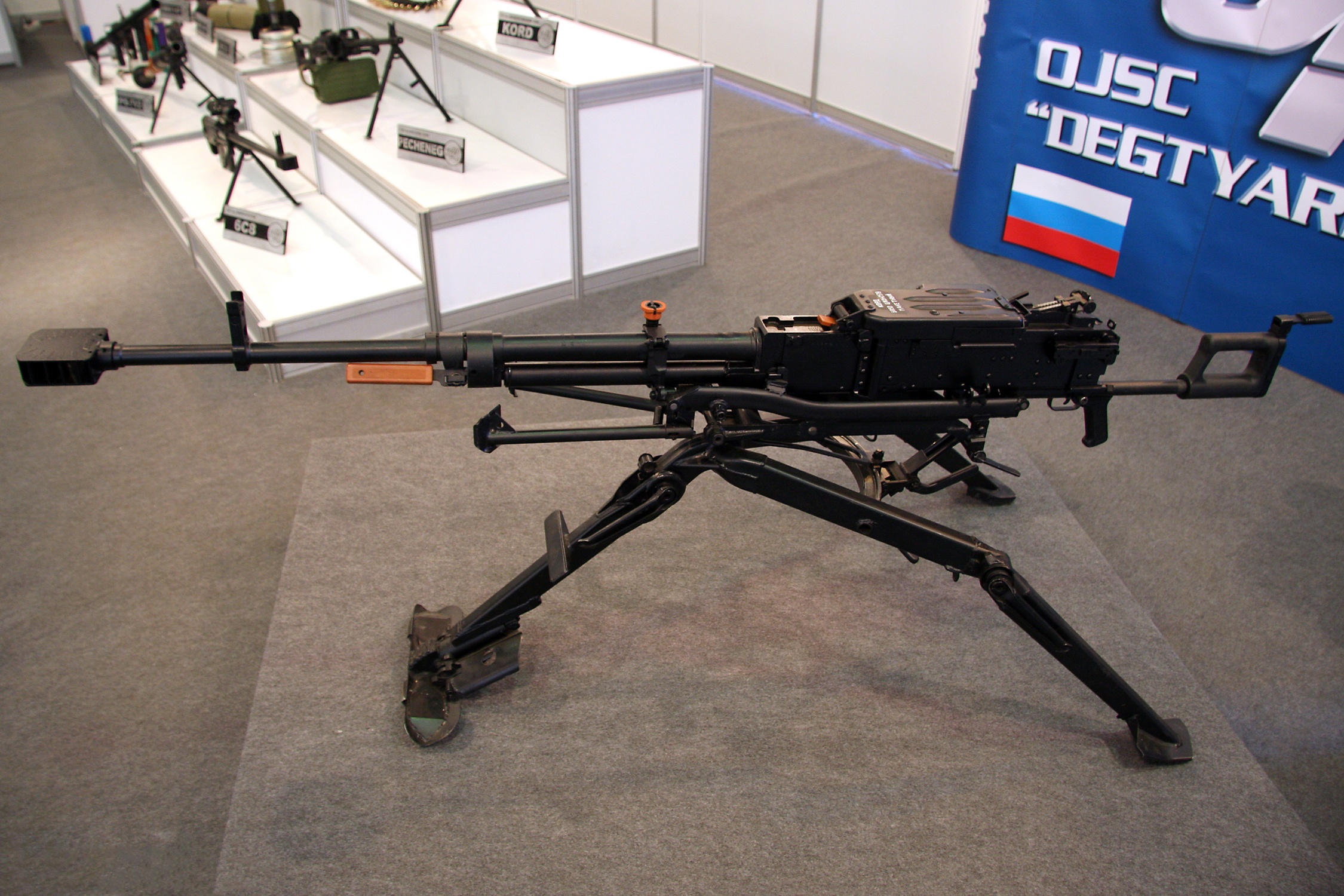
6P60

== See also ==
- List of Russian weaponry
- STK 50MG
- Rheinmetall RMG.50
- HMG PK-16
- Zastava M87
- Type 77 heavy machine gun
- W85 heavy machine gun
- QJZ-89
- QJZ-171
