= FLW remote weapon station =

Fernbedienbare leichte Waffenstation FLW
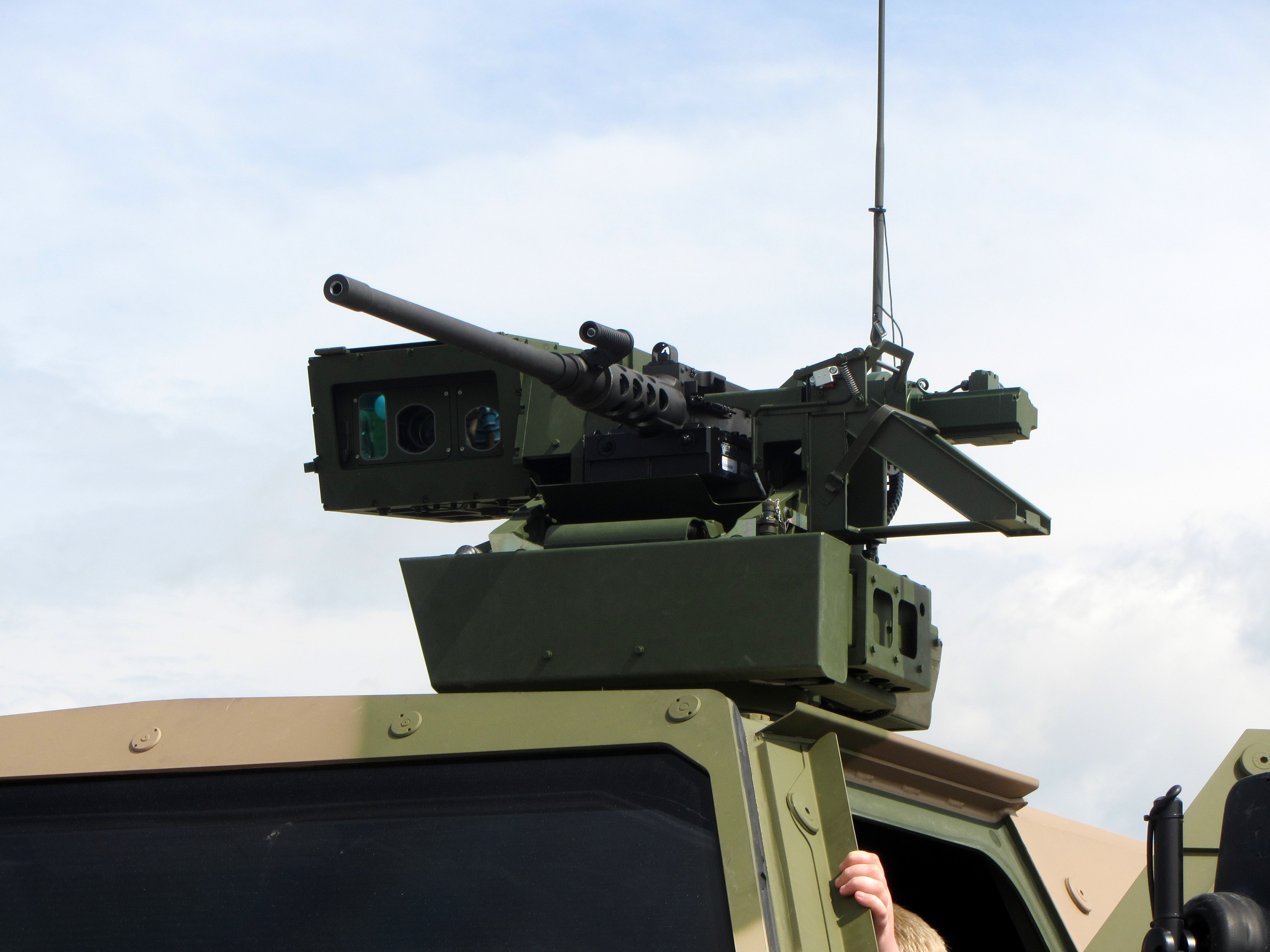
- A FLW 100 mounted on top of a Dingo 2 ATF
- Type: Remote Weapon System
- Place of origin: Germany

Service history
- Used by: German Army, Military of Qatar
- Wars: War in Afghanistan (2001–present)

Production history
- Designer: Krauss-Maffei Wegmann
- Designed: 2000s
- Manufacturer: Krauss-Maffei Wegmann
- Produced: Since 2008
- No. built: More than 980
- Variants: FLW-100, FLW-200, FLW-200+

Specifications
- Mass: 80 kilograms (180 lb) to 400 kilograms (880 lb), depending on variant
- Crew: 1
- Caliber: 7.62 mm, 12.7 mm, 20 mm, 40 mm grenades
- Elevation: -15° to 70/75°
- Traverse: 360°
- Maximum firing range: 1,000 metres (3,300 ft) to 2,000 metres (6,600 ft)
- Sights: CCD camera and thermal imager

FLW (fernbedienbare leichte Waffenstation) stands for "remotely operated, light weapon station" developed by the German defence company Krauss-Maffei Wegmann brands its family of remote weapon stations.

== Design ==
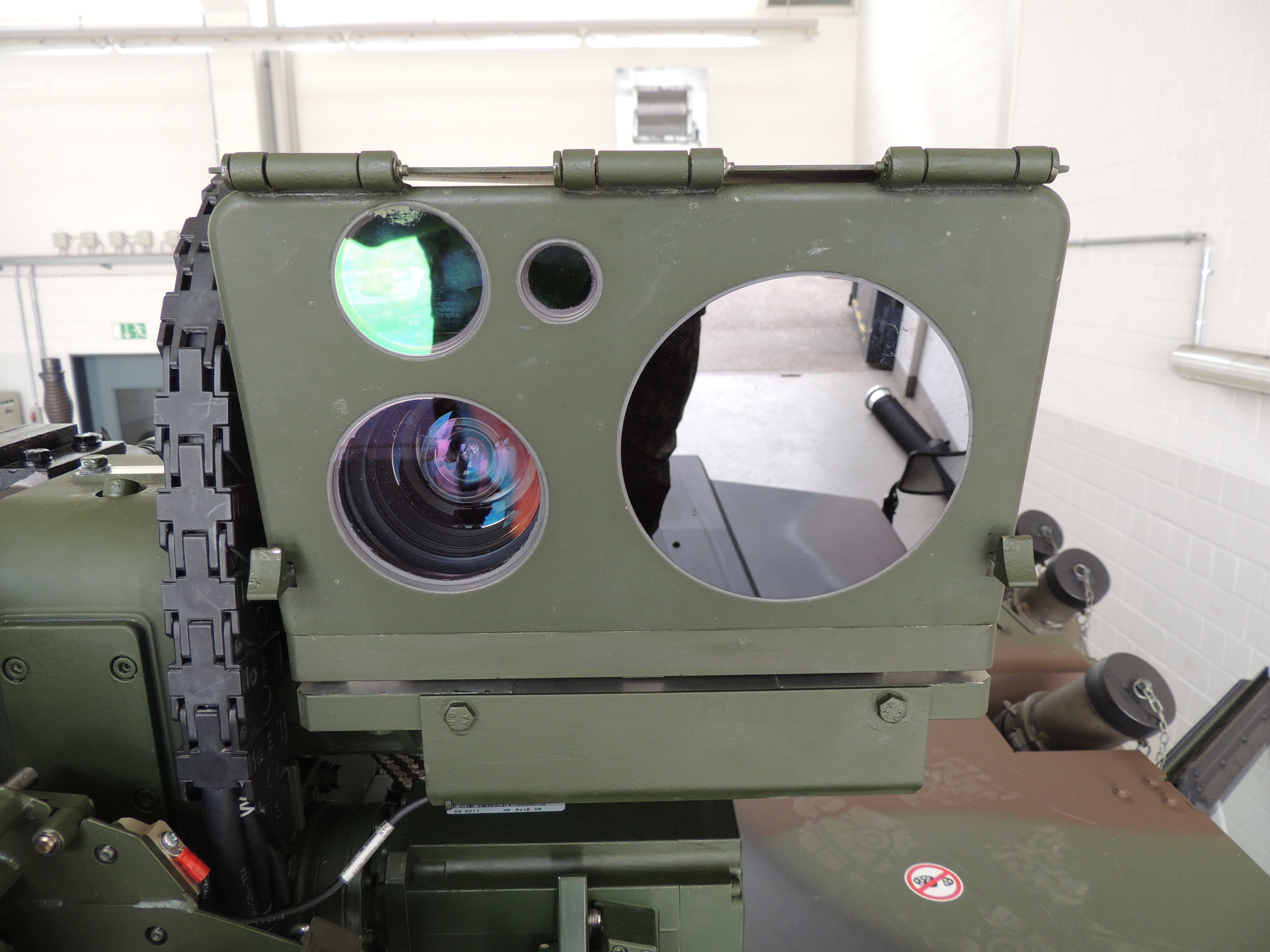
Rheinmetall LAZ 200 optronics of a FLW 100. It is fitted with a thermal imager, a camera and a laser rangefinder.

Development of the FLW 100 started in the mid-2000s to meet the requirements of the German Army. The slightly larger FLW 200 with greater weapon compatibility was designed shortly after. In 2008 the initial 230 light FLW 100 and 190 heavy FLW 200 weapon stations were delivered to the German Federal Office for Defence Technology and Procurement.

The FLW series can automatically detect the fitted weapons after replacement and will set the ballistic tables in the fire computer accordingly. None of the three versions require a penetration of the vehicle roof, which allows easier retrofitting of older vehicles with a FLW weapon station. All versions feature electronical dual-axis stabilization, where the weapon and the optronics are separately stabilized. The FLW is operated from the inside of the vehicle. The operator can view the output of the thermal imager or the camera on a 12-inch colour screen. A multi-position operation capability was being implemented in 2013, which allows the output of the sensors to be shared on multiple screens, allowing more than one soldier to observe the area with the FLW's optics and to operate the weapon station. Due to a high elevation the FLW 100 and the FLW 200 are well-suited for urban combat and operations in mountainous terrains.

The ammunition load is depending on the armament and the fitted ammo boxes, while the optronic systems are fitted in accordance with the customers' needs. The German Army has chosen the Rheinmetall LAZ 200 and LAZ 400L systems from Rheinmetall for the FLW series. Both systems feature a thermal imager, a high-resolution day CCD camera and a laser rangefinder. In the case of the LAZ 400L, the laser rangefinder is eye-safe and the thermal imager is cooled.

Future improvements might include a counter for the available ammunition, an automatic cleaning system for the optics and the integration of networking with a battlefield management system and warning sensors. Additionally the FLW remote weapon stations allow the adaption of ballistic armour protection and, command and simulation systems. A scan mode and new sensors (like a sniper detection system) can be integrated as well.

== Applications ==
Between 2008 and 2013, more than 980 FLW 100 and FLW 200 remote weapon stations have been ordered by the German Army. The FLW 100 and the FLW 200 have been fitted to versions of the Dingo 1 and 2, the upgraded Fuchs 1A8, the GTK Boxer, and Eagle.

The FLW 200 was fitted to the Leopard 2 PSO and 2A7 prototypes. While the German version of the Leopard 2A7 is not fitted with an RWS, the Qatari Leopard 2A7+ tanks are fitted with the FLW 200.

Meanwhile, the German Army has procured more than 1,000 FLWs.

In 2018 the German Bundespolizei ordered the FLW 100 for its armored vehicles.

== Versions ==
Currently there are three versions of the FLW weapon stations: the FLW 100 intended for light vehicles, the larger FLW 200 and the heavy FLW 200+.

=== FLW 100 ===
The FLW 100 is the lightest version of the FLW family, with a weight of only 80 kilograms (180 lb) without ammunition and gun. In order to fit an FLW 100, no roof penetration of the vehicle is required. The FLW 100 has a maximum gun depression of –15° and a maximum elevation of +75°. It can be armed with a single 5.56 mm or 7.62 mm machine gun and is intended for combat ranges up to 1,000 metres (3,300 ft).

The optronics of the FLW 100 are located in a container mounted behind the ammo box, located left of the gun. The sensors include a CCD colour camera with 10× magnification, which offers an identification range of up to 1.5 kilometres (0.93 mi), and an uncooled thermal imager with a 640x480 resolution. The identification range of the thermal imager is 1 kilometre (0.62 mi).

For self-protection and non-lethal combat, the FLW 100 can be fitted with the Wegmann 40 mm protection system.

=== FLW 200 ===
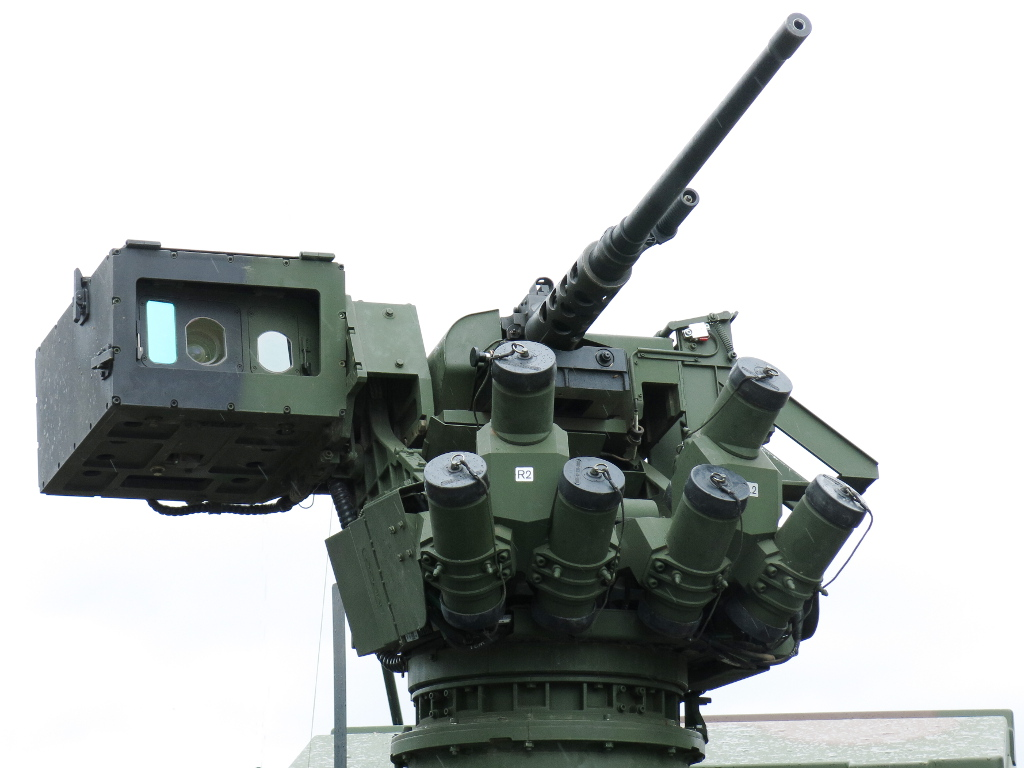
A FLW 200 system mounted on top of Boxer AFV.

In comparison to the FLW 100, the FLW 200 has a slightly lower maximum elevation of only 70°, and it is also heavier, weighing about 160 kilograms (350 lb) without weapons and ammunition. However unlike the smaller predecessor, the FLW 200 can be fitted with a 12.7 mm heavy machine gun, such as the M2 Browning, or with a 40 mm automatic grenade launcher. In case of the German Army, the 40 mm GMW from Heckler & Koch is the preferred grenade launcher, while the M2 HMG or the new Rheinmetall RMG.50 are used as a machine guns. The FLW 200 can hold either 100 or 200 rounds of 12.7 mm ammunition, depending on the size of the ammo box. For the 40 mm launcher only a container for a total of 32 grenades is available. The heavier armament compared to the FLW 100 results in a combat range of up to 2,000 metres (6,600 ft).

The optronics of the FLW 200 are located in a container mounted at the right side of the gun, whereas the ammo box is located on the left side. The optronics include a colour CCD camera with x10 magnification and a cooled thermal imager, unlike that of the FLW 100. This increases the identification range to 2 kilometres (1.2 mi). The FLW 200 can be fitted with six 76 mm Wegmann smoke grenade dischargers for additional self-protection of the vehicle.

In 2013, the electrically driven Rheinmetall RMG.50 was being qualified for the FLW 200.

=== FLW 200+ ===
The FLW 200+ (FLW 200Plus) was first revealed at Eurosatory 2012. It is a modified version of the FLW 200, designed to handle even larger weaponry such as autocannons up to the 20 mm caliber. In the case of the prototypes, the FLW 200+ has always been presented with a Rheinmetall Rh 202 gun. The FLW 200+ was demonstrated on a GTK Boxer and on a PMMC G5 from German FFG. The FLW 200+ is intended as a simple replacement and upgrade of the original FLW 200. None of the mechanical and electronic interfaces have been altered, making it backwards compatible for upgrading vehicles fitted with the previous version.

The FLW 200+ has a weight of 475 kilograms (1,047 lb) when fitted with the Rh 202 autocannon and 100 rounds of ammunition. The Rh 202 has a dual-feed mechanism, that allows the usage of 100 rounds of one type and 30 rounds of another type at the same time, with the possibility of switching the selected ammo type in between the shots. Compared to the FLW 200, the elevation arc has decreased to a maximum elevation of only +50°. The maximum depression of -15° stayed the same. The FLW 200+'s optics include a colour CCD camera with x10 magnification and a cooled 640x480 thermal imager with two different fields of view, providing an identification range of over 2 kilometres (1.2 mi).

=== FLW 500 ===
The FLW 500 was first revealed at Eurosatory 2016. It appears to be a modified version of the FLW 200 base, designed to handle even larger weaponry such as autocannons up to the 30 mm caliber. It has a typical weight of 500 kg.

When fitted with the M230LF it offers 150 rounds of ready-to-use ammunition. A coaxial 7.62 mm FN-MAG machine gun (MG) is provided with 250 rounds of ready-use ammunition. The weapons are fully stabilized with the mount featuring electric traverse through 360° and elevation from -10 to 50°.

== Gallery ==
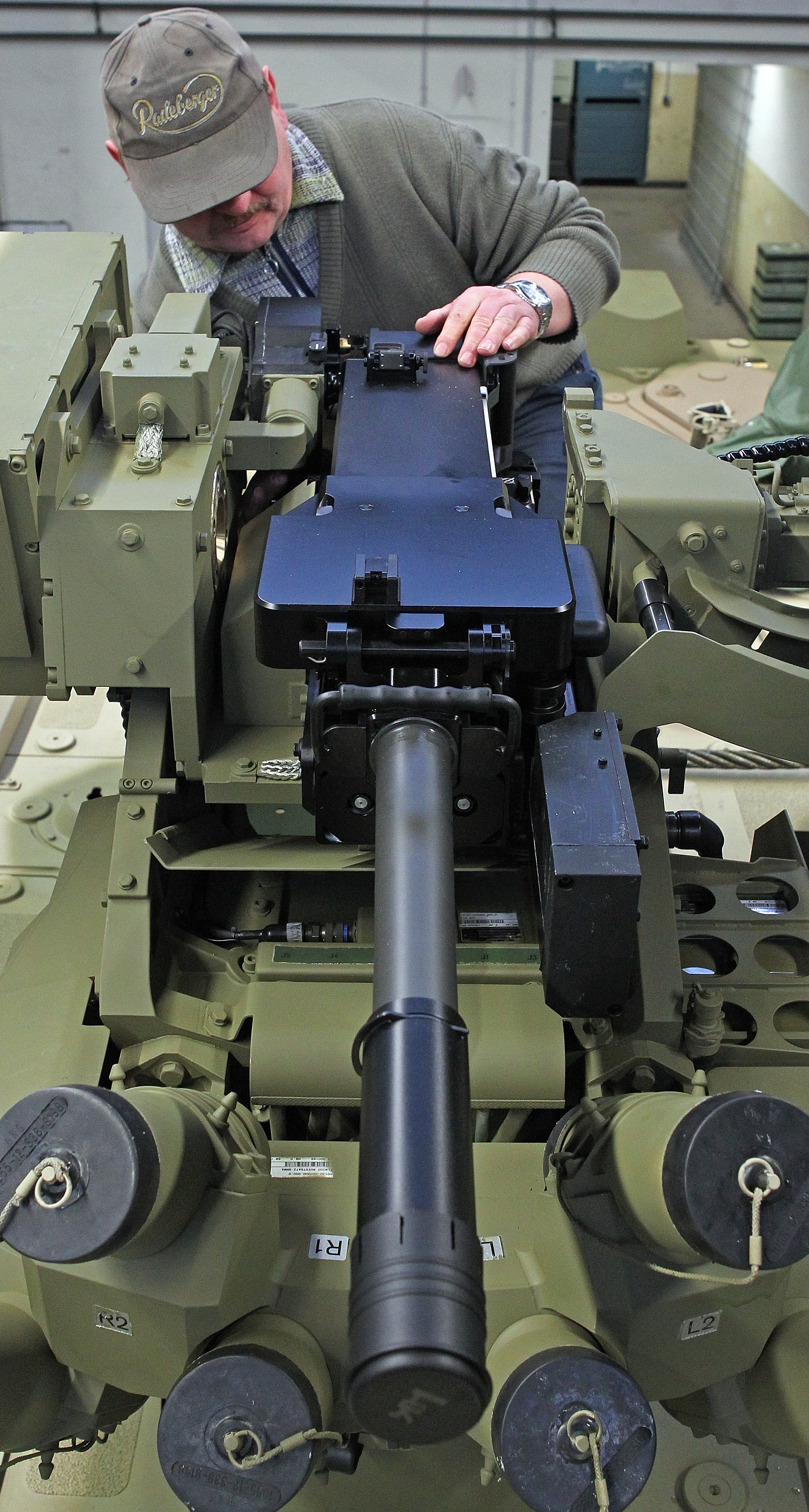
FLW 200 armed with a GMW on a Boxer

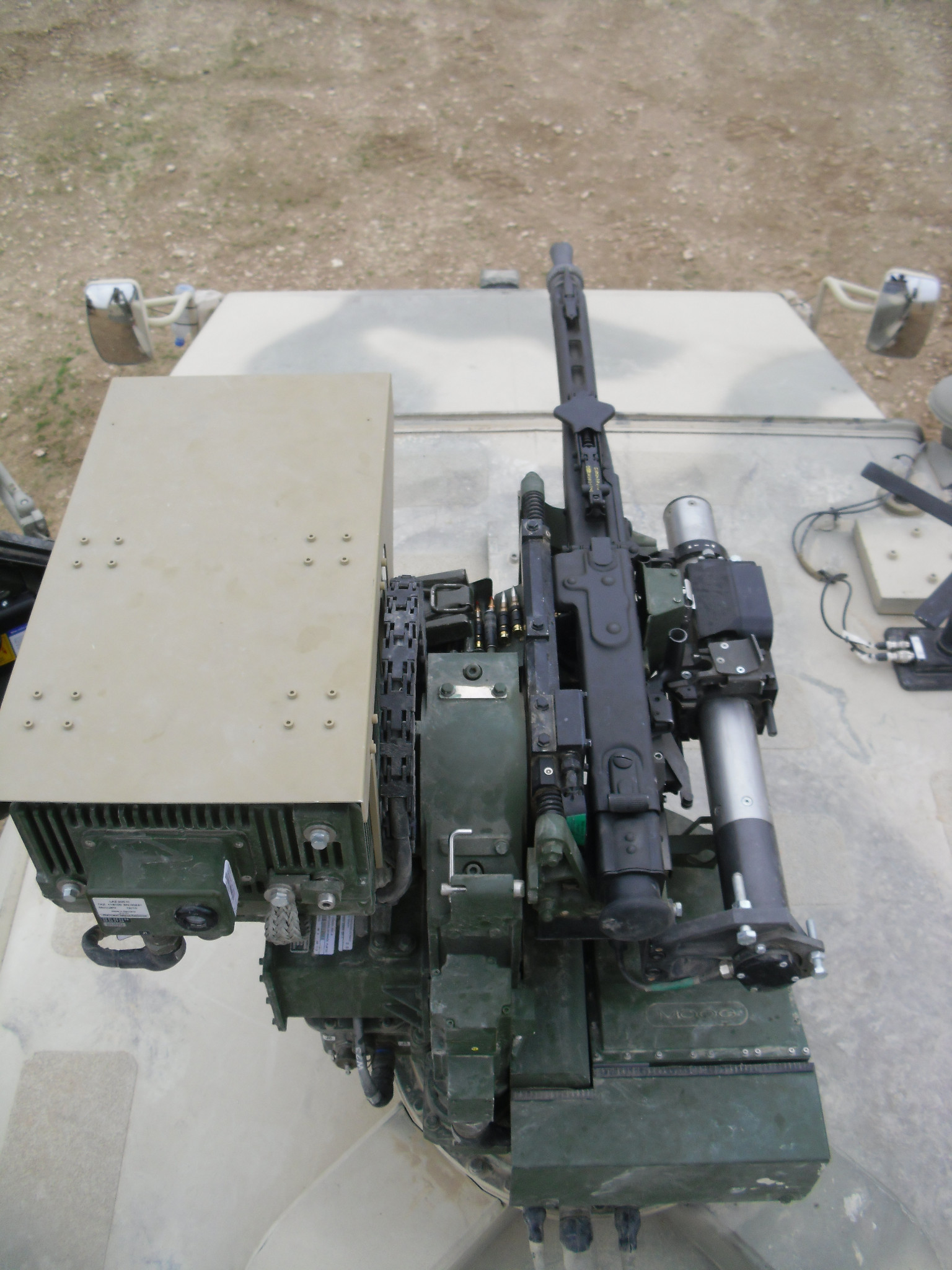
Top-view of a FLW 100 with MG3 on a Dingo

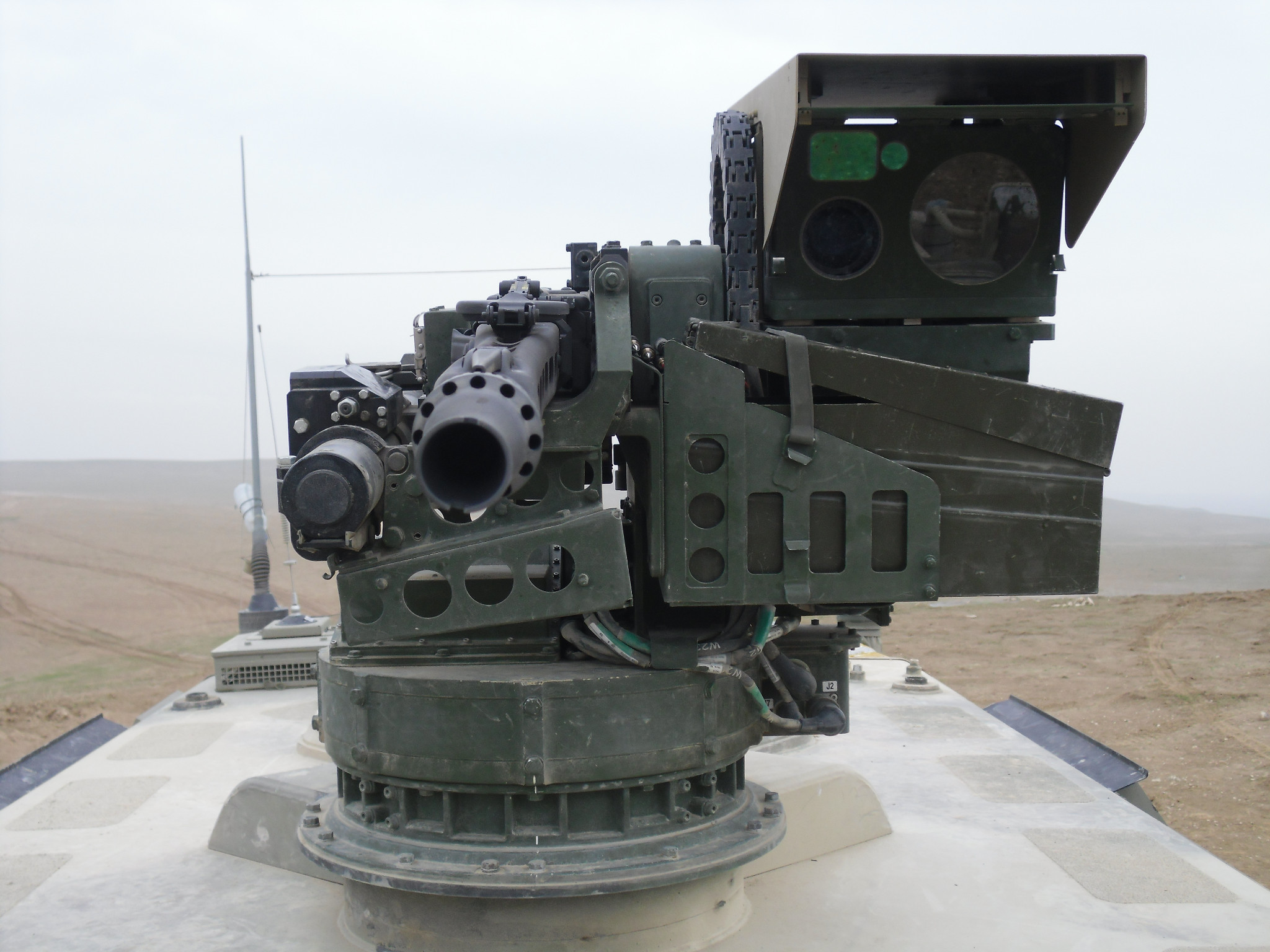
Front-view of the same FLW 100

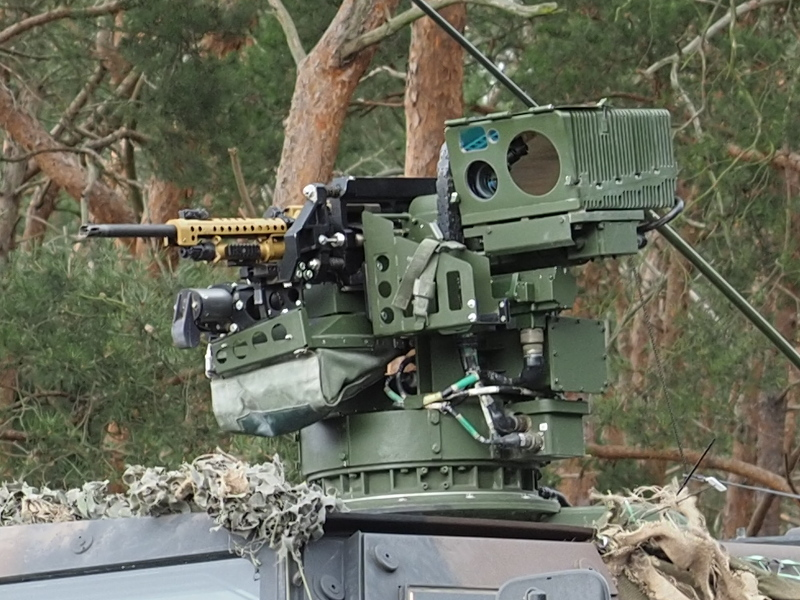
FLW 100 with MG5 A1 mounted on a Dingo

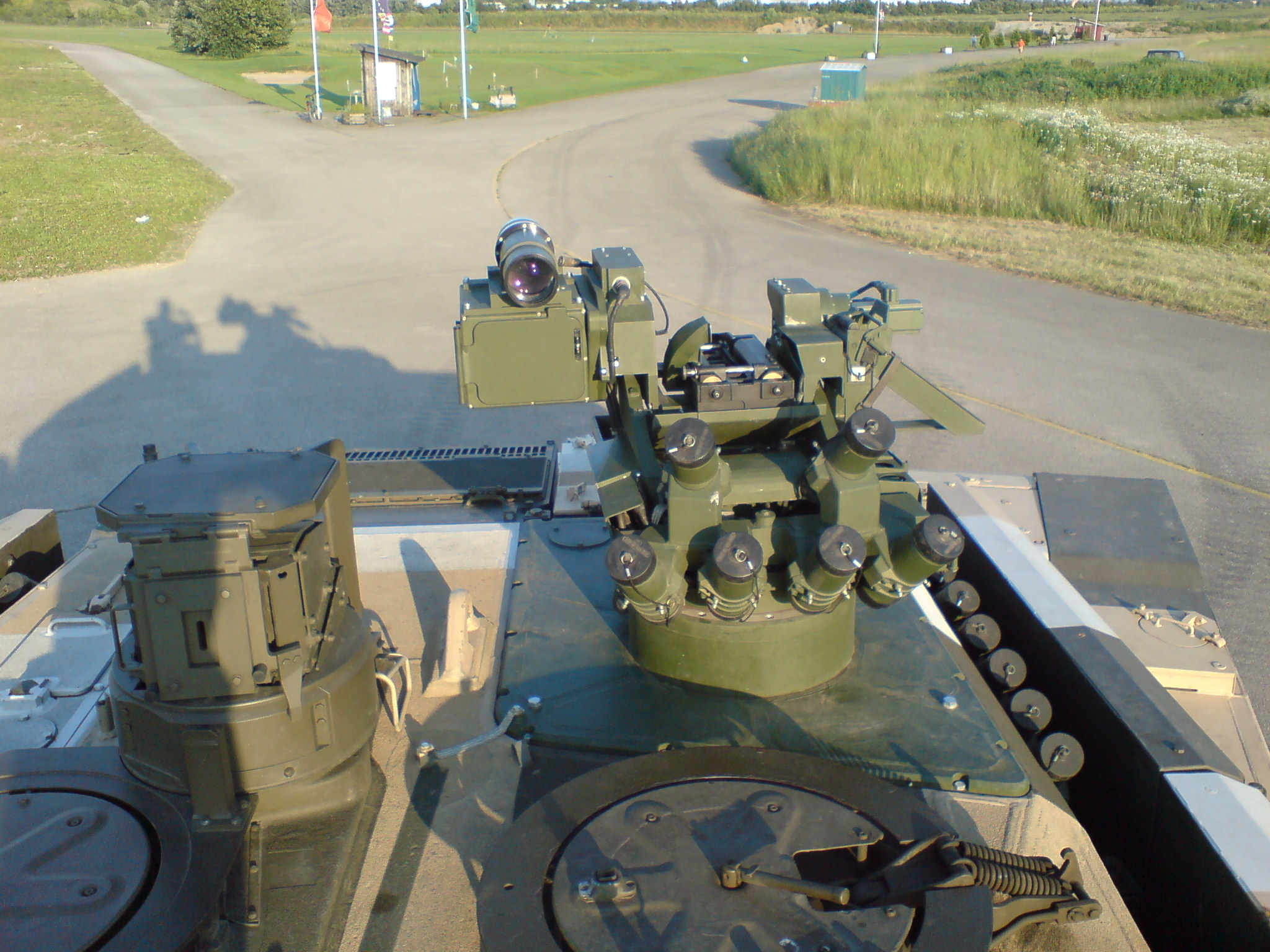
FLW 200 fitted to the Leopard 2 PSO prototype

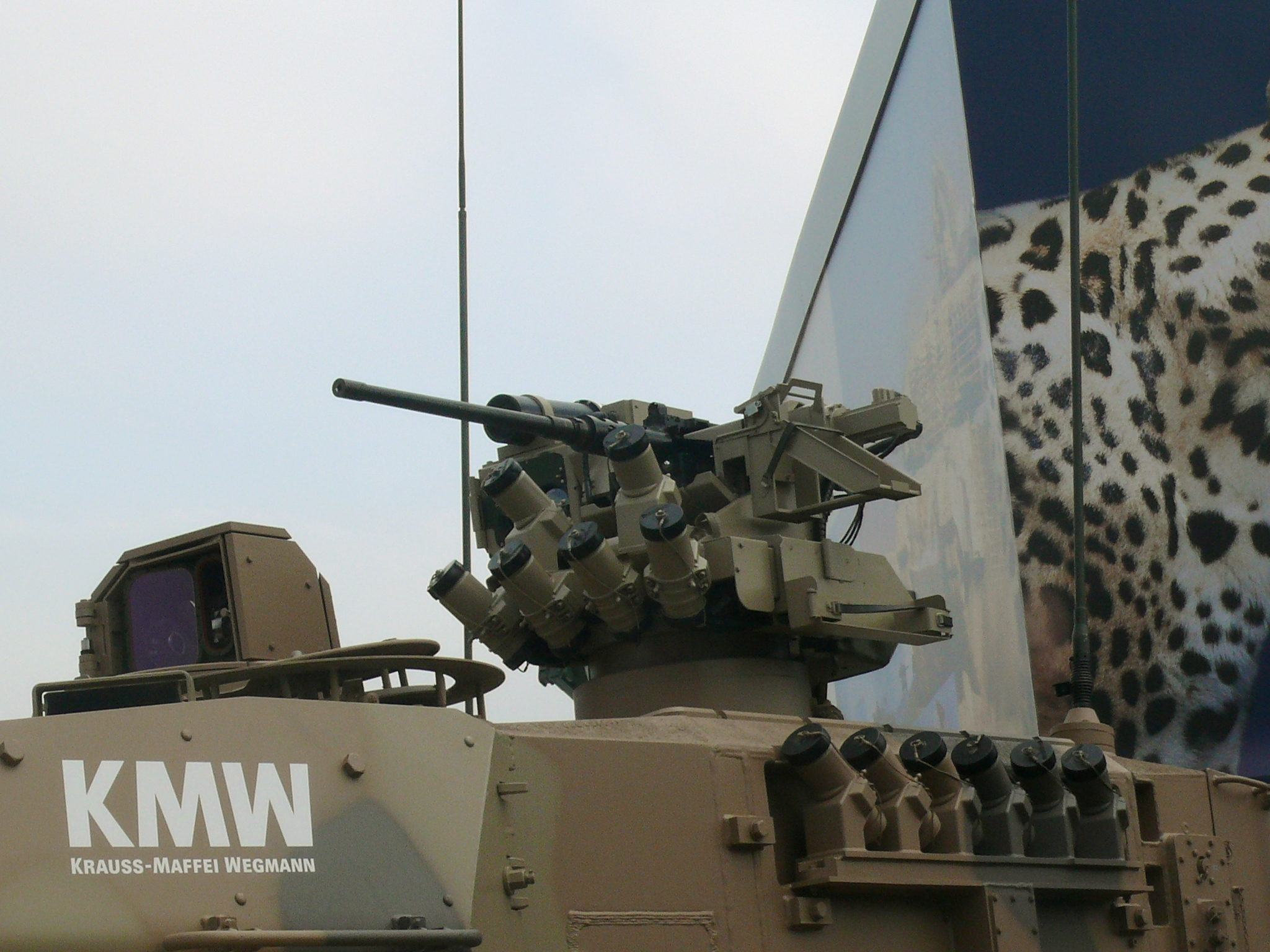
Leopard 2A7+ prototype with FLW 200

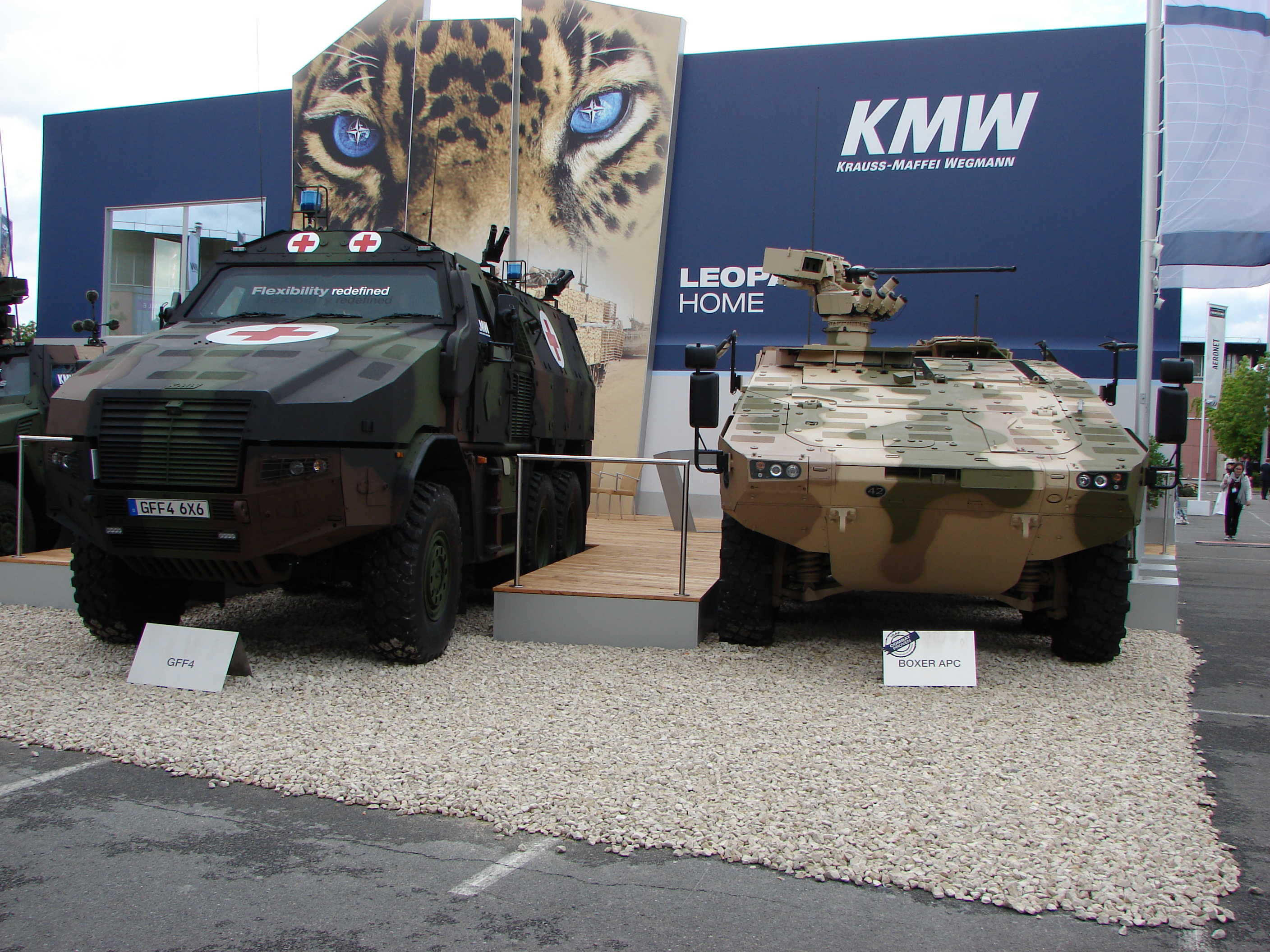
Boxer A1 with FLW 200+ on the Eurosatory 2012
