= Type 77 heavy machine gun =

Type 77 Heavy Machine Gun QJG-85
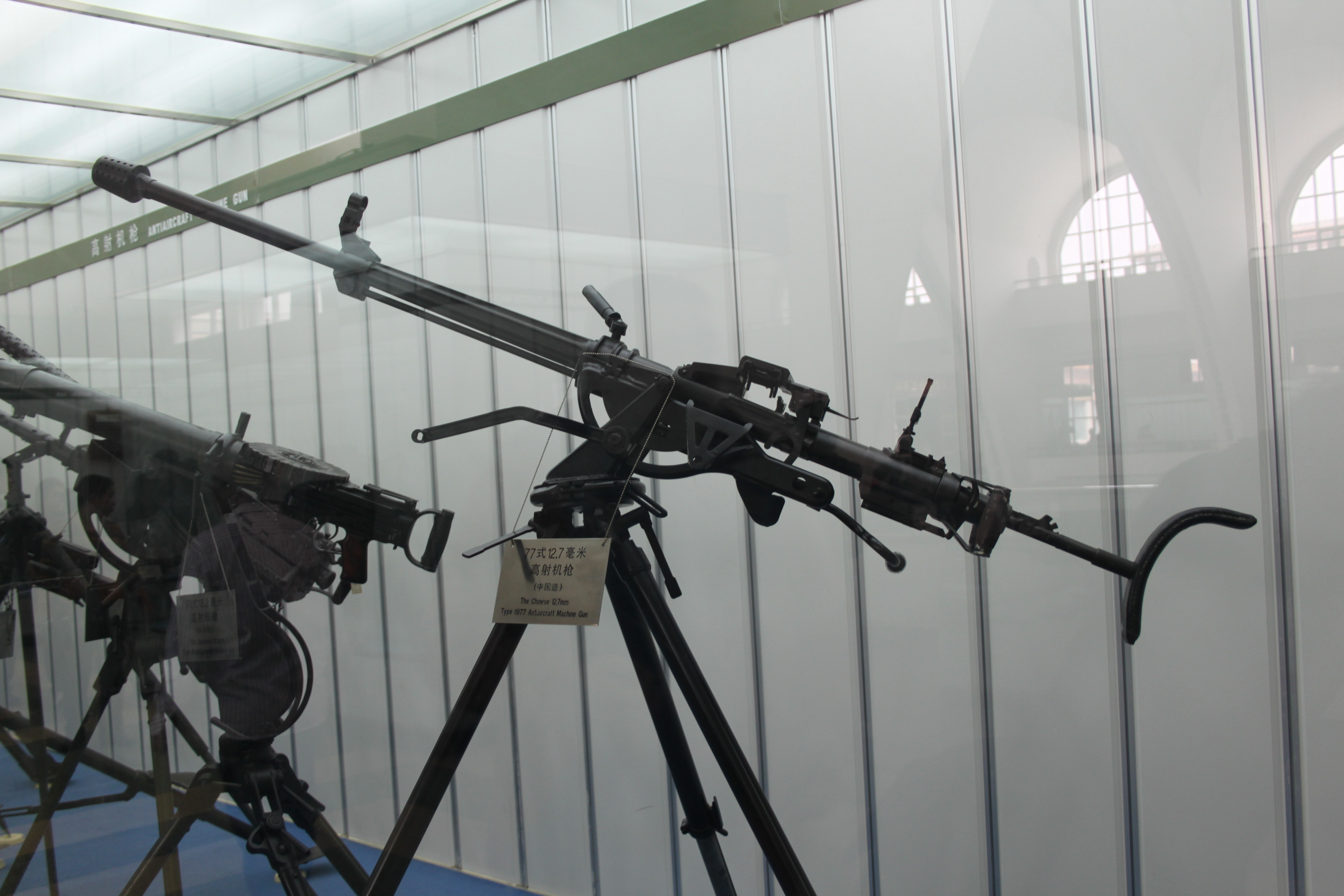
- Type 77 heavy machine gun
- Type: Heavy machine gun
- Place of origin: China

Service history
- In service: 1977—present
- Wars: Syrian Civil War; Mali War; M23 rebellion Tigray War; War in Sudan (2023)

Production history
- Manufacturer: Norinco
- Produced: 1977-

Specifications
- Mass: 28 kg (61.73 lb) (gun only); 28.3 kg (62.39 lb) (tripod)
- Length: 2,150 mm (84.6 in)
- Barrel length: 1,016 mm (40.0 in)
- Cartridge: 12.7×108mm
- Action: hybrid short-recoil and direct gas impingement
- Rate of fire: 650-700 rounds/min
- Muzzle velocity: 825 m/s (2,710 ft/s)
- Feed system: 60-round belt
- Sights: Iron/Optical

The Type 77 heavy machine gun or Type 85 is a Chinese 12.7×108mm heavy machine gun.

== History ==
During the mid-1970s, China decided to develop a lighter 12.7 mm machine gun to replace the Type 54 (indigenous DShK) that was more suited for mobile anti-aircraft applications. The weapon was adopted in 1977 and mass production commenced in 1980.

== Design ==
To save weight, the Type 77 used a hybrid short-recoil and direct gas impingement operated action, somewhat unusual for a machine gun, resulting in few moving parts and a long and slim, tubular receiver. Overall weight of the gun and tripod comes to about 56 kg (120 lb), less than half that of a mounted Type 54/DShK, though it retains the same locking system and belt feed.

The barrel is also thinner as light weight was favored over volume of fire, which causes it to overheat faster, with a prominent "pepperpot" muzzle brake. It has iron sights and a mount for a low-magnification optical sight suitable for engaging ground and air targets. The gun also has a large charging handle below the receiver, shoulder stock, and fires from an open bolt.

== Variants ==
=== Type 85 heavy machine gun ===
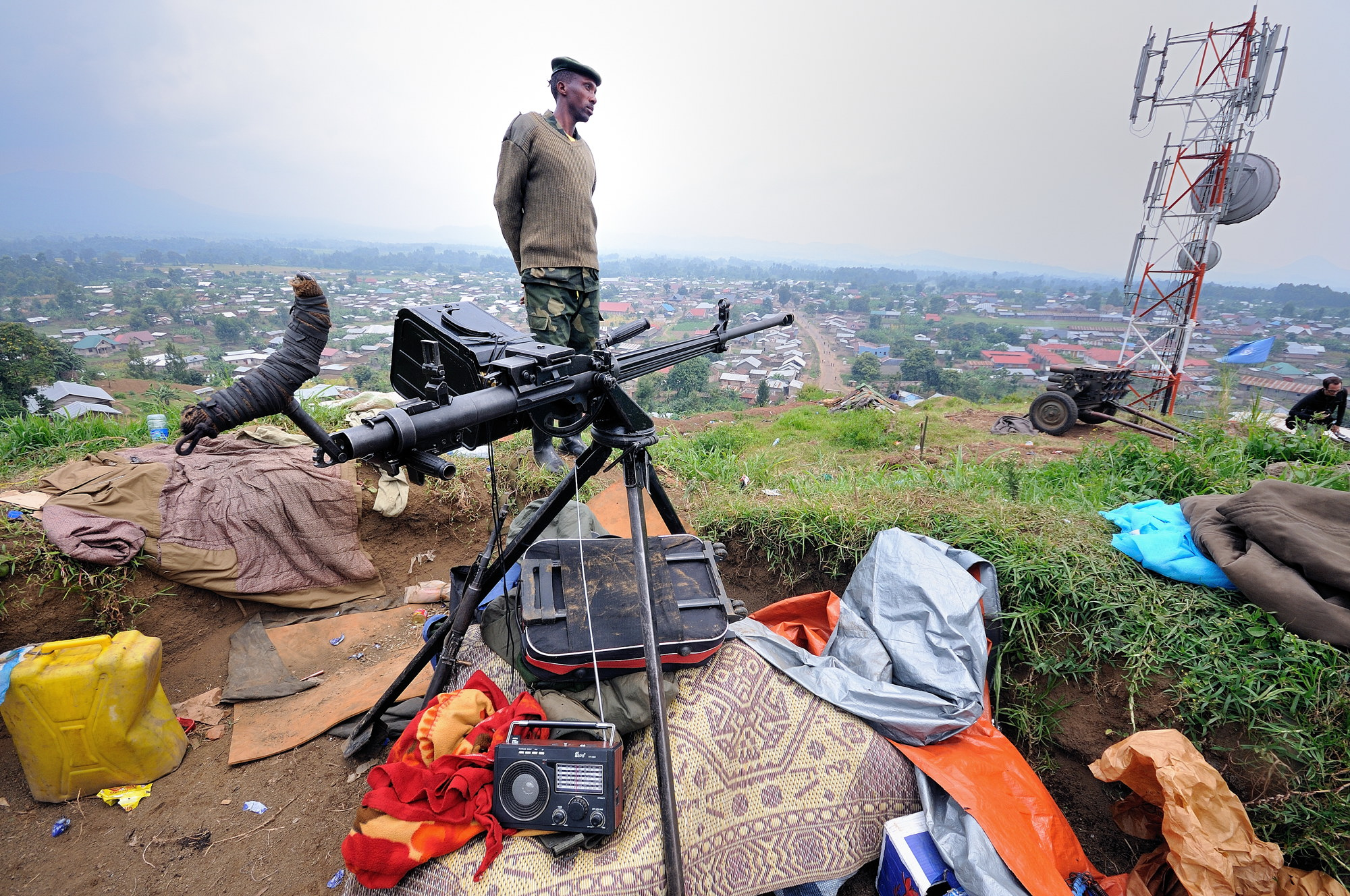
A Type 85 (improved Type 77) in the Democratic Republic of the Congo during the M23 rebellion

Military designation QJG-85. Five years after the Type 77 entered service, it was replaced in production by the updated Type 85 heavy machine gun. An evolution on the Type 77, it used a more conventional muzzle brake and replaced the spade grips and separate cocking handle with horizontal grips and a sliding trigger unit, the entirety of which is moved forward and back to cock the gun. The gun and tripod were also lighter, weighing 24 kg (53 lb) and 17.5 kg (39 lb) respectively. Both weapons can be mounted on vehicles.

== Users ==
- Afghanistan
- Cambodia
- China
- Pakistan
- Djibouti
- Iraq: Used by Unmanned ground vehicle "Alrobot". Also used by the Popular Mobilization Forces.
- Rwanda
- South Sudan
- Niger
- Sudan
- Yemen

=== Non-State Actors ===
- (Syria) Free Syrian Army and Turkish-backed Free Syrian Army
- Islamic State
- People's Movement for the Liberation of Azawad
- Tigray Defense Forces

== See also ==
- QJG-02
- QJC-88
- QJY-89
- DShK
- NSV
- M2 Browning
- Kord machine gun
