= QJG-02 =

QJG 02
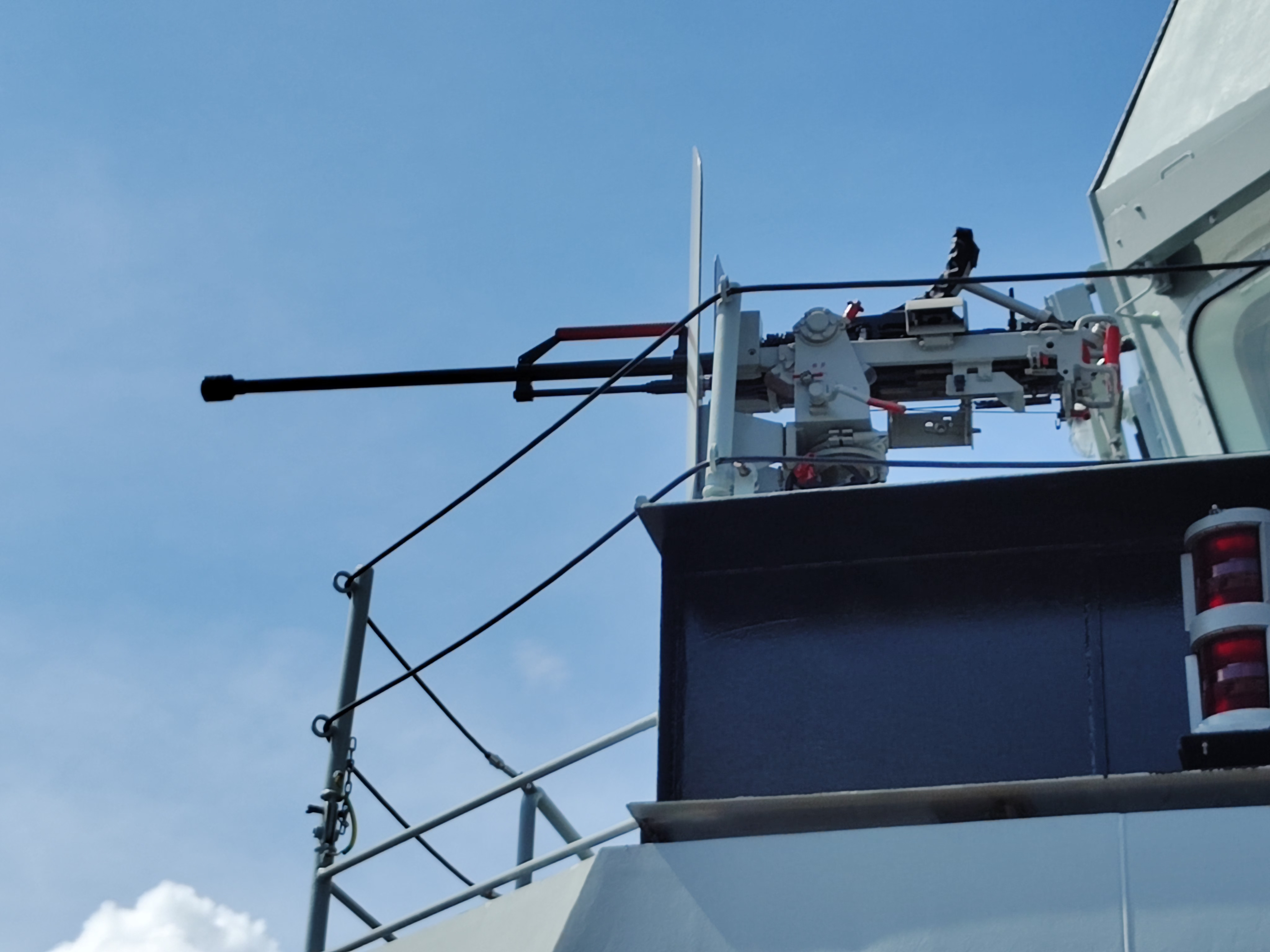
- Type: Heavy machine gun
- Place of origin: China

Production history
- Designed: 1998
- Manufacturer: Norinco
- Produced: 2002

Specifications
- Mass: 75 kg (165 lb) (QJG 02); 110 kg (240 lb) (QJG 02G with wheeled mount) on AA mount / tripod
- Length: 2,390 mm (94 in)
- Barrel length: 1,350 mm (53 in)
- Cartridge: 14.5×114 mm
- Calibre: 14.5 mm (0.57 in)
- Action: Gas-operated
- Rate of fire: 600 rounds/min
- Muzzle velocity: 995 m/s (3,260 ft/s)
- Effective firing range: 2,000 m (6,600 ft)
- Feed system: 50-round Belt

The QJG-02, known by its export version as the CS/LM2, is a Chinese anti-aircraft heavy machine gun manufactured by Norinco for the People's Liberation Army. An updated variant, the QJG-02G, also known as the Type CS/LM2A, was later released.

== Design and development ==
The QJG-02 is China's replacement for the Type 58, a direct copy of the Soviet KPV heavy machine gun. The QJG-02 features an indigenous design, which is similar to the Chinese W85 heavy machine gun. In 1990s, China began to develop new lightweight anti-aircraft gun, and the design was finalized in 2002. In 2004, China adopted the Type 02.

The weapon uses 14.5×114mm ammunition, and can be mounted on tripods and vehicles. The whole system, including its low-profile, single-gun mountings, weighs 75 kilograms (165 lb). The rate of fire is 600 rounds per minute.

== Variants ==
- QJG-02: original variant.
- QJG-02G: improved variant. The new variant features a different tripod that is fitted with small wheels, allowing the QJG-02G to be towed by a light utility vehicle.

== Users ==
- China
- Iraq
- Iran

== See also ==
- QJZ-89
- W85 heavy machine gun
