= QJZ-89 =

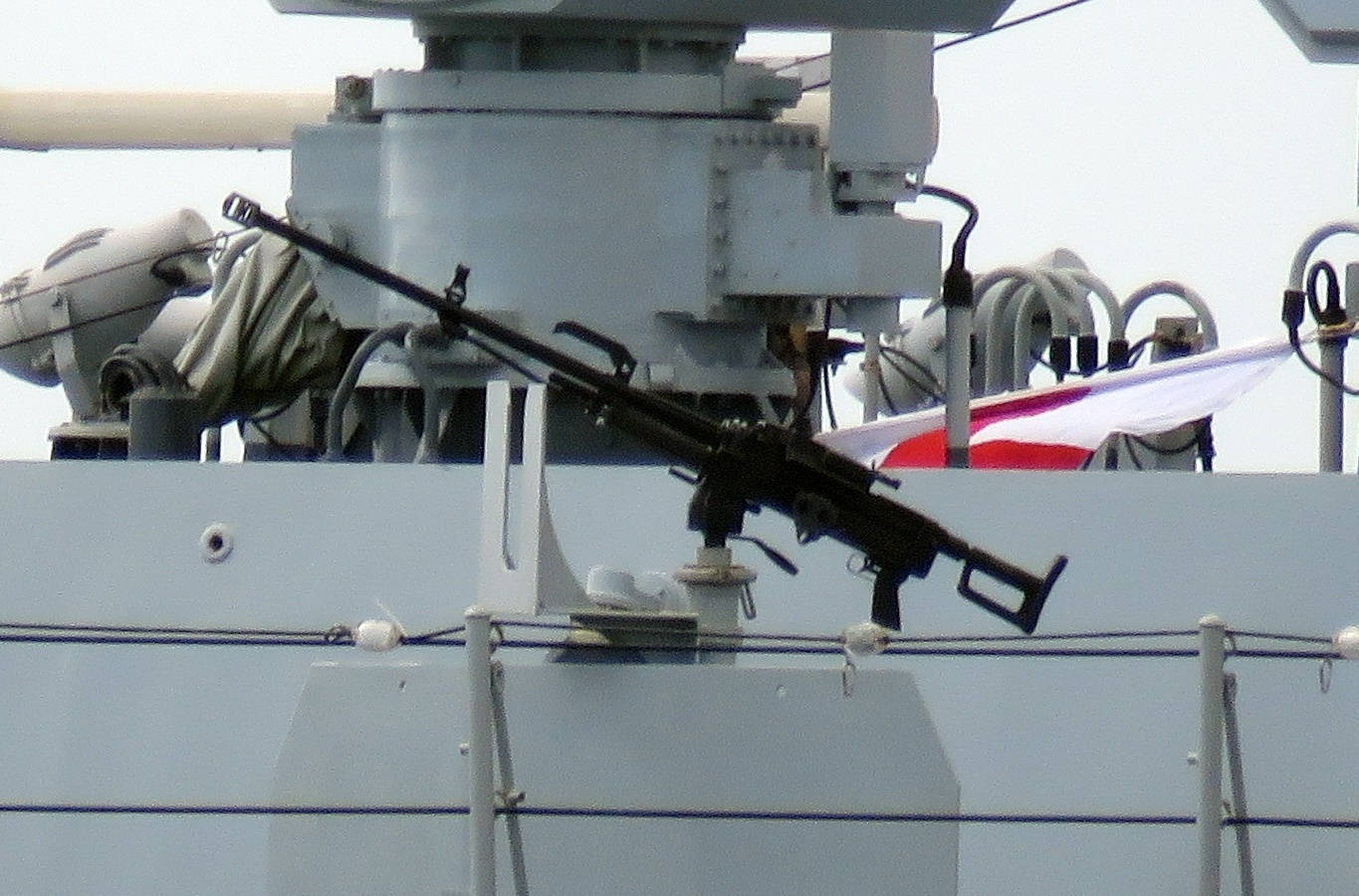
- QJZ-89 machine gun mounted on the guardrails of a Type 054A frigate
- Type: Heavy machine gun
- Place of origin: China

Service history
- Used by: China

Production history
- Manufacturer: Norinco

Specifications
- Mass: 17.5 kg (38.58 lb) (gun only); 8.5 kg (18.74 lb) (tripod)
- Length: 1,640 mm (64.6 in) (gun only); 2,119 mm (83.4 in) (with tripod)
- Barrel length: 1,003 mm (39.5 in)
- Cartridge: 12.7×108mm
- Caliber: 12.7mm
- Barrels: 1
- Action: Hybrid recoil-direct gas impingement
- Rate of fire: 450-600 rounds/min
- Muzzle velocity: 820 m/s (2,700 ft/s)
- Effective firing range: 1,500 m (4,921.3 ft)
- Feed system: 50-round belt
- Sights: Iron sights

The QJZ-89, also known as the Type 89 heavy machine gun, is a heavy machine gun designed in the People's Republic of China which fires the Soviet 12.7×108mm ammunition.

== History ==
In the early 1980s, Chinese firearms designers had received scattered information from Soviet publications regarding the Soviet Union's adoption of the NSV machine gun. Due to a translation error, the Chinese weapons industry misinterpreted the 25 kg (55 lb) gun-only weight as the weight of the entire system. Astonished by the apparent capability of the NSV, Chinese designers began to develop a comparable weapon system. Only after the development had concluded did they realize the 25 kg (55 lb) weight figure did not include the tripod.

The gun and tripod together only weigh 26 kg (57 lb), which is even lighter than the 32 kg (71 lb) Russian Kord machine gun on a bipod mount.

== Design ==
The weapon features a hybrid gas and recoil-operated action. The gas system cycles the bolt group, with the receiver recoil inside the outer gun housing to decrease peak recoil. The gun uses a direct impingement gas system, likely based on the Type 77 and Type 85 heavy machine guns. Type 89 was named "lightweight heavy machine gun" due to its lightweight gun and tripod.

China reportedly developed 12.7 mm armor piercing discarding sabot (APDS) ammunition for the QJZ-89, similar to the U.S. saboted light armor penetrator (SLAP) rounds, increasing performance against light armored vehicles.

== Users ==
- Cambodia
- China
- Mongolia: Mounted on Dongfeng EQ2050 during Mongolian State Flag Day parade in 2022.

=== Non-State Actors ===
- United Wa State Army

== See also ==
- Type 77 heavy machine gun
- W85 heavy machine gun
- QJZ-171
- M2 Browning
- XM312
- Kord machine gun
