= QJZ-171 =

QJZ-171 Type 171 Heavy Machine Gun
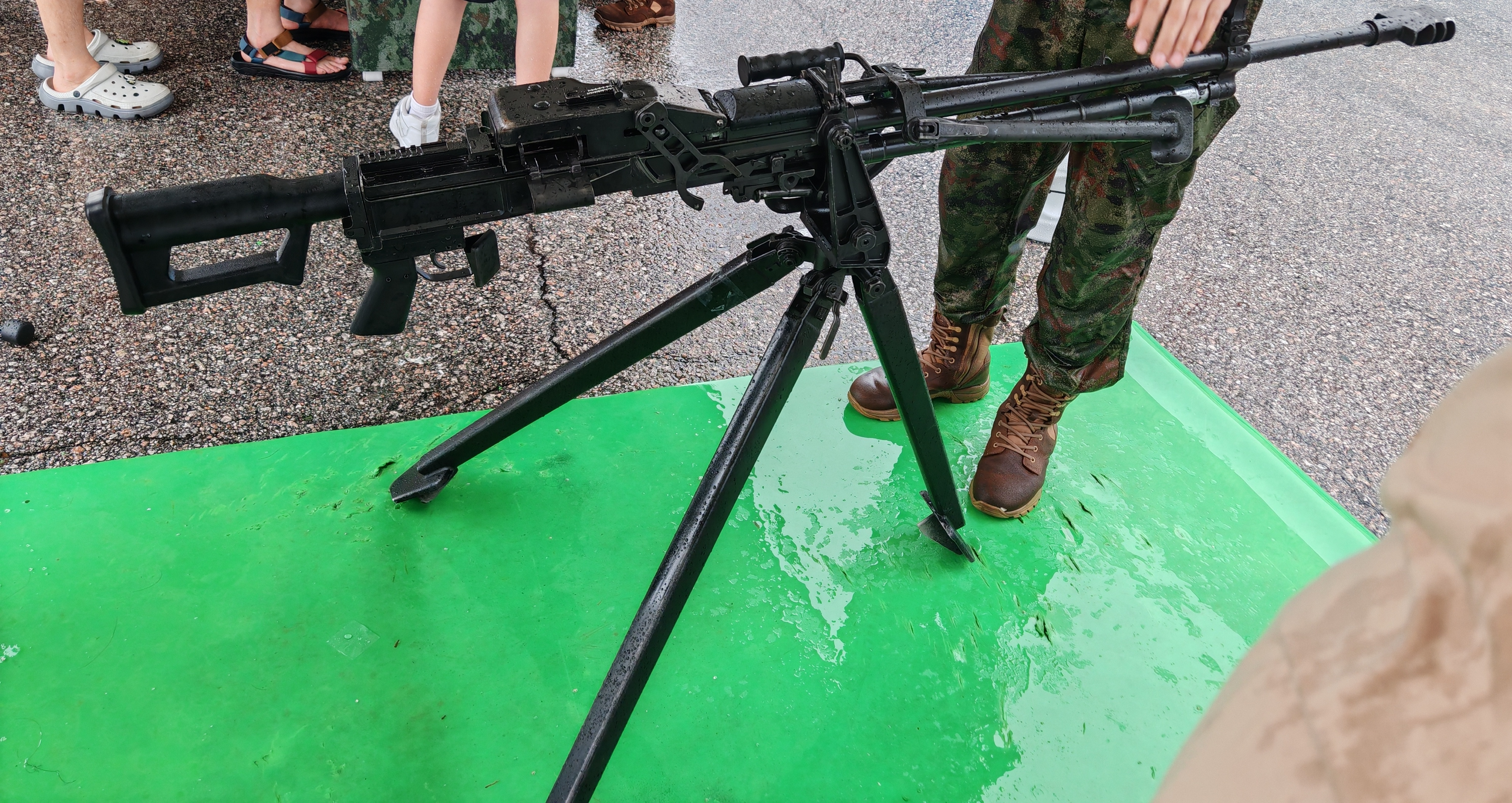
- QJZ-171 on a tripod mount
- Type: Heavy machine gun
- Place of origin: China

Service history
- Used by: China

Production history
- Manufacturer: Norinco

Specifications
- Mass: 16.9 kilograms (37 lb) (gun & bipod); 18.1 kg (39.90 lb) (w/ empty magazine); 5.9–6 kg (13.01–13.23 lb) (tripod)
- Barrel length: 787 mm (31.0 in)
- Cartridge: 12.7×108mm light-weight ammunition
- Action: hybrid short-recoil and advanced primer ignition blowback
- Effective firing range: 1,500 m (1,600 yd)
- Feed system: 60 rounds of belts in a container box
- Sights: QMK-171 (5x) daylight optics passive thermal imaging sight

The QJZ-171, also known as the Type 171 heavy machine gun, is a Chinese heavy machine gun designed and manufactured by Norinco for the People's Liberation Army. It fires a type of specialized 12.7×108mm light-weight ammunition. Intended for mountainous terrain and high-altitude infantry operations, the QJZ-171 is one of the lightest heavy machine guns, with a weight comparable to general-purpose machine guns (GPMG) of other countries. The QJZ-171 entered PLA service, replacing the previous generation QJZ-89 heavy machine gun.

== Description ==
The QJZ-171 is designed as an ultra-lightweight heavy machine gun, similar to the American XM312 and XM806. The Firearms Blog believes the gun weighs 11.9 kg (26.2 lb), which is comparable to M240 or FN MAG, and the tripod weighs 5.9 kg (13.0 lb). While other sources believes the gun weighs around 16.9 kg (37.3 lb) and 18.1 kg (39.9 lb) with an empty magazine box attached, while the tripod weighs around 6 kg (13.2 lb). It's known from the official source that the total weight of combat configuration, which includes ammunition cartridges, belts, boxes, and scopes, is 9.5 kg (20.9 lb) lighter than the same configuration on QJZ-89. This is achieved by ammo containers made of plastic composites, lighter tripod, and a lighter type of 12.7×108mm ammunition. The empty weight of the gun alone is similar to its predecessor, the QJZ-89.

The gun features a free-floating barrel, improved muzzle brake, composite ammo belt with new lightweight ammunition, and titanium alloy gun parts to reduce recoil and weight. The machine gun is fitted with its own bipod attached to the receiver and can be carried by one infantry or served by a crew of two.

The machine gun is operated via an open-bolt and advanced primer ignition blowback mechanism with a recoiling barrel. The hybrid short recoil system reduces peak recoil, achieved with the barrel, gas system, and bolt assembly recoiling inside the outer housing.

The weapon features several improvements to reduce weight, mitigate recoil and increase accuracy. The new 12.7mm armor-piercing incendiary round made of special alloy only weighs 100 grams. The gas system cycles the bolt group with the free-floating receiver recoils inside the outer gun housing to decrease recoil. Two sets of spring buffers are mounted around the receiver. The barrel is fitted with an improved multi-chamber muzzle compensator. Comparing to QJZ-89, the spread of QJZ-171 is improved to 10 cm (3.9 in) at 200 m (656.2 ft), and it can reliably hit targets with a radius of 24 cm (9.4 in) at 200 m (656.2 ft). At 1,000 m (3,280.8 ft), the gun can engage vehicle-sized targets with a 70% hit probability.

== Variants ==
QJZ-171
Chinese military designation.
CS/LM23
Export designation.

== Users ==
- China: People's Liberation Army

== See also ==
- QJZ-89
- QJY-201
- XM806
- LWMMG
- Sig MG 338
- Kord machine gun
