= Rheinmetall RMG.50 =

RMG.50
- Type: Heavy machine gun
- Place of origin: Germany

Production history
- Designed: 2008-09
- Manufacturer: Rheinmetall

Specifications
- Mass: 25.0 kg (55.1 lb)
- Length: 1,884 mm (74.2 in)
- Barrel length: 1,200 mm (47 in)
- Cartridge: 12.7x99 mm NATO
- Caliber: .50BMG
- Barrels: 1
- Action: gearbox-driven crank, externally powered
- Rate of fire: 600 rounds per minute
- Effective firing range: 1,800 m (5,900 ft)
- Feed system: dual linkless feed

The RMG.50 is a German heavy machine gun developed by Rheinmetall.

The RMG.50 machine gun is under development by the company under contract to the Bundeswehr as a replacement for the Browning M2HB recoil-operated heavy machine gun of the same calibre. According to a company representative, work on the RMG.50 started in 2008 and the first firings took place at the end of 2009. A second prototype was completed and started trials in August 2010. A third prototype were delivered in 2011 for internal qualification and pre-series weapons were delivered to the German Ministry of Defence test authority in 2012. The weapon entered service with the German Bundeswehr in 2014.

Due to its weight and need for external power source it is currently (as of 2023) only mounted on vehicles, such as the Puma.
