= W85 heavy machine gun =

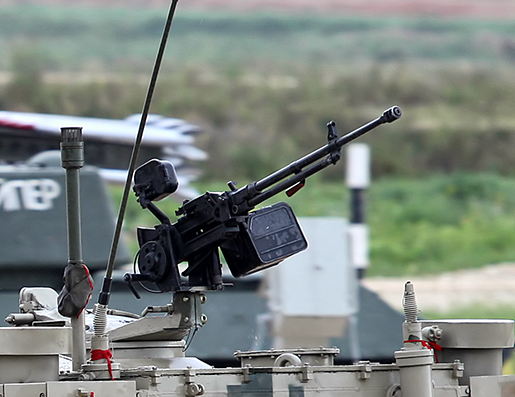
- W85 mounted on a Type 96B tank
- Type: Heavy machine gun
- Place of origin: China

Service history
- In service: 1980s-present
- Used by: See Users
- Wars: Sri Lankan Civil War; War in Darfur; Mali War; Syrian Civil War; Second Libyan Civil War; War in Iraq (2013–17); Yemeni Civil War; Tigray War; Russo-Ukrainian War; Fano insurgency Sudanese civil war (2023–present)

Production history
- Manufacturer: Norinco
- Produced: 1985-present
- Variants: QJC-88

Specifications
- Mass: 18.5 kg (40.79 lb) (gun only); 39 kg (85.98 lb) (with tripod)
- Cartridge: 12.7×108mm
- Action: Gas-operated, long stroke gas piston, open bolt
- Rate of fire: 550-600 rounds/min
- Muzzle velocity: 850 m/s (2,788 ft/s)
- Sights: Iron sights

The W85 heavy machine gun or QJC-88 vehicle mounted heavy machine gun is a gas-operated heavy machine gun designed in the People's Republic of China. It fires the Soviet-designed 12.7×108mm round. The W85 was never accepted into the PLA service in its original configuration, only adopted as a vehicle mounted machine gun as the QJC-88.

== Design ==
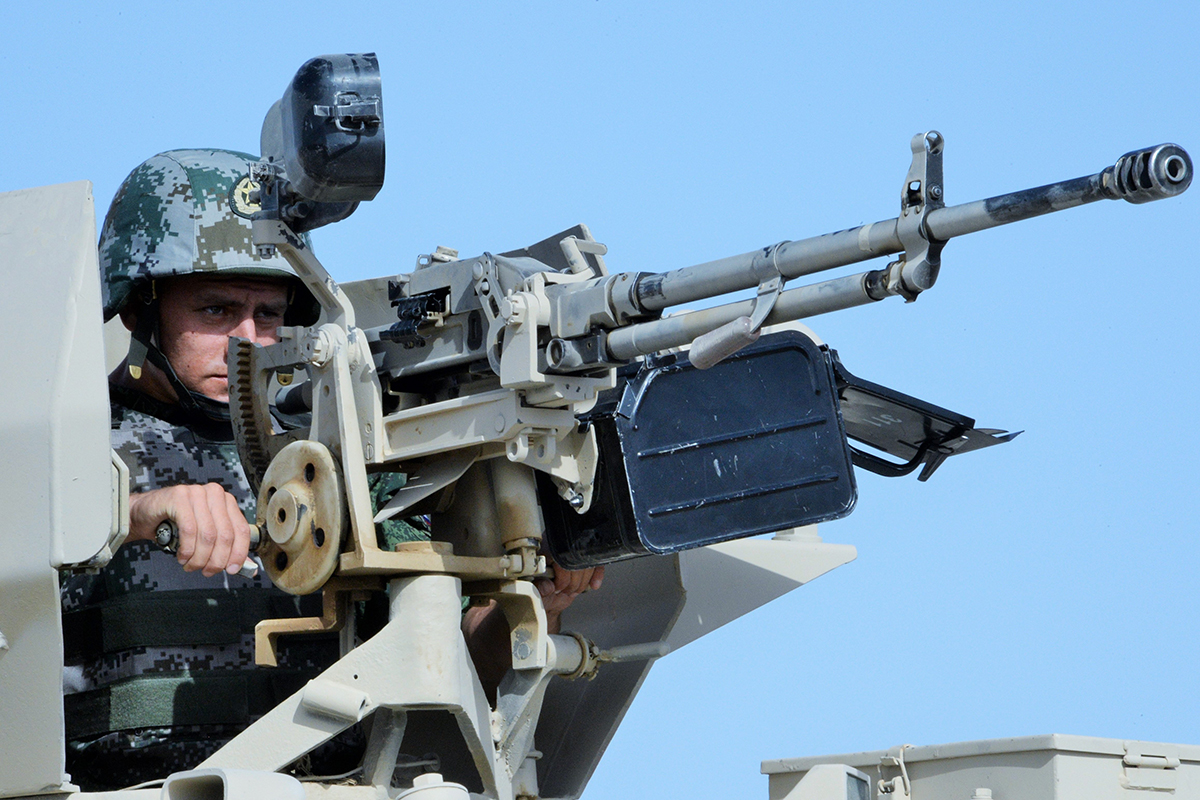
Pintle-mounted QJC-88

The W85 was designed to be as light as possible for infantry use. Its small receiver is of generally rectangular cross-section, and it has a thick gas tube below the barrel containing a conventional gas piston. In addition to iron sights, it has rails for optics or anti-aircraft sights. It fires 12.7×108mm rounds from belts and is more accurate than the Type 54 heavy machine gun, but the thinner barrel overheats faster.

In trials, the W85 lost out to the Type 85 as an infantry weapon and was not accepted into PLA service for this role.

=== QJC-88 ===
The QJC-88 was introduced as a pintle mounted machine gun for tanks and armored vehicles. It weighs the same as the W85, is solenoid fired, and is mounted on a special cradle allowing for elevation angles of -5 to +65°.

Mounted platforms:

- Type 99 tank: as commander heavy machine gun.
- Type 96 tank: as commander heavy machine gun.
- Type 15 tank: as commander heavy machine gun on a remote weapon station.
- Type 59 Durjoy tank: as commander heavy machine gun.
- Type 05: on armored personnel carrier variant.
- Type 08: on various comigrations, such as ZSL-10 APC, ZTL-11 assault vehicle, and Type 08 Artillery Reconnaissance Vehicle.
- PLL-05: as commander heavy machine gun.
- Type 89 AFV: on various comigrations as the self-defense weapon.

== Combat Use ==
During the Syrian civil war, some Syrian Democratic Forces technicals locally known as duşkas were equipped with W85 heavy machine guns.

== Users ==
- Afghanistan
- Cambodia
- China
- Iraq
- Libya− Libyan National Army
- Mali
- Nepal - Used by Nepali Army
- Rwanda − Used by Rwandan peacekeepers in Darfur.
- South Sudan − South Sudan Democratic Movement
- Sri Lanka
- Sudan − Manufactured locally as Khawad.
- Ukraine − Seen with Ukrainian forces from 2022. Theorized to be taken from intercepted arms shipments to the Houthis in 2021.

=== Non-state actors ===
- Free Syrian Army
- Islamic State
- People's Defense Units
- Wagner Group − Khawad used by mercenaries in Mali
